= LGBTQ history in India =

LGBTQ people are well documented in various artworks and literary works of ancient India, with evidence suggesting that homosexuality and transsexuality were accepted by the major Dharmic religions. Hinduism and the various other Indian religions were not homophobic and evidence implies that homosexuality thrived in ancient India until the medieval period. Hinduism describes a third gender that is equal to other genders and documentation of the third gender are found in ancient Hindu and Buddhist medical texts. The term "third gender" is sometimes viewed as a specifically South Asian term, and this third gender is also found throughout South Asia and East Asia.

It's likely that parts of north western fringes of Indian empires were influenced by homophobia early on through Zoroastrianism (250 BCE) and Islam, both of which explicitly forbade homosexual sex, and that this influenced socio-cultural norms in that region. LGBTQ people in the Islamic communities were persecuted more severely, especially under the rule of the Mughals, which ruled over large parts of India, though Mughal leaders largely tolerated the cultures of the various non-Muslim communities of India.

From the early modern period, colonialism from Europe also brought with it more centralized legal codes that imposed Christian-European morals that were homophobic in nature, including criminalizing sex between two people of the same gender, and criminalizing transsexuality.

In the 21st century following independence, there has been a significant amount of progress made on liberalizing LGBTQ laws.

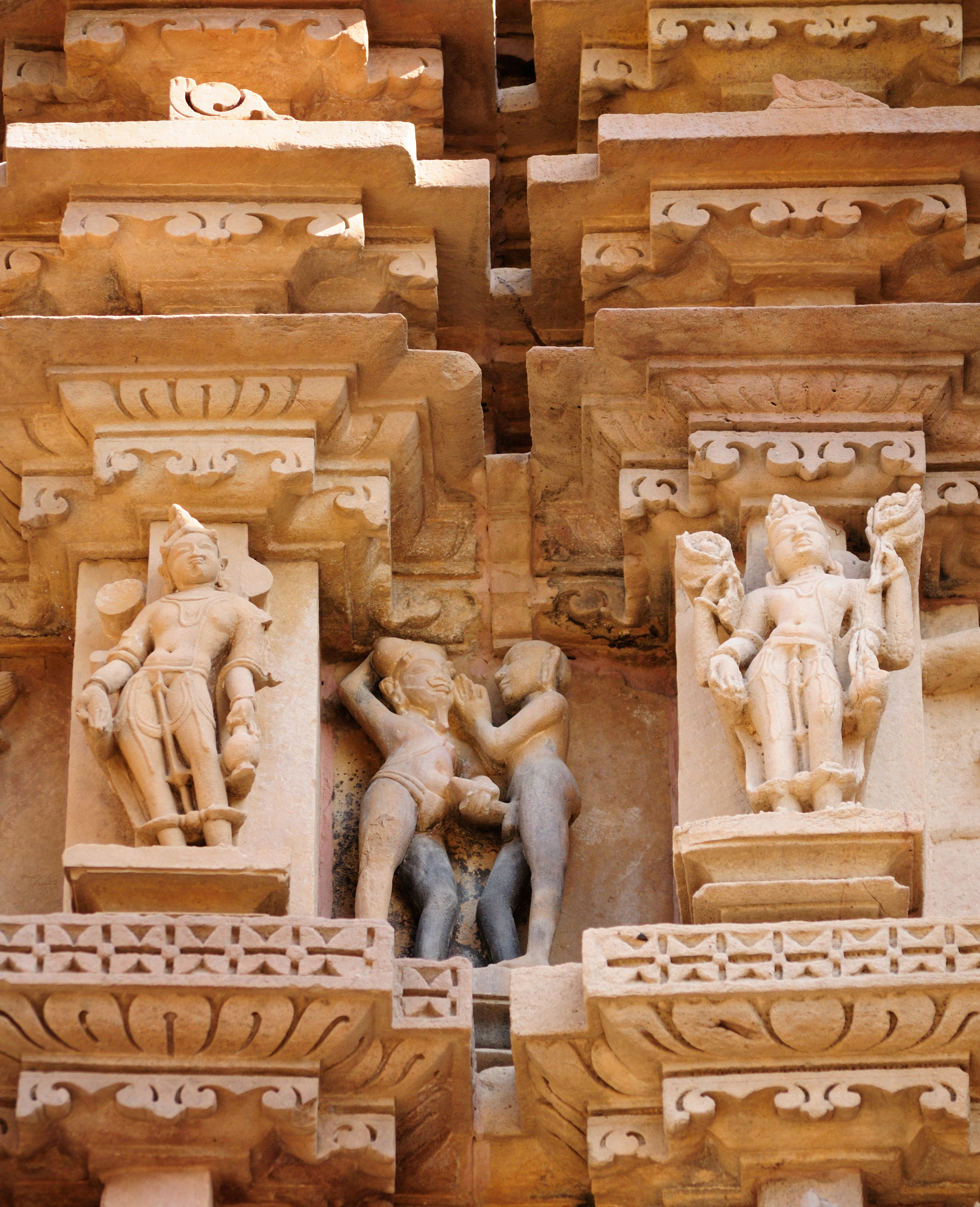
Erotic sculptures of two men (center) at the Khajuraho temples

== Ancient period ==
Hinduism provides a wide breadth of literary and artistic sources showing LGBTQ life in ancient India. Hinduism does not have explicit morals condemning homosexuality nor transsexuality, and has taken various positions on the topic, ranging from containing positive descriptions of homosexual characters, acts and themes in its texts to being neutral or antagonistic towards it. The concept of sexual minorities was widely known in the prevailing Hindu culture by the time Gautama Buddha founded his philosophies, and homosexuality was also thought to be viewed positively in Buddhism

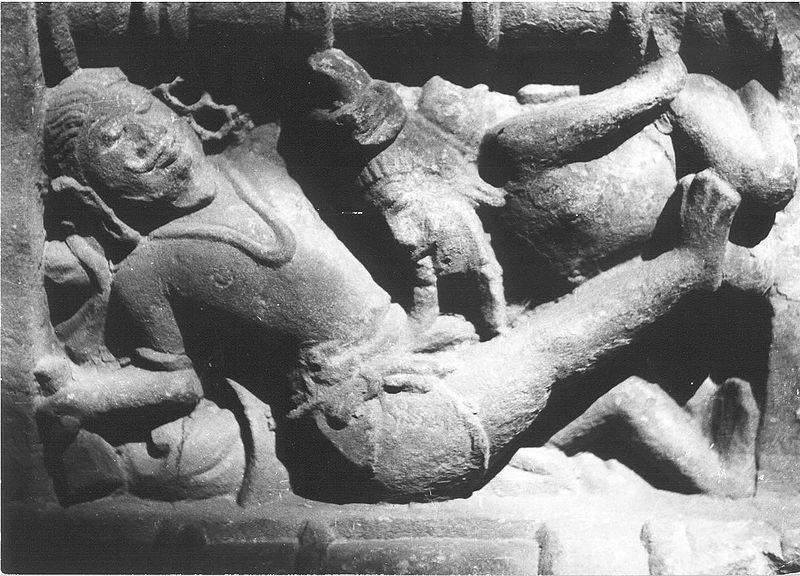
At the Lakshmana temple in Khajuraho (954 CE), a man receives fellatio from a seated male as part of an orgiastic scene.

The Kama Sutra is an ancient text dealing with kama or desire (of all kinds), which in Hindu thought is one of the four normative and spiritual goals of life. The Kama Sutra is the earliest extant and most important work in the Kama Shastra tradition of Sanskrit literature. It was compiled by the philosopher Vātsyāyana around the 4th century, from earlier texts, and describes homosexual practices in several places, as well as a range of sex/gender 'types'. The author writes that these relations also involve love and a bond of trust.

The author describes techniques by which masculine and feminine types of the third sex (tritiya-prakriti), as well as women, perform fellatio. The Second Part, Ninth Chapter of Kama Sutra specifically describes two kinds of men that we would recognize today as masculine- and feminine-type homosexuals but which are mentioned in older, Victorian British translations as simply "eunuchs." The chapter describes their appearances – feminine types dressed up as women whereas masculine types maintained muscular physiques and grew small beards, mustaches, etc. – and their various professions as masseurs, barbers and prostitutes are all described. Such homosexual men were also known to marry, according to the Kama Sutra: "There are also third-sex citizens, sometimes greatly attached to one another and with complete faith in one another, who get married together." (KS 2.9.36). In the "Jayamangala" of Yashodhara, an important twelfth-century commentary on the Kama Sutra, it is also stated: "Citizens with this kind of homosexual inclination, who renounce women and can do without them willingly because they love one another, get married together, bound by a deep and trusting friendship."

The Arthashastra, a 2nd century BCE Indian treatise on statecraft, mentions a wide variety of sexual practices which, whether performed with a man or a woman, were sought to be punished with the lowest grade of fine. While homosexual intercourse was sanctioned, it was treated as a very minor offence, and several kinds of heterosexual intercourse were punished more severely.

Sex between non-virgin women incurred a small fine, while homosexual intercourse between men could be made up for merely with a bath with one's clothes on, and a penance of "eating the five products of the cow and keeping a one-night fast" – the penance being a replacement of the traditional concept of homosexual intercourse resulting in a loss of caste. These are punishments listed for the use of the priestly class of people (traditionally monks) for both heterosexual and homosexual sexual misconduct, where the punishments for heterosexual misconduct were often more severe than homosexual misconduct.

== Medieval period ==
A large number of erotic artwork depicting homosexuality can be found on numerous temples throughout India, including the Khajuraho Group of Monuments built in the 700s and the Konark Sun Temple built in the 13th century.

== Early modern period ==
References to homoeroticism are found throughout Indo-Islamic culture. Mughal artwork and poetry contains many examples of celebrations of male homoeroticism. The first Mughal Emperor Babur wrote about his passion and desire for a male "lover" called Baburi (who was already an adult when the Emperor ascended the throne) in his autobiography Baburnama. He wrote :

"Occasionally Baburi came to me, but I was so bashful that I could not look him in the face, much less converse freely with him. In my excitement and agitation I could not thank him for coming, much less complain of his leaving. Who could bear to demand the ceremonies of fealty?"

=== 1500s ===
In 1528, J.M. John Marshal, doctoral research scholar based in the Department of History, Goa University, Taleigao, recorded in his book Homosexuality in Early Modern Goa the judiciary of Goa punished a muslim man for sodomy.

In 1560, homosexuality was prohibited for much of the existence of the Portuguese Empire. The Portuguese introduced Goa Inquisition to deal with problems of sodomy and prosecuted homosexuals or people engaged in same sexual activity.

=== 1600s ===
In 1607, Marshal, in his research, noted the case of Alberto Homemo, a German soldier in the Portuguese army, who was executed without trial. "The inquisition record states that Alberto, induced by devil, committed the ‘horrible and abominable vice of sodomy’ since he was 16 years old, habitually with many men, also while he was serving in the North (Portuguese Bombay) as well as many cities where he lived and when he was sent in the army of Malacca too. The inquisition declared him being infamous, confiscated his goods, and ‘relaxed’ him to secular justice to be burnt alive. The sentence was written by the Inquisitor Jorge Ferreira, dated 09-12-1607."

In 1667 or 1675, the Fatawa-e-Alamgiri of the Mughal Empire mandated a common set of punishments for homosexuality, which could include 50 lashes for a slave, 100 for a free infidel, or death by stoning for a Muslim. While pederasty was often considered as "pure love" and prevalent among those from Central Asia, in India, however, this was generally unheard of. For example, the governor of Burhanpur was murdered by a boy servant with whom he tried to be intimate. Muslim Urdu poetry of the era sometimes expressed homoerotic viewpoints reminiscent of bromances, but these were not explicitly homosexual in nature.

=== 1700s ===
In 1723, the scholarly research of Mir Taqi Mir's poems and ghazals showed allusions and references to beloved male lovers. Ruth Vanita, Saleem Kidwai, p 119, Same-sex love in India: readings from literature and history also asserts that Mir's poetry "represents homoeroticism" and that he, along with others, "developed a discourse of erotic commentary on young males."

In 1791, homosexuality was decriminalised in the French Indian territories of Pondicherry.

=== 1800s ===
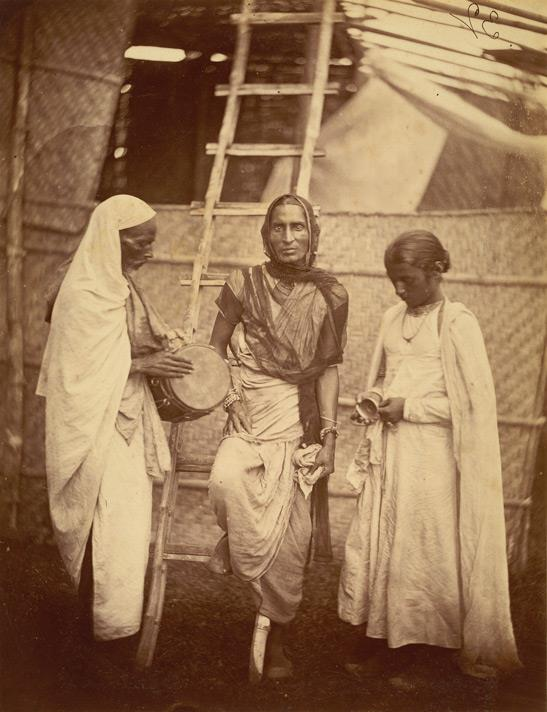
Hijra and companions in Eastern Bengal in 1860

In 1861, the British Raj, in directly governed British territories, replaced the criminal offences and punishments set out in the Mughal Fatawa 'Alamgiri, with those of the 1862 Indian Penal Code, section Section 377 covering homosexuality. The law stated: "Whoever voluntarily has carnal intercourse against the order of nature with any man, woman or animal, shall be punished with [imprisonment for life], or with imprisonment of either description for a term which may extend to ten years, and shall also be liable to fine. Explanation: Penetration is sufficient to constitute the carnal intercourse necessary to the offense described in the section." The law was drafted by Thomas Babington Macaulay, who based it on anti-sodomy laws that already existed in Britain." The term "order of the nature" was never defined, hence considering its vagueness, the law could apply to virtually any sexual act considered against this order by the British Judiciary, which included all penetrative sexual acts, except for vaginal penetration by a man. There are not many cases that were tried under this law, though, as there were only exist 5 recorded cases that were tried under Section 377 India till 1920. The law had a larger impact on social values than legal ones. The anti-sodomy law in Britain and, in turn, India, was inspired by the 'purity campaign', an ideology that aimed at repressing sexual conduct in British society. This campaign also changed the perception and beliefs about sexualities in the European society.

In 1871, the hijra were labelled a "criminal tribe" in the Criminal Tribes Act (1871). Eventually, they were subjected to compulsory registration, unlawful monitoring, and stigmatization. British Lieutenant-Governor Edmund Drummond (1814–1895) framed the anti-hijra campaign as a necessary project of "extinguishment" and "extinction" in an attempt to simplify identity to fit a category rather than consider it in the context of its' existence. The surveillance methods were enacted over communities with hopes to eradicate hijras permanently.

In 1884, the sodomy-related case to be prosecuted under British rule in India was the case of Khairati vs Queen Empress. Khairati was first called on by the police when he was seen dressed as a woman and singing with a group of women in Moradabad. The case was brought to the Allahabad high court, where Khairati was forced to undergo a medical examination and was found to have an 'extended anal orifice' which was a sign of a 'habitual catamite'. Cross-dressing was, again, used as evidence to support this argument. Cross-dressing was normal in the indigenous culture in India, but since this did not fit the moral standards of sexuality of Brits and due to the ambiguity of Section 377, Khairati was arrested and prosecuted in court. Khairati was later acquitted on appeal in the Allahabad high court.

== 20th Century ==
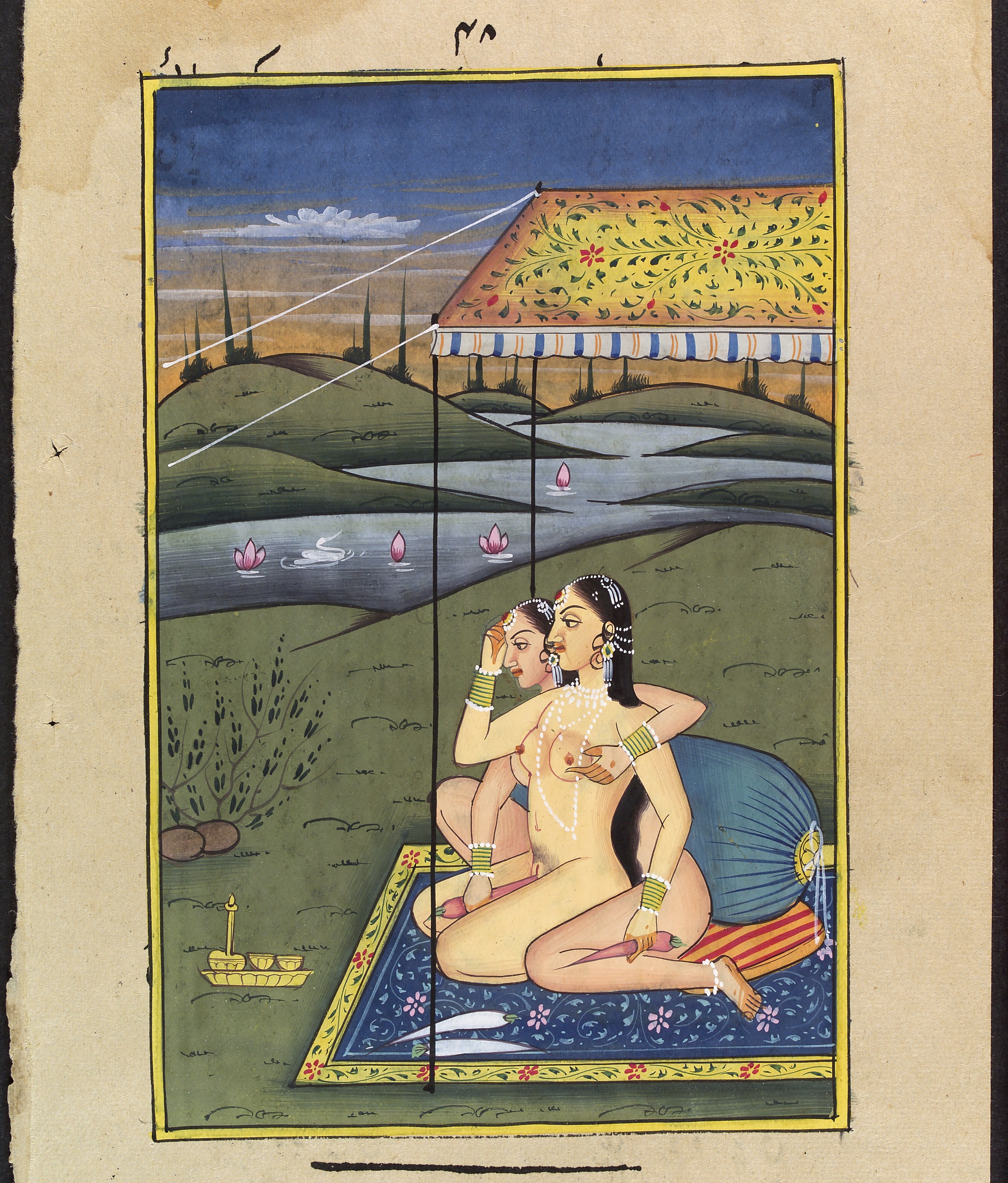
Two women using carrots as dildos, 20th century gouache painting.

=== 1920s ===
On 31 May 1924, Matvala, a Calcutta biweekly, published a story titled "Chocolate" by Pandey Bechan Sharma "Ugra".

In the opening passages, a lovesick Dinkar Prasad is likened to Majnun by the narrator as he flops into a chair reciting a sher to articulate, yet encode, his grief. Manohar Chandra, another friend, attempts decoding with chher chhaar, teasing him in Banarasi Hindi. When Dinkar commends his verse, Manohar exclaims: "Has your fine lady, Urdu, been defeated[…]?" Later, an adolescent boy, Ramesh, appears at the door, and Dinkar darts off. Manohar duly informs the narrator that Ramesh is Dinkar's chocolate – the object of his romantic-erotic affections – before launching on a tirade to deride his same-sex desire: "He'll sift through history, finish off the Puranas, and prove to you that love of boys is not unnatural but natural." In this brief overture, Ugra condensed competing linguistic, ethnic, and cultural assessors of homosexuality.

In December 1924, after the publication of Chocolate Charcha Ugra was charged with sedition for editing the victory issue of Swadesh and sentenced to nine months in prison under section 124A of the IPC.

In 1927, Ugra wrote Hey Sukumar (O Beautiful Young Man!), Vyabhichari Pyar (Dissolute Love), and Jail Mein (In Prison) and published them in the short fiction Chocolate: And Other Writings On Male Homoeroticism in Calcutta.

=== 1930s ===
In 1936, Raghupati Sahay, also known by his pen name Firaq Gorakhpuri, a professor of English at Allahabad University, published an article in defence of homosexual love. Talking about Ghazals he describes the depiction of homosexuality in poetry across time and cultures in the works of Sappho, Socrates, Saadi, Hafiz, Shakespeare, and Whitman.

=== 1970s ===
In 1971, Badnam Basti, India's first film featuring homosexual themes film depicting the story of two men and women in a love triangle hit the theatre. It is adapted from an eponymous novel by Hindi novelist Kamleshwar (writer). The film was thought to have been lost for 40 years, but a print was found in 2019.

In 1974, The First gay group in called Laundebaz-E-Hind was formed in Bombay.

In 1977, Shakuntala Devi published the first study of homosexuality in India. She wrote, "rather than pretending that homosexuals don't exist" it was time "we face the facts squarely in the eye and find room for [homosexual people]."

In 1978, an unknown gay group had published the first gay newsletter of India called Gay Scene from Calcutta. Some of its archived copies were discovered much later through Shakti Khabar in early 1990s.

In 1979, Hijras met in Ahemdabad for the 50th Anniversary of Hijra named Dada Guru Shankar.

=== 1980s ===
In 1980, two lesbian women, Mallika and Lalidambika, died by suicide in Kerala.

In 1981, Indian Playwright Vijay Tendulkar wrote Marathi play Mitrachi Goshta, a three-act play with a theme of same-sex attraction. In the same year, All-India Hijra Conference brought together 50,000 Hijras who travelled to Agra.

Bhupen Khakhar experienced the gay-rights movement in 1979 when he visited England and it was then he felt acceptance and comfort with his own sexuality. In 1981, he painted ‘You Can't Please All’ which is widely regarded as a symbol of his coming out.

In 1982, Bhupen Khakhar's Two Men In Benaras (1982), an oil on canvas painting, depicted an intimate scene of love situated in the pilgrimage capital of India. The shades near the soles and toes were smudged with moon-like dust and depicted the desire and lust the two subjects had for each other.

In 1986, journalist Ashok Row Kavi penned an article about himself for Savvy Magazine, which became the first ‘coming out’ story from India.

In 1987, Khakra's painting Yayati (1987) explored and created a dialogue between intimacy, religion, and mythology. ‘Yayati’ was the first king of Pauravas. The same year, Rohit Khosla co-founded Ensemble, India's popular designer label store in New Delhi, with Tarun and Sal Tahiliani.

Also in 1987, two policewomen from Madhya Pradesh married each other. Eventually, on 24 February 1988, pictures from their marriage made front page news under the headline "Lesbian Cops". Leela and Urmila were chastised by the police force, discharged of their duties for inappropriate behaviour, and inundated with media attention.

In 1989, Dominic D'Souza was forcibly quarantined and isolated in a tuberculosis ward for 64 days because of stigma and hatred towards people with HIV.

During 1987–1989, Lesbians from Delhi Group met for informal gatherings, or "Single women's nights," in members' homes to discuss compulsive heterosexuality and to bond over their identifications as "Women who love women."

=== 1990s ===
In 1990, Naz Foundation International started in London to spread awareness regarding AIDs/HIV epidemic. The same year, Ashok Row Kavi, a few short years after coming out, founded India's first magazine for queer men, Bombay Dost.

In 1991, 7 members of ABVA published "Less Than Gay: A Citizens' Report on the Status of Homosexuality in India", which was the first report to publicly recognize the status of queer people in India and addressed the discrimination they faced. The report demanded the rights of the queer community in India, as it imposed a need to repeal Section 377 and the Army, Navy, and Air Force Act of 1950. This report was followed by a public protest, organized by the ABVA in New Delhi, which is recognized as the first public demonstration against anti-sodomy laws in India. This demonstration protested Section 377 and its use by the police to harass the gay community. The protest was particularly sparked by an act of police brutality in Connaught Place, where 18 people were arrested on the charges that they were allegedly going to engage in homosexual acts. This protest was joined by over 500 people, which included multiple democratic and civil rights groups.

In 1992, The AIDS Bhedbhav Virodhi Andolan (ABVA), or the AIDS Anti-discrimination movement, organized the first public protest against anti-sodomy laws in India in August 1992. The ABVA was an activist group, with its original intent being spreading awareness regarding AIDS in India, as they opposed the intolerant practices and discrimination of the Indian government against HIV positive patients. They protested against the government policy that required the doctors to disclose the names of HIV-positive patients, who were then put in isolation. The group organized multiple protests demanding rights for HIV-affected people and sex workers.

In 1994, ABVA filled the first Public Interest Litigation (PIL) challenging Section 377 and its validity. This PIL was filed in response to the denial by authorities to a request by ABVA demanding the distribution of condoms in Tihar Jail. The reason for this as stated by Kiran Bedi, the then Inspector General of Prisons in India, was that the distribution of condoms would acknowledge and accept the existence of homosexual practices in the jail. The petition was dismissed in 2001 in the Delhi High Court.

On 10 November 1994, Vimala Farooqui, had appealed to the Prime Minister to cancel permission for an international conference of Gay Men to be held in Bombay.

In 1996, Riyad Vinci Wadia produced an Independent short film, Bomgay. Riyad was then in the process of generating funds for his supposed first full-length movie, Naked Rain(Unfinished), based on R. Raj Rao's novel, Boyfriend. "He made a very important contribution to the gay cause and was one of the central figures to begin the broad-basing of the gay movement in India," said gay activist Ashok Row Kavi.

In 1997, Lawyer and activist Arvind Narrain student at the National Law School of Banglore, headed a seminar on LGBTQ rights discussing queerness in new and public settings.

In 1998, Deepa Mehta lesbian theme movie Fire was released on 5 November 1998 in India. The film is loosely based on Ismat Chughtai's 1942 story, "Lihaaf" ("The Quilt"). The members of right-wing groups like the Shiv Sena and Bajrang Dal attacked cinema halls across the country.

In 1999, Sonali Gulati made a short film titled "Sum Total", a lesbian matrimonial that addresses issues of identity, self-representation, and hetronormativity.

The Friendship Walk is the first and oldest pride march in India and South Asia. This was first organized on 2 July 1999 in the city of Kolkata. During this time period, gay rights activists in India had started demanding that political leaders include gay rights as a part of their election campaigns, but these demands were ignored. So, in order to make a political statement, Owais Khan first proposed the idea of the friendship walk. This idea was circulated among the public and received mixed reactions until the walk was finally organized. The pride march was joined by 15 people from all across the country, who wore custom-designed, bright yellow T-shirts with a graphic of footsteps and a motto that read 'Walk on the rainbow'. The participants of the march further divided themselves into two groups, one of which continued the walk towards North Kolkata and the other one towards South Kolkata. They proceeded to meet multiple Human rights organizations, NGOs, and AIDS prevention groups to voice their agenda and spread their message. The walk ended with both groups meeting at the George Bhavan where all the participants were interviewed by the media, as they shared their views on the issue of rejection of Homosexuality and sexual/gender non-conformity in India. The news spread across South Asia and the pride march was met with strong support not only in India but from people in Pakistan and Bangladesh as well. This walk became the inspiration for various pride marches that were organized all across the country in the subsequent years and influenced the sociopolitical scenario in many countries across South Asia.

Also in 1999, CALERI (Campaign for Lesbian Rights) came out with a manifesto titled "Lesbian Emergence". In the same year, Soul Kitchen disco in Delhi hosted the first "gay night."

== 21st Century ==
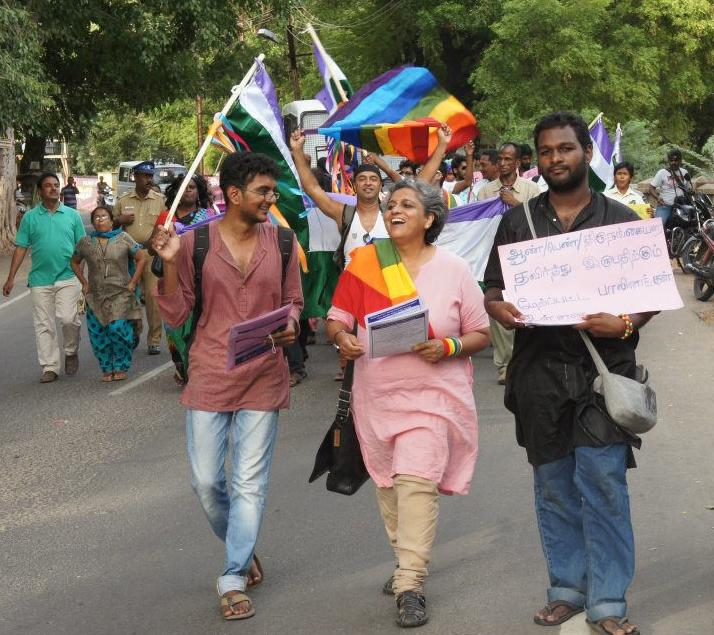
Asia's first Genderqueer Pride Parade at Madurai with Anjali Gopalan (July 2012)

=== 2000s ===
In 2001, Naz Foundation (India) Trust, a non-governmental organization, filed a lawsuit in the Delhi High Court in 2001, seeking the legalisation of homosexual intercourse between consenting adults.

In 2002, Naz Foundation filed a Public Interest Litigation (PIL) to challenge IPC Section 377 in the Delhi High Court.

In 2003, Delhi High Court refused to consider a petition regarding the legality of the law and said the petitioners had no locus standi in the matter.

Also in 2003, R. Raj Rao's first novel The Boyfriend (novel) was published highlighting the gay subculture of 1992–93 after the Bombay riots.

In 2004, The Journey (2004 film), Malayalam language feature film written, directed and produced by Ligy J. Pullappally, was released. It is said to be inspired by her short film Uli and the true story of two lesbian lovers in the South Indian state of Kerala.

On 11 June 2004, Girlfriend (2004 film) depicted Tanya's (Isha Koppikar) obsessive relationship with Sapna (Amrita Arora). The relationship dilemma sparked after Sapna starts dating Rahul (Aashish Chaudhary).

In 2005, film My Brother…Nikhil directed by Onir portrayed the life of the protagonist, Nikhil, from 1987 to 1994, when AIDS awareness in India was considerably low.

Also in 2005, Prince Manvendra Singh Gohil publicly came out as gay. He was disinherited as an immediate reaction by the royal family and was a question of stigma throughout the nation.

In January 2006, Human Rights Watch published a report that article 377 was used to harass HIV/AIDS prevention activists, as well as sex workers, men who have sex with men, and other LGBTQ groups.

In 2006, a 24-year-old gay man Hiren Makwana, a community organiser in an NGO, Counterpart International India (CII), at Bodakdev, was murdered over intimate relationships and financial disputes. The police found the homicide videotaped on the Handycam.

In May 2006, Mohammed Wasim, reportedly killed his two partners Akhtar Afindi (52) and Jamshed Alam (32) for money.

In September 2006, Amartya Sen, acclaimed writer Vikram Seth and other prominent Indians publicly demanded the repeal of section 377 of the IPC. In the open letter they demanded that "In the name of humanity and of our Constitution, this cruel and discriminatory law should be struck down."

In 2007, Prince Manvendra Singh Gohil appeared on the American talk show The Oprah Winfrey Show on 24 October 2007, and on BBC Three's Undercover Princes.

Also in 2007, Rao founded the Queer Studies Circle at Pune University. Rao was one of the first to offer a course on LGBTQ literature at the university level in India in 2007, after years of resistance on the part of his academic superiors. He said: "It's strange how the academic fraternity that has always been quick to accept all kinds of literature — Marxist, feminist, Dalit — had a huge reservation when it came to queer literature. For years, the Board of Studies refused to let us start the course saying that 'Indian students do not need it'. Finally, we clubbed it with Dalit literature and started it under the genre of Alternative Literature."

In 2008, the five Indian cities Delhi, Bangalore, Kolkata, Indore and Pondicherry celebrated gay pride parades with 2000 people from nationwide.

Also in 2008, Zoltan Parag, a competitor at the Mr. Gay International contest, said that he was apprehensive about returning to India stating "Indian media has exposed me so much that now when I call my friends back home, their parents do not let them talk to me". Zoltan did not return to India and reportedly sought asylum in the United States.

In 2009, Delhi High Court decision Naz Foundation v. Govt. of NCT of Delhi, found Section 377 and other legal prohibitions against same-sex conduct to be in direct violation of fundamental rights provided by the Indian Constitution. The decisions of a High Court on the constitutionality of law (i.e. judicial review) apply throughout India, and not just to the territory of the state over which the High Court in question has jurisdiction. However, even after the pronouncement of the verdict, there have been (rare) incidents of harassment of homosexual groups.

The same year, Pink Pages the first online magazine to publish an article after the historic judgement of decriminalising of homosexuality.

Also in 2009, Celina Jaitley re-launched the Bombay Dost, the gay magazine, in Mumbai. Same year, R. Raj Rao published Whistling in the Dark: Twenty-One Queer Interviews, co-editor with Dibyajyoti Sarma.

=== 2010s ===
In 2010, Rao published his gay-themed novel Hostel Room 131 (2010).

In February 2010, Professor Ramchandra Siras was outed and suspended from his job at AMU for "immoral sexual activity". Even though homosexuality was legalised in 2010 two men forced their way into Siras' house and videotape him having consensual sex with another man.

In April 2010, Siras died in his apartment in Aligarh. The preliminary results from the autopsy showed traces of poison in his body.

In April 2010, Onir film I Am (2010 Indian film) exploring issues on themes such as single motherhood, displacement, child abuse and same-sex relationships won a national film award.

In March 2011, Pulitzer Prize-winning author Joseph Lelyveld published Great Soul: Mahatma Gandhi and His Struggle with India citing Mahatma Gandhi exchanged an intimate letter with a German Jewish architect Hermann Kallenbach. The book received favourable criticism and was banned in India. However, Tushar Gandhi, Gandhi's great-grandson, has defended the book.

In 2011, the Delhi high court on Monday upheld the life sentence of the two men for murdering United Nations Development Programme employee Pushkin Chandra and his gay partner Kuldeep in south Delhi seven years ago. "It is evident from the record that Pushkin Chandra used to indulge in unnatural sexual activities," the trial court judge had said in his judgment on March 3, 2010.

Also in 2011, 24-year-old Mahesh Soni, who had appeared on a reality show on television and admitted that he was homosexual and liked to wear a saree, committed suicide hanging from the ceiling fan at his Malwani residence.

On 16 February 2012, the Supreme Court, during a hearing of a bunch of appeals filed against decriminalisation of gay sex, observed that homosexuality should be seen in the context of changing society as many things which were earlier unacceptable have become acceptable with the passage of time. The two-judge bench, composed of Justices G S Singhvi and S J Mukhopadhaya, opined that homosexuality should be seen in the light of changing times where phenomena of live-in relationships, single parents and artificial fertilisation have become normal. They also pointed out that many things, which were considered immoral 20 years ago, have become acceptable to society now. The bench said that homosexual sex was not an offence prior to 1860 and referred to paintings and sculptures of Khajuraho. Senior Advocate Amrendra Sharan, who opposed the Delhi High Court order of decriminalising gay sex on behalf of the Delhi Commission for Protection of Child Rights, had then submitted that social issues cannot be decided on the basis of sculptures. The apex court bench, however, observed that it is a reflection of the society of that time and that homosexuality should not be seen only in terms of sexual intercourse. Earlier, the Supreme Court bench had asked the anti-gay rights groups, challenging the legalisation of homosexual sex to explain how such acts are against the order of nature as submitted by them. The apex court heard petitions filed by anti-gay rights activists and also by political, social and religious organisations which have opposed the Delhi High Court verdict decriminalising homosexual behaviour.

On 23 February 2012, the Union Home Ministry of the UPA government replying to a Supreme Court observation, told the Supreme Court that it was opposed to the decriminalisation of gay sex. "This is highly immoral and against the social order," the Home Ministry told the apex court. It said that India's moral and social values were different from other countries, and therefore, the nation should not be guided by them. The Central Government reversed its stance on 28 February 2012, asserting that there was no error in decriminalising gay sex. This resulted in the SC pulling up the Centre for frequently changing its stance on the issue. "Don't make a mockery of the system and don't waste the court's time", an apex court judge told the government.

In March 2012, "The population of Men who have Sex with Men was estimated to be 25 lakhs in India," the government said in its affidavit filed in the Supreme Court, citing figures of the National Aids Control Programme.

In June 2012, a guide titled 'Creating Inclusive Workplaces for LGBT Employees in India' was developed by IBM, Goldman Sachs, and Google together with Community Business, a non-profit organization.

In the same year, 2 July was celebrated as the first Indian Coming Out Day to mark the 2009 Naz Foundation v. Govt. of NCT of Delhi judgement that decriminalised homosexual sexual activity.

In 2013, Nolan Lewis, a model, participated at the Mr Gay World 2013 contest after trouble finding sponsors.

In December 2013, India's top court upheld the law that criminalises gay sex, in a ruling that reverses a landmark 2009 Delhi High Court order which had decriminalised homosexual acts. The court said it was up to Parliament to legislate on the issue. Indians have traditionally interpreted Section 377, a 153-year-old colonial-era law, as condemning a same-sex relationship as an "unnatural offence", and also considering it punishable by a 10-year jail term. Political, social and religious groups petitioned the Supreme Court to have the law reinstated in the wake of the 2009 court ruling.

In the same month, Indian novelist Vikram Seth appeared on the Indiatodayofficial cover picture protesting recriminalisation of section 377:

You shall not love or make love with the person you love, not because of excessive youth or because of unwillingness, but because he or she comes from a different religion, a different caste, the same village, the same gender. You may say you love each other, that you are happy with each other, that you give each other solace and courage and delight, but your love disgusts me. It runs counter to custom, it is an offence in law, it is against the order of nature, it brings dishonour to our family, it will dilute our blood, it will bring about kali-yuga, it will corrupt everyone around you, it is an abomination in the sight of the Lord. It must be forbidden. You may say you love each other, but I do not care. No, I cannot turn away and simply let you live your life in peace and happiness. I must do something about it. I will indeed do something about it. No, you have not harmed me, but I will harm you. I will disown you, I will treat you with contempt, I will make you an outcaste or a criminal, I will lock you up. I will break your legs, I will fling acid in your face, I will hang you from a crane, I will stone you to death. If the mob helps me, so much the better. If the law helps me, so much the better. If I can wrap myself in a flag, so much the better. If I can drape religion around myself, so much the better. But by one means or another, I will tear the two of you apart. It is fit and proper that I should do this. I will do this because my Clan tells me to, my Panchayat tells me to, this Book tells me to, this Section of this Act tells me to, Civilisation itself tells me to, God himself tells me to. No appeal to reason will touch me. No appeal to humanity will touch me. No appeal to Indian history or modern science will touch me. My brain is a science-free zone. My brain is a history-free zone. My brain is a fact-free zone. This, at its core, is a simple matter. My love is right. Your love is wrong.

In April 2014, the month of the upcoming election, at least three major political parties – the Aam Aadmi Party, the Congress and the Communist Party of India (Marxist) – had included support for decriminalization of homosexual relations in their election manifestos.

In July 2014, the first book on Genderqueer in Tamil and first Tamil book on LGBTQIA was from Srishti Madurai was released by BJP's state general secretary, Vanathi Srinivasan, at the 6th Hindu spiritual service foundation's sixth service fair, Chennai.

In July 2014, Kochi hosted the 5th All-Kerala Queer Pride Parade was held. It was organised by Queerala (a support group for the LGBTQ community) and Sahayathrika (a rights organisation for lesbian and bisexual women in Kerala).

In September 2014, Sushant Divgikar, the winner of Mr Gay India 2014, participated in the Bigg Boss reality show. About his participation, Divgikar stated, "I think I can sensitise the people about my community by being the face of the LGBT community in Bigg Boss."

In November 2015, Indian Author Siddharth Dube published his memoir No One Else: A Personal History of Outlawed Love and Sex sharing his time as a childhood as gay and effeminate in 1970s Calcutta and coming out to his father in 1984.

It was in this warped atmosphere of endless hierarchies and domination that I first became the target of male desire manifested as sexual abuse. In my second year at Doon School, a huge prefect called Nutty began tormenting me. Nutty was notoriously crazy, hence his nickname. Though I did my utmost to avoid Nutty, there was no escaping him in the second half of the day, after classes ended and we returned to our common residential house. Unfailingly, several nights a week, instead of studying after dinner like my other classmates, I would do an unending series of somersaults on Nutty's orders. "Oaay, do you know what a pansy is?" Nutty once asked in his rough voice. I kept my eyes down. "Yes." "Are you a pansy?" Everyone laughed. I said softly but defiantly, "No, I'm not a pansy." "You're a pansy, you madarchod (motherfuc*er), and you want me to chodo (fuc*) you," Nutty yelled. "You want to give me a blowjob, you pansy! Here, come here, suck it!" This time there were guffaws from his admiring audience. I felt utter hatred for him. I wanted to kill him.

In June 2016, a dating platform called Amour Queer Dating was launched in India, for LGBTIQ people seeking long-term companions.

In April 2017, a ten-episode series titled Romil & Jugal parody of Romeo and Juliet featured two men Jugal and Romil in love fighting for family acceptance and life.

In May 2017, the first Bhopal Pride March was conducted, gathering the participation of around 200 members.

In July 2018, Swati Bidhan Baruah became Assam's first transgender Judge.

On 6 September 2018, the Supreme Court of India invalidated part of Section 377 of the Indian Penal Code making homosexuality legal in India. In striking down the colonial-era law that made gay sex punishable by up to 10 years in prison, one judge said the landmark decision would "pave the way for a better future."

On July 9, 2019, 19-year-old boy Avinshu Patel committed suicide in Chennai after he was ridiculed for being homosexual. "Everyone knows I am a boy. But the way I walk, think and talk is like a girl. People in India do not like that," Avinshu posted on Facebook before killing himself.

=== 2020s ===
In Feb 2020, Praful Pawar killed his 56-year-old gay partner Umesh Patil. The statement recorded:

Pawar and Patil met each other on a local train six months ago and became friends; soon Patil, who was unmarried, started visiting Pawar at the latter's house in Dombivali and they had a homosexual relationship. When Pawar got married, he started avoiding Patil, he said, leading to the souring of their relations. On February 4, Patil visited Pawar when his wife was not at home, and they had a quarrel. Pawar allegedly strangulated Patil and stuffed his body in a bag and dumped it in the bushes by the side of the railway tracks, the police officer said.

In Feb 2020, a 22-year-old salesman was killed by a married textile businessman. "A strained homosexual relationship led to the murder. The deceased was extorting with the threat of making their video go viral. We solved the case within two days," said DCP said DCP (Southwest) Gaurav Sharma.

In March 2020, TV9 Marathi telecasted a show called Arogyam Dhanasampada – Sexual Problems and Solutions with guest speaker, Sanjay Shetye, a clinical psychologist. Despite, The Indian Psychiatric Society and the World Health Organization repeated clarification that homosexuality is not an illness and therefore there is no cure, Sanjay Shetey claimed homosexuality is indeed a disease and there has been an increase in the number of ‘homosexual people.’ In response, a complaint was filed against the channel for promoting homophobia.

Also in 2020, Shyam Konnur, Mr Gay India 2020, spoke about how LGBTQIA+ members have been in a permanent lockdown.

In June 2020, gay couple Nikesh PP and Sonu MS filed a marriage equality case in the Kerala High Court. "The Supreme Court had only decriminalised same-sex relationships but nothing outside of this. But while living in the real world, there are many problems as our relationship is not considered valid," Nikesh told ThePrint over the phone. "We cannot open a joint bank account or sign documents of consent during medical emergencies and now we have to even tick the single box and not the married one on any forms," he said.

On 3 July 2020, Major J Suresh published a Blog titled, Out !! Proud !! Liberated !!, he says,

One of the first things most people ask when someone comes out to them is "When did you first know?" Through my teenage years in high school, I just knew I was a little different. When I was about 15, I was drawn to this rather cute-looking boy in class. He probably noticed me looking at him and decided to 'teach me a lesson' in the only manner young boys know. He surrounded me with some of his close friends and pushed me to the ground, holding me by the neck, while uttering some expletives and probably, that was the end of it. The physical violence was not brutal - far from it - but it most likely drove home a message - a wrong message - but one that gay kids the world over learn from such incidents of bullying: that what I was feeling was 'wrong', 'bad' or 'sick', and if I continued to heed those feelings, it could provoke much worse violence - and so it was best to 'conform'. That is probably why I went through my late teens and early 20s without feeling anything close to what can be called romantic attraction or love during my years at the National Defence Academy (NDA) and Indian Military Academy (IMA). By my mid-20s, when those feelings started slowly resurfacing, I started understanding that I was gay. I struggled really badly to accept myself - and the hyper-straight world of the army only made it that much more difficult for me. However, by my late 20s, after months of drinking and wondering and questioning why I was different and crying myself to sleep over it, I finally came to terms with myself and accepted myself for who I was.

In September 2020, A 25-year-old, Sunny Dayal, who worked with Volvo buses as pantry staff, was killed by two strangers he met on dating apps. Also in 2020, Sundeep Dosanjh and Sharath Puttichanda got married in the USA. 'Medikeri Kodava Samaja' ordered U.S. based Kodava Community to ostracise Sharath. U.S. based Kodava organisation published a statement that marriage is a personal choice.

Dosanjh told HT that he and Puttichanda bonded over their Indian culture, shared values, and how both overcame day-to-day challenges. They even helped each other through some intensely emotional days along the way. It also provided them with a fresh perspective on their relationship, which made them realise that they're meant to be. So, finally, they made the promise to be with each other forever and tied the knot in two types of traditional Indian ceremonies on September 25–26, 2020.

In 2021, Mohammed Siddique confessed to murdering hotelier Mohammed Afroz. "Afroz used to call Siddique repeatedly and demand that they meet," a police officer told the newspaper. "Afroz abused Siddique's girlfriend over the phone to eliminate him."

In June 2022, award winning filmmaker Onir published his memoir I Am Onir and I Am Gay.

In the same year, a 22-year-old LLB student, Yash Rastogi, of Jagriti Vihar in Meerut, went missing after he left to meet the main accused, Shavez, at his workshop in Fatehullapur area on the evening of 26 June. A missing complaint was lodged by Yash's family on the morning of 27 June. Yash's body was recovered from the drain late Saturday night after police detained and questioned Shavez.

In 2023, Supreme Court of India begins hearing plea on acceptance of same-sex marriage in India demanding equal protection, identity and law.

In the 2026 Rajya Sabha elections, lawyer Menaka Guruswamy became India's first openly LGBTQ+ national-level member of Parliament, elected on behalf of the Trinamool Congress.

== Stigma, Phobia, and Violence ==
The prevalent stigma around LGBTQ people often promotes rape culture or non-consensual sexual violence. LGBTQ people who have been abused as a child and adult years restrain from reporting complaints in police stations because of phobia and lack of proper law facilities. This rape culture also leads to confusion regarding one's sexual orientation in their teenage and adult years. For example, male children raped by male adults, female children raped by female adults, or other children subject to homosexual rape may incorrectly think that they are gay, bisexual, or homosexual, while children subject to heterosexual rape may incorrectly think that they are heterosexual. Some may be homosexual but choose heterosexual life, some may be bisexual but choose gay life, or some may be heterosexual but choose homosexual life. Hence, they end up in a life-long cycle of stress, trauma, hatred, and vengeance. Even though, the Indian Psychiatric Society and the World Health Organization have repeatedly warned that sexual orientations are natural and normal, corrective rape culture is promoted in India.

=== Aniket Patil ===
A 25-year-old MBA graduate from Jalgaon killed himself by suicide. According to Times of India report, he joined the multinational company after completing his studies. According, to his suicide note, he said he was bullied and harassed over his sexuality at the Workplace. Activist Ashok Row Kavi said,

This could have been simply avoided if he was counselled. The need of the hour is to have workshops regarding this important issue. In the realm of sexuality and gender, education is key, dialogue about gender and sexuality is essential. Insensitivity can lead to bullying, apart from coming in the way of learning.

=== Anjana Hareesh ===
A 21-year-old bisexual student from Kerala Anjana Hareesh decided to end her life on May 12, 2020, in Goa. She stated in a Facebook video posted in March that her parents forced her into physical abuse, medication, and 'Conversion therapy'. Equal Rights activist Harish Iyer, calls the death of Anjana is a "nasty reminder" of the phobias that exist in society. Speaking to The Quint, Iyer calls Anjana a "victim of bi-phobia."

Sexuality is just a variation and is not an aberration. So what are you trying to convert? It is important that you convert yourself – which being unknowledgeable about sexuality to come to a path of knowledge and wisdom where you understand that two people who love differently are not people who are variants or deviants or anything of that sort. They just love differently.

=== Suicide of Arvey Malhotra ===
A sixteen-year-old teenager Arvey Malhotra from Delhi Public School, Greater Faridabad jumped off the fifteenth-floor building on February 24, 2022, leaving a suicide note, "This school has killed me. Specially higher authorities... tell ninna and bade papa about my sexuality and whatever happened with me. And please try to handle them… You are wonderful, strong, beautiful and amazing." Arvey mother Aarti Malhotra said, "By 9th grade, things worsened. He came home panicking & breathing heavily he'd read a chapter about bullying which triggered him. He confessed, ‘The boys in my class blindfolded me and made me strip. I can't take it anymore’; I was shocked; my son's bullies became sexual assaulters. The school refused to take action; they failed us. It broke my heart. We visited multiple therapists. He was diagnosed with depression & lost his interest in art. In 10th grade, he got diagnosed with dyslexia, studying got difficult for him; his boards were round the corner." On July 6, 2022, Aarti Malhotra shared a post on Instagram quote, "I lost my son, I need justice I really need your help to spread the word, there are no sensitisation training in schools for gender expressions, I lost my son to bullying. I need justice for Arvey." The post crossed 1 million likes and people offered support to her from everywhere.

=== Pilot Adam Harry ===
Adam Harry became India's first trans man trainee pilot assisted by the Kerala government was forced to deliver orders for Zamato citing hormonal therapy and gender dysphoria makes Adam "Unfit" to fly. Adam who wanted to pursue a career in aviation enrolled himself in the Lanseria International Airport in Johannesburg and secured a private pilot license. Later, in 2020, the Kerala Government sanctioned an amount of 23.34 lakhs to Adam to support his dream of flying by getting him enrolled in the Rajiv Gandhi Academy for Aviation Technology in Thiruvananthapuram. Adam filed a petition to which the Ministry of Social Justice and Empowerment calls to the DGCA that its decision to deny a transgender person a commercial pilot licence was discriminatory. Further, the Ministry concludes that it is violative of the Transgender Persons (Protection of Rights) Act, 2019.

== LGBTQ People ==
- Note: This list includes LGBTQ people who are L (Lesbian), G (Gay), B (Bisexual), T (Transgender), and Q (Queer). One's sexual orientation shouldn't be confused with one's gender.

Name	Lifespan	Notoriety	Notes
Arti Agrawal	b.?	Indian Scientist and Engineer	L
Agha Shahid Ali	1949-2001	Indian Poet	G
Aditya Tiwari	b.1998	Indian Poet	G
Abhina Aher	b.1977	Transgender Activist	T
Manish Arora	b. 1973	Fashion Designer	G
Vardaan Arora	b. 1992	Recording Artist and Singer	G
Anjali Ajmeer	b. 1995	Actress	T
Apurva Asrani	b. 1978	Filmmaker and Screenplay writer	G
Pulapre Balakrishnan	b. 1955	Economist	G
Gautam Bhan	b. ?	Writer, Researcher, and Queer Rights Activist	G
Deepak Bhargava	b. 1968	Advocate	G
Dinesh Bhugra	b. 1952	Psychiatrist	G
Shonali Bose	b. 1965	Indian Film Director	B
Dutee Chand	b. 1996	Indian Athlete	L
Benjamin Daimary	b. 2000	Indian Actor	G
Bobby Darling	b. 1974	Actress and Television Personality	T
Dr Prasad Raj Dandekar	b.?	Radio Oncologist	G
Tista Das	b. 1978	Actress and Trans Rights Activist	T
Gazal Dhaliwal	b. 1982	Screenwriter	T
Pawan Dhall	b. ?	Queer activist, archivist, researcher and writer	G
Sidharth Dube	b. 1961	Memorist	G
Pablo Ganguli	b. 1983	Director	G
Siddhartha Gautam	1964-1992	lawyer, AIDs Activist	G
Sonal Giani	b. 1987	Movie Actress and Senior Technical Advisor Diversity & Inclusion at IPPF South Asia Region	B
Amrita Sher-Gil	1913-1941	Painter	B
Menaka Guruswamy	b. 1974	Senior Advocate	L
Manvendra Singh Gohil	b. 1965	LGBTQ and AIDS Activist	G
Abhik Ghosh	b. 1964	Chemist	G
Harish Iyer	b. 1979	Columnist, activist, blogger	G
Navtej Johar	b. 1959	an Indian Sangeet Natak Akademi award-winning Bharatnatyam exponent and choreographer.	G
Arundhati Katju	b. 1982	Lawyer	L
Anurag Kalia	b. ?	IIT Graduate and Software Engineer	G
Firdaus Kanga	b. 1960	Indian Writer	G
Ashok Row Kavi	b. 1947	Indian journalist and LGBTQ rights activist	G
Bhupen Khakhar	1934-2003	Indian Painter	G
Saleem Kidwai	1951-2021	Medieval historian, Professor	G
Bindumadhav Khire	b. ?	Social Worker, Short Fiction Writer	G
Shobhna S. Kumar	b. ?	Publisher Queer Ink.com, the first online bookstore	L
Agniva Lahiri	1979-2016	Indian LGBTQ social activist	
Gopi Shankar Madurai	b. 1991	Indian equal rights and Indigenous rights activis	I
Leena Manimekalai	b. 1980	Indian filmmaker, poet and an actor.	B
Saikat Majumdar	b.?	Novelist	
Shabnam Mausi	b. 1955	Member of the Madhya Pradesh Legislative Assembly	Born (I), T
Hoshang Merchant	b. 1947	Indian Poet	G
Joyita Mondal	b. ?	Member of a judicial panel of a civil court and a social worker	T
Onir	b. 1969	Indian film and TV director, editor, screenwriter and producer	G
Akkai Padmashali	b. ?	Transgender Activist and motivational speaker.	T
Devdutt Pattanaik	b. 1970	Mythologist, Historian	G
Radhika Piramal	b. 1994	Executive vice chairperson, VIP Industries	L
Aishwarya Rutuparna Pradhan	b. 1983	Civil Servant	T
Padmini Prakash	b.?	News Anchor	T
Vasu Primlani	b.?	Comic Artist	L
R. Raj Rao	b. 1955	Novelist	G
Sridhar Rangayan	b. 1962	Gay rights Activist and Filmmaker	G
Sharif D Rangnekar	b. ?	Author, Public Relations Consultants Association of India (PRCAI).	G
Apsara Reddy	b. ?	Indian Politician	T
A. Revathi	b. ?	Author	T
Wendell Rodricks	1960-2020	Fashion Designer and Author	G
Anwesh Sahoo	b. 1995	Indian artist, blogger, writer, model, actor and a TEDx speaker. He won Mr Gay World 2016.	G
Gauri Sawant	b.?	Social Worker	T
Nibedita Sen	b. ?	Author and nominee of Hugo Award	Q
Vikram Seth	b. 1952	Novelist	B
Chayanika Shah	b. 1970	Educator	L
Parmesh Shahani	b. ?	Head, Godrej India Culture Lab	G
Parvez Sharma	b. 1976	Filmmaker	G
Aneesh Sheth	b. 1982	Actress	T
Pragati Singh	b. ?	Doctor	A
Kalki Subramaniam	b. ?	Activist	T
Keshav Suri	b. 1985	Executive director of The Lalit Suri Hospitality Group, Businessman	G
Manil Suri	b. 1959	Author	G
Ruth Vanita	b. 1955	Historian	L
Rose Venkatesan	b. 1980	Talk Show Host	T
Living Smile Vidya	b. ?	Actor and Director	T
Riyad Vinci Wadia	1967-2003	Filmmaker known for short film BOMgAY	G
Gautam Yadav	b.?	Queer Activist	G
Manohar Elavarthi	b. 1971	Founder of Sangama	B

== Timeline ==
Date	Event	Reference
1200 BC - 600 BC	The Hindu medical journal Sushruta Samhita documents homosexuality and attempts to explain the cause of homosexuality in a neutral/scientific manner. Though there were many "Sushruta"s who were involved in writing the journal, Sushruta Samhita lived in Varanasi during his life.	
900 BC to 700 BC	The Brahmana describes an instance of same-sex relations among Hindu deities: On the nights of the new moon, Mitra injects his semen into Varuna to start the moon cycle, with the favour returned upon the full moon.	
500 BC	The Hindu epic of Ramayana describes Hanuman witnessing two homosexuals engaged in intimacy on the island of Lanka.	
[600 BC to] 100 BC	The Pali canon is written, inscribing the words of Gautama Buddha stating that sexual relations, whether of homosexual or of heterosexual nature, is forbidden in the monastic code, and states that any acts of soft homosexual sex (such as masturbation and interfumeral sex) does not entail a punishment but must be confessed to the monastery. These codes apply to monks only and not to the general population. The Pali Canon was largely written in Sri Lanka but based on the words of Buddha in India.	
200 BC	The Nāradasmṛti is written in South India and declares homosexuality to be unchangeable and forbid homosexuals from marrying a partner of the opposite sex. The Nāradasmṛti lists fourteen types of panda (men who are impotent with women); among these are the mukhebhaga (men who have oral sex with other men), the sevyaka (men who are sexually enjoyed by other men) and the irshyaka (the voyeur who watches other men engaging in sex).	
200s	The Kama Sutra is written describing various homosexual acts positively.	
300s	Tamil Sangam literature refers to relationships between two men and explores the lives of trans women in the Aravan cult in Koovagam village in Tamil Nadu.	
885	Khajuraho temples are built depicting numerous statues engaging homosexual sex on the walls of its temples	
1500s	During the Mughal Empire, a number of the pre-existing Delhi Sultanate laws were combined into the Fatawa-e-Alamgiri, mandating several types of punishments for homosexuality, up to stoning to death for a Muslim.	
1500s	The Goa Inquisition by the Portuguese criminalizes male homosexual sex throughout Portuguese India.	
1791	Homosexuality was decriminalised in the French Indian territories of Pondicherry	
1861	The colonial government of British India impose Section 377 criminalizing all homosexual sex throughout British India.	
1871	The British labeled the hijra population as a "criminal tribe"	
09/2018	The Supreme Court of India repeals colonial-era law criminalizing homosexual sex	
08/2022	The Supreme Court of India provides LGBTQ with family rights and live-in couple rights equal to that of married couples	
01/2023	The leader of the far-right Hindu Nationalist RSS advocates in favor of LGBTQ rights	

== See also ==
- Timeline of South Asian and diasporic LGBTQ and queer history
- Kolkata Rainbow Pride Walk
- Recognition of same-sex unions in India
- LGBTQ rights in India
- LGBTQ literature in India
