= LGBTQ literature in India =

LGBTQ literature in India is Indian writing that addresses LGBTQ+ themes or is written by LGBTQ+ authors. Influential works of queer writing in the Indian canon include historic South Asian writing, works published in India, and works written by the Indian diaspora.

== History ==
Indian works in the ancient, medieval, and modern eras have addressed themes of sexuality and gender. In 2009, the Delhi High Court struck down Section 377, a law banning sex between adults of the same sex. This caused a rapid rise in the amount and types of LGBTQ+ works released in India. When the Supreme Court read down part of the same law in 2018, a further growth in LGBTQ+ publishing followed.

=== Ancient era ===
Some literature in ancient India dealt with queer themes and included depictions of queer characters or subtext.^{:651-654} Ancient and medieval literature portrayed gender as fluid. Literary tropes about same-sex love included themes of celibacy and intense friendship; justifications that one's rebirth allowed their current love to transcend social rules; and transformation of one's sex in order to pursue an attraction. Scholars Ruth Vanita and Saleem Kidwai have analyzed representations of homoerotic love in ancient Indian literature, and Vanita is a particularly influential scholar in the field.^{:651-654}

The Mahabharata, an ancient Hindu epic, contains many examples of same-sex attachment. The most prominent is the friendship between Krishna and Arjuna, which shapes their conversation in the Bhagvad Gita. Rohit K Dasgupta views Krishna's resurrection of Arjuna's stillborn son as a form of procreation via their friendship.^{:651-653} The Mahabharata also describes the gender transformation of Amba, a princess who had been abducted by Bhishma. Via prayers, Amba is reborn and later transformed into a man in order to achieve revenge.

In the Ramayana, Hanuman observes women kissing each other in Lanka and the palace of Ravana. In the Markandeya Purana, Avikshita says she is a woman and refuses to marry, even though she was perceived as a prince. Vātsyāyana's Kamasutra explicitly describes and recommends queer sexual practices.^{:651-654}

=== Medieval era ===
Notable medieval depictions of same-sex love include Somaprabha and Kalingasena in the Kathasaritsagara by Somadeva and the two mothers of Bhagiratha who conceived with Sankara's blessing in the Bengali Kritivasa Ramayana. The tale of Shiva's pursuit by Vishnu in the form of Mohini inspired a late medieval edition where the pair's union via ayoni bore a child, Ayyappa.^{:651-654} Babur's memoirs include passionate and normalized descriptions of his love for his young wife and a male youth.

In the medieval period, Perso-Arabic literature had a strong influence on the way love was depicted in South Asian literature. The 10th century relationship between Mahmud of Ghazna and his slave Malik Ayaz inspired later ghazals depicting it as a perfect love. Zulali Khwansari's Mathnawi-yi Zulali also describes their sexual relationship in a positive light: in general, this literary tradition was notable for its consistent, explicit referrals to same-sex love and its happy ending. Sufi poetry often used the imagery of love between men in representing spiritual themes, like Amir Khusro's poetry about Nizamuddin Chisti.^{:656-659}

The Bhakti movement also shaped literary depictions of love in the medieval period. Because it encouraged people to worship gods as familial relations, including lovers, it expanded opportunities to discuss same-sex love. Poets like Surdas, Tulsidas, Mirabai, and Vithabai sang about queer themes. Some public same-sex relationships were condoned as the longing of a disciple for a god's reincarnation and became the subject of literary works. Jagannatha Dasa and Shri Chaitanya inspired Dibakar Das's Jagannath Charitamrita.^{:654-655}

Some Persian poetry condoned or denounced the practice of shahid-bazi, or poetry describing the author's love or attraction to boys, and this influenced later Indian poets like Shah Mubarak Abroo and Mir Taqi Mir, who explicitly referenced their attraction to men and youths. Urdu rekhti poetry sometimes discussed homoerotic attachments between women, like Insha Allah Khan's "Noble Lady", and transgressive queer themes surrounding rekhti poetry ultimately led to its suppression.^{:656-659}

=== 1800-1980 ===
British colonial rule involved the imposition of laws like Section 377 which persecuted LGBTQ+ people in South Asia. Colonialism affected cultural institutions, including by rigidly casting queer people and themes as unnatural and wrong. The British led campaigns to censor queer themes from popular and historic texts and replace overtly queer and queer-coded literary traditions with new ones.^{:661-662} 19th century poets like Altaf Hussain Hali and Muhammad Husain Azad led campaigns to remove homoerotic themes from Urdu poetry.^{:664}

Pandey Bechan Sharma's 1924 story collection, Chocolate, focused on male homosexuality and included characters who criticize trends they notice and worry about: rising homosexuality, love of boys, and youths who transgress gender norms. However, the book contained some positive depictions of homosexuality as well. Chocolate sparked debate about homoerotic literature and was condemned by many in the Hindi writing sphere, led by Banarsidas Chaturvedi. In reaction, the 1953 edition of Chocolate included several forewords that argued the book intended to condemn homosexuality.^{:664} In 1936, Urdu poet Firaaq Gorakhpuri defended same-sex love as a universal phenomenon in an essay on ghazals, inspiring more Urdu poetry with homosexual themes.^{:664}

Lihaaf, an Urdu short story collection by Ismat Chughtai, was another influential modern queer and feminist work. The short story it is named after, "Lihaaf", explored intersectional issues of abuse, desire, and class. Controversy after its publication sparked an obscenity trial against Chughtai. Literary depictions of queer relationships continued with the Hindi work Ek Sadak Sattavan Galiyaan ("A Street with 57 Lanes") by Kamleshwar Prasad Saxena, which depicts characters grappling with relationship issues in Uttar Pradesh.

In 1973, Kamala Das began publishing her autobiography My Story in Malayalam, which included frank depictions of her same-sex desires. The work was popular and resulted in large controversy. In 1977, Shakuntala Devi published The World of the Homosexuals, which was one of the earliest English-language books of Indian queer literature. In 1978, Karichan Kunju published Pasitha Manidam, a Tamil novel about Ganesan's return to his restrictive hometown and deals with leprosy treatment and processing his sexuality and trauma.

=== 1980-2015 ===
In the 1980s, Vijay Tendulkar produced Mitrachi Ghoshta, a Marathi play that was influential for having a lesbian protagonist. Mahesh Dattani was one of the most prominent playwrights on queer issues, including Bravely Fought the Queen and On a Muggy Night in Mumbai.^{:239}

Throughout the 1980s, Suniti Namjoshi published many works on women and sexuality, including the influential Feminist Fables. In 1990, India's first magazine targeted at gay men, Bombay Dost, was founded by Ashok Row Kavi. Giti Thandani, who founded India's first collective for lesbians and bisexual women, wrote Sakhiyani: Lesbian Desire in Ancient and Modern India.^{:237-238} That same year, Firdaus Kanga published the autobiographical queer memoir, Trying to Grow. In 2003, R. Raj Rao published The Boyfriend, followed soon by Bindumadhav Khire's Partner, Neel Mukherjee's A Life Apart, Minal Hajratwala's Leaving India: My Family's Journey From Five Villages to Five Continents, and Rahul Mehta's Quarantine.

In 2011, the American journalist Joseph Lelyveld published Great Soul, a biography of Gandhi. It suggested Gandhi could have been bisexual and shared details of his relationship with Hermann Kallenbach. The book was banned in Gujarat and several other states, but its censorship was criticized by Gandhi's family and Indian LGBTQ organizations.

Major recent developments in queer theory include academic writing by R. Raj Rao; Ruth Vanita and Saleem Kidwai's foundational Same-Sex Love in India: A Literary History; and Hoshang Merchant's Yaraana: Gay Writing From South Asia.^{:235-237} Other influential texts include early publications of Yoda Press: Gautam Bhan and Arvind Narrain's Because I Have a Voice: Queer Politics in India, and Maya Sharma's Loving Women: Being Lesbian in Unprivileged India. Zubaan also published historic texts with A Life in Trans Activism by A. Revathi and Nandini Murali and No Outlaws in the Gender Galaxy by Chayanika Shah, Raj Merchant, Shals Mahajan and Smriti Nevatia.

=== Recent years ===
Many contemporary writers of Indian queer literature write about queer themes with more nuance and deeper representation than in the previous century. These include representing experiences across genders and sexualities, as well as intersectional experiences across caste and abilities.

Some of these authors, both Indian and of the Indian diaspora, include Suniti Namjoshi, Arundhati Roy, Akhil Katyal, Aditya Tiwari, Hansda Sowvendra Shekhar, Megha Majumdar, Anushka Jasraj, Vikram Chandra, Vikram Seth, Sachin Kundalkar, Amruta Patil, Anjali Joseph, Vasudhendra, Saikat Majumdar, Jerry Pinto, Sandip Roy, and Aditi Angiras. Saurabh Sharma reviews some of these authors' works as being more affirming with more accurate representation of queer identities and themes than others. However, the writers cover a wide variety of topics, across many different writing forms. Their literature is written and translated into a variety of languages, including regional languages like Marathi and Kannada.

Autobiographies by trans people have been published recently with the goal of sharing trans and hijra experiences with cisgender readers. Since 2010, major publications include: The Truth About Me: A Hijra Life Story by A Revathi, I Am Vidya by Living Smile Vidya, Me Hijra, Me Laxmi by Laxmi, We Are Not The Others by Kalki Subramaniam, and The Yellow Sparrow by Santa Khurai.

== Publishing world ==
=== Publishers ===
By the 1990s, Indian publishers rarely published works of queer literature. Some LGBTQ-themed English-language academic texts had recently been published. More publishers released LGBTQ+ works throughout the 21st century, and senior publishers working in the area in 2023 believed it would continue to slowly expand.

Arpita Das began Yoda Press's "Sexualities Series" in 2005, which expanded Indian queer literature away from academic titles. Independent presses like Yoda Press were the first modern publishers to platform marginalized authors writing about their own communities. Presses like Zubaan, Women Unlimited, Navayana, Panther's Paw, and Niyogi Books were founded with the specific motivation to share works from queer and Dalit authors. Mainstream publishers like Penguin and Simon & Schuster have also published queer works, but this generally followed the mainstreaming of queer writing via small publishers. Other small queer presses include Queer Publishing House and Speaking Tiger. Westland Books launched the Queer Directions imprint through Karthika VK and Parmesh Shahani, and Seagull Books has a Pride list.

Many of these publishers focus on English-language editions, which many marginalized readers from accessing the writing. Some presses are working on developing more works in translation to expand their reach and communicate across language communities.

The Queer Muslim Project, founded by Rafiul Alom, publishes and supports queer writers. Their Queer Writers' Room mentors new South Asian writers in partnership with the University of Iowa's International Writing Program. Sappho for Equality is an LGBTQ rights organization that runs workshops and events, along with publishing works about LGBTQ topics.

=== Magazines ===
Periodicals addressing the LGBTQ+ community and themes begin with Bombay Dost, founded in 1990. In 1997, the Stree Sangam Bombay collective began publishing Scripts. They were followed by Gaysi in 2008, The Queer Chronicle and Pink Pages in 2009, and Gaylaxy in 2010. Sappho for Equality publishes Swakanthe, containing articles in Bengali and English.

=== Events and awards ===
In 2018, Queer LitFest began in Chennai, and was the first Indian literature festival dedicated to the LGBTQ community. The Awadh Queer Literature Festival later began in Lucknow.

In 2018, an LGBT Marathi literature festival started in Pune. It became Mooknayak, a festival prioritizing LGBTQ+ Marathi literature, run by the Bindu Queer Rights Foundation and Yutak Charitable Trust within the Akhil Bharatiya Marathi Sahitya Sammelan. They had held four festivals by 2025, and hoped to expand to English and Hindi literature the next year.

In 2019, Sharif D. Rangnekar founded Rainbow Lit Fest in order to provide a literary event dedicated to gender and sexual minorities in India. In 2023, they founded the Rainbow Awards for Literature and Journalism to recognize LGBTQ+ writing by Indian authors. Eligible works must be written in English or translated from an Indian language into English. As of 2025, the festival had met five times, for a predominantly English and Hindi-language audience. They hoped to become more inclusive for marginalized attendees, but needed more funds to fund flights for people from rural and remote areas.

=== Bookstores ===
Arpita Das, founder of Yoda Press, began the independent bookstore Yodakin in 2009 in Hauz Khas Village, Delhi. It platformed books from marginalized communities and supported queer literary events. Queer Ink is the first openly queer bookstore established in India. It was founded in 2010 in Mumbai by Shobhna Kumar, an out lesbian who wanted to increase the accessibility of LGBTQ+ books in India. In 2019, Radhika Timbadia started Champaca Bookstore, a cafe and store in Bengaluru. It highlights indie publications and underrepresented stories, including queer literature. In August 2025, Prarthana Prasad opened Beku, a queer-affirming café and bookstore in South Bengaluru.
