= Joyita =

Joyita may refer to:

- MV Joyita, a merchant vessel from which 25 people mysteriously disappeared in the South Pacific in 1955
- La Joyita Prison, in Panama
- Joyita Mondal (fl. 2017), Bengali transgender woman judge
