= Siraj-ud-Din Ali Khan Arzu =

Mughal Indian Urdu language poet (1687–1756)

Siraj-ud-Din Ali Khan (Urdu: سراج الدین علی خاں آرزو, romanized: Sirāj ad-Dīn 'Alī Xā̃ Ārzō) (1687–1756), also known by his pen name Arzu, was a Delhi-based poet, linguist and lexicographer of the Mughal Empire. He used to write mainly in Persian, but he also wrote 127 couplets in Urdu. He was the maternal-uncle of Mir Taqi Mir. He taught Mir Taqi Mir, Mirza Muhammad Rafi Sauda, Mirza Mazhar Jan-e-Janaan and Najm-ud-Din Shah Mubarak Abroo, who also composed Persian literature.

Arzu was born in Agra. He was the son of Sheikh Hisam-ud-Din, a soldier who held many high offices in the court of the Mughal emperor Aurangzeb. He was highly proficient in Persian and Arabic, the two languages which he learned as a child. He also learned Urdu and Sanskrit.

Arzu started writing at the age of fourteen, and came to Delhi in 1719. He was introduced to Nawab Qamar-ud-din Khan by Anand Ram Mukhlis. Qamar-ud-Din, who was the prime minister at that time, gave him a suitable job. Arzu used to hold mushairas at his home, and attracted many disciples including Mir Taqi Mir. In 1751, he wrote an Urdu-Persian dictionary called the Navadirul Alfaz. He migrated to Lucknow in 1754, and subsequently to Ayodhya, which was once the residence of his great-grandfather. He died in Lucknow in 1756, and was buried in the Vakilpura area of Delhi.

== Influence ==
Khan-i Arzu was the first scholar to suggest that the Sanskrit belongs to the Indo-European language family tree, in his Persian-language philological treatise Muzmir ("Fruitful").

== Literary works ==
Arzu's works include:

- Siraj-ul-Lughat (a lexicon of Persian which also discusses the relationship between Persian and Sanskrit)
- Chiragh-e-Hidayat (a glossary of words and idioms used by the Persian poets)
- Nawadir-ul-Alfaz (a glossary of Indic words)
- Several ghazals and qasidas
- Diwan-e-Asar Sherazi
- Mohibbat-e-Uzma (a treatise on prosody)
- Atiya-e-Kubra (another work on prosody)
- Miyar-ul-Afkar (a treatise on grammar)
- Payam-i-Shauq (a collection of letters)
- Josh-o-Kharosh (masnavi)
- Mehr-o-Mah
- Ibrat Fasana
- Gulzar-i Khayal (a long poem on Holi and the coming of the spring)
- Muzmir ("fruitful" in Arabic, a treatise on philology and linguistics)

== See also ==
- Persian language in the Indian subcontinent
