= PLUS Kolkata =

- Formation: March 2003
- Founder: Late Agniva Lahiri
- Type: Non Governmental Organisation (Registered Society)
- VAT ID no.: AAAAP5716B (Pan Number)
- Legal status: Tax exempted
- Headquarters: 254, Banamali Banerjee Road
- Location: Kolkata
- Coordinates: 22.2850°N 88.2015°E
- Region served: West Bengal, India
- Executive Director: Late Agniva Lahiri
- President: Subharthi Mukherjee
- Board of directors: Subharthi Mukherjee, Subir Das, Bhanu Buduk, Bapi Dey, Amit Sarkar ( treasurer ), Chiranjit Bose, Shambhu Shaw
- Subsidiaries: Prothoma Shelter Homes
- Affiliations: United Nations Office on Drugs and Crime; Stop TB Partnership
- Staff: 11 to 25
- Website: Official website facebook

People Like Us (PLUS) Kolkata is a non governmental organisation, founded by Late Agniva Lahiri, based in Kolkata, India working for the emotional, social, educational and economic upbringing of the transgender population and LGBT community in general. Apart from other activities, the organisation runs a shelter homes, Prothoma, for the community in Kolkata, Bihar and Uttar Pradesh.

== Profile ==
Today, I understand the reasons for society’s hostility towards me and people like me. They do not want us because we challenge their entrenched notions of gender and sexuality. Generally, people are afraid of the unknown. And because of the fear of the unknown, they do not want to know. This breeds a vicious circle, says Agniva Lahiri, Executive Director of PLUS Kolkata.

People Like Us (PLUS) Kolkata started its operations in 2000, when Agniva Lahiri, a Kolkata-based transgender, felt that the organisation she was working with, Prajaak, was inadequate to accommodate the full spectrum of her activities. Working as an informal group for one year, PLUS Kolkata started its functioning as an unregistered group in 2001 and two years later, registered itself as an NGO in March 2003. The primary activities of the organisation cover social awareness programs, medical assistance and health care, shelter, financial assistance and counseling.

The organisation is based at its secretariat in Kolkata and is run by an elected 7 member board of directors, headed by Lahiri. The functional management rests with its president, Subharthi Mukherjee. The Government of India has approved tax exemption facility to the organisation.

== Mission ==
PLUS Kolkata is mandated to extend social, educational, financial and emotional support to gender variant people, sex workers and other communities stigmatised by the society. It works for the promotion, protection and advancement of gender variant people and their health and sexual rights.

== Programs ==
PLUS Kolkata, operates in three Indian states, West Bengal, Bihar and Uttar Pradesh, has a string of programs for achieving its declared mandate. One of the main activities of the organisation centres around Prothoma, a walk in shelter for people from the community as well as sex workers and victims of sex trafficking in general. The shelter, reported to be the first of its kind for transgender community, has housed people like migrant folk entertainers from Bihar. The centre provides the inmates with free shelter for 15 days, extendable to 3 months in special cases, and free or subsidised food. It also works as a walk in place for watching television, reading books and interacting with other members of the community.

The centre has facility for health care and counselling, employing 2 specialist counsellors and two in-house counsellors. It has also put in place facilities for medical care of its inmates. A core area of functioning relates to HIV prevention through public awareness programs and clinical service. The organization has formed a partnership with Stop TB Partnership, a WHO associate, for the prevention of Tuberculosis and this program is supported by the Government of India initiative called Revised National Tuberculosis Control Programme. They have associated with UNDP for support activities for the MSM and TG communities. The organization has also conducted studies on young boys in the sex market and has contributed with efforts towards their rehabilitation by setting up shelter homes in Bihar and Uttar Pradesh, modelled on Prothoma.

PLUS Kolkata has participated as a survey assistant in the study title A cross sectional study to explore the HIV/AIDS related knowledge, attitude and practice and their associations with HIV prevalence among Men having sex with Men population of Kolkata, West Bengal, India conducted in Kolkata. supported by Jonathan and Karin Fielding School of Public Health, University of California, Los Angeles with help from National Institute of Cholera and Enteric Diseases, Kolkata from 1 August 2015 to 30 April 2016.

PLUS Kolkata has also participated in SRHR ( Sexual Reproductive Health and Rights ) forming a National youth coalition in 2014.

The organisation, in a collaboration with DLSA ( District Legal Service Authority ) started a service on legal clinic in February 2017, which is absolutely free of cost for all, specially for the Transgender community. The clinic is presently active on every Wednesday and Friday at 11 AM to 4 PM at the Prothoma Shelter Home, 95 Narkeldanga Main Road, Kolkata- 54

== Approaches ==
The approach of the organization is two-pronged. It runs protection programs for the vulnerable members of the community and intervention and support programs for the sex workers and transgender people.

== Affiliations and associations ==
PLUS Kolkata is affiliated to the United Nations Office on Drugs and Crime and Stop TB Partnership, a worldwide NGO, partnered by and based at the World Health Organization (WHO) headquarters in Geneva, working towards the eradication of tuberculosis disease.

== Awards and recognitions ==
PLUS Kolkata was recognised for its services by the Joint United Nations Programme on HIV/AIDS (UNAIDS) when they conferred the Red Ribbon Award on the organization in 2008.
