= Padmini Prakash =

Indian news anchor, actress and transgender rights activist

- Born: Coimbatore, Tamil Nadu
- Occupations: News anchor; actress; transgender rights activist
- Known for: First trans news anchor in India

Padmini Prakash is an Indian news anchor, actress and transgender rights activist. She became the first openly trans person to work as a news anchor in India when she joined the Tamil channel Lotus News Channel on 15 August 2014.

== Early life and education ==
Padmini was born into a conservative Tamil family in Coimbatore, Tamil Nadu. Padmini was disowned by her family who rejected her gender identity, at the age of 13. She left her home at age 16, and has not been in contact with her family since then. After leaving home, she was supported by her cousin Prakash. She completed her school education and applied for a distance-learning correspondence course for a Bachelor's degree in Commerce, which she was forced to drop out of after her second year due to financial setbacks as well discrimination and bullying for her gender identity.

Padmini transitioned in 2004, and married her husband Nagraj Prakash in the same year. Nagraj Prakash is her cousin, whose family had taken her in when she was forced to leave her family home. The couple have adopted a son Jaya together. She was encouraged by her husband, a goldsmith, to complete her education. He wanted her to become an IAS officer, but could not fulfil that dream due to their financial setbacks.

== Career ==
On 15 August 2014, India's Independence Day, Padmini hosted the 7 pm news bulletin on the Tamil channel Lotus News Channel, becoming the first Indian trans woman to be a television news anchor. The news channel started looking for transgender news anchors after the landmark NALSA judgment which gave transgender people the right to self-identify as male, female or third gender, and granted many more recognitions and protections for the transgender community in India. She was given two months training by Lotus News of voice modulation.

Padmini is also a classically trained dancer who has previously taught Bharatnatyam. She has also acted in Tamil soap operas and participated in transgender beauty pageants. She was crowned Miss Transgender India in 2009 and Miss Transgender Tamil Nadu in 2007.

Padmini Prakash was commended by Rose Venkatesan, who was India's first transgender talk show hostess, in Ippadikku Rose on Star Vijay TV. In fact, Rose was the one who recommended Padmini for the job at Lotus News.
