= Gay Bombay =

LGBT Collective

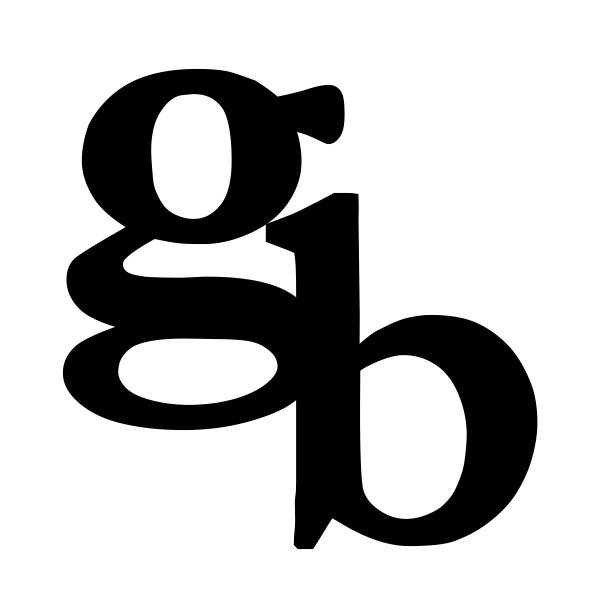
- Abbreviation: GB
- Formation: September 1998; 28 years ago
- Type: Collective
- Legal status: Active
- Purpose: Creating Safe Spaces
- Headquarters: Mumbai, India
- Location: Mumbai
- Members: 6,000+ (As of July 2009)
- Core Members: Balachandran Ramaiah, Deepak Mehra, Harpreet Chhachhia, Jayesh Desai, Sachin Jain, Chetan Dhavse, Anand Makhija, Manoj Dimri, Ameya Phadnis
- Website: gaybombay.in

Gay Bombay is an LGBTQ social organization in Mumbai, India, which promotes LGBT rights. It was founded in 1998. The organization works to create an awareness of gay rights through workshops, film screenings, and parties. The organisation aims to create a safe space for the LGBT community.

== History ==
Gay Bombay was founded in 1998. It is one of Mumbai's longest-running gay support groups, which has been hosting parties in different clubs since 2000.

== Activities ==
Gay Bombay organizes various LGBT events including dance parties, picnics, film festivals, film screenings parents meeting, trekking, cooking, speed-dating brunches, counselling sessions, meet-ups, gatherings, and discussions on topics such as HIV/AIDS and relationships.

In July 2009, Gay Bombay organized a party to celebrate the Delhi High Court's verdict on decriminalizing homosexuality in India. In 2008, the Queer Media Collective Awards was started by Gay Bombay to acknowledge and honor the media's support of the LGBT movement in India.

It organizes a talent show every year, Gay Bombay Talent Show, to provide a platform for LGBT artists.

In May 2017, Gay Bombay paid tribute to Dominic D'Souza, India's first AIDS activist by showing a short film on Positive People, an NGO founded by D'Souza.

== In popular culture ==
The book Gay Bombay: Globalization, Love and (Be)longing in Contemporary India (2008) by Parmesh Shahani, is based on characters and situations that the members of Gay Bombay experienced, reportedly to Mint.

== See also ==
- LGBT history in India
- LGBT culture in India
- List of LGBT rights organizations
