= Shah Mubarak Abroo =

- Born: Najamuddin Shah Mubarak Ābroo
- Known for: Poetry

Najamuddin Shah Mubarak Ābroo (1683–1733) was an Indian poet. He was born in Gwalior, the grandson of Muhammad Ghaus Gwaliori, and hailed from a family of mystics. Over the course of his life he cemented himself as one of the most renowned writers in Northern India of his time. Born during the reign of the Mughal Emperor Aurangzeb he died during the reign of the Mughal Emperor Muhammad Shah during whose time Urdu had become a common language and installed as the court language. He was one of the first to implement this language into poetic writings, and the majority of his work utilizing it revolved around a non-existent love interest that he claimed to be infatuated with.

Ābroo made extensive use of īhām (pun) in his poetry and was influenced by Sanskrit language through Brajbhasha and Indianised Persian poetry. His style of dual-meaning writing is still prominent today, and was quite successful in expressing dichotomies, especially in love. He was a disciple of Siraj-ud-Din Ali Khan Arzu of Agra.
