= Karichan Kunju =

Tamil short-story writer and novelist

R. Narayanaswami (1919-1992), popularly known by his pen name Karichan Kunju, was a Tamil short-story writer and novelist who wrote mainly on historical themes.

== Works ==
- Understanding the Vedas: Highlighting the Spirituality and Wisdom in the Vedas
- Hungry Humans
