= Agniva Lahiri =

- Born: 22 August 1979; Kolkata
- Died: 20 September 2016 (aged 37)
- Occupation: LGBTQ Social activist
- Website: People Like Us (PLUS) Kolkata

Agniva Lahiri (22 August 1979 – 20 September 2016) was an Indian LGBTQ social activist from Kolkata, who was active in promoting the causes of the transgender members of the community. Lahiri founded People Like Us (PLUS) Kolkata, a Non Governmental Organization, in 2001 and served as its executive director. Lahiri was also associated with Network of Asia Pacific Youth as a coordinator for policy research and international advocacy.

== Biography ==
Agniva Lahiri was born on 22 August 1979, biologically a male, to a government servant and an economics school teacher, as the youngest of their three children, in Kolkata, India. Lahiri's early schooling was in Ramakrishna Mission Residential School and graduate studies at Asutosh College, Kolkata. Subsequently, Lahiri took master's degree in Bengali Literature from University of Calcutta and another master's degree in Sociology from Nagarjuna University, Kolkata and is pursuing higher studies at University of Melbourne.

The realization that feminine emotions ruled within a biologically male body came to Lahiri at a very early age. This drew a lot of criticism from Lahiri's teachers and fellow students. But the discriminatory treatments did not stop Lahiri from making the decision to accept oneself as the other gender.

Lahiri died on 20 September 2016, reportedly due to liver failure.

== Social activism ==
Agniva Lahiri's social career started with joining a forum called Pratyay, a division of Praajak, a gay support forum started in 1992 on Kolkata. Lahiri also started a newsletter called Pratyay Arshi Nagar, with contributions even from the college faculty. The newsletter later grew to be a newspaper by name, Manashi.

Lahiri's social activism was kickstarted by an incident on 7 December 2003, with the assault by a group of people. Lahiri filed a complaint with the local police who declined to register a formal case against the perpetrators. Lahiri and colleagues persisted and were successful in getting a First Information Report filed.

Lahiri has been involved with the Network of Asia Pacific Youth as a coordinator in the research on sexual culture and its relevance in the area of HIV intervention and prevention program. Lahiri's past associations are with UNICEF ROSA in 2002 on Child welfare, with Gender and AIDS Training Institute (GATI). and with UNFPA as a young researcher.

Lahiri is presently the Executive Director of People Like Us (PLUS) Kolkata which runs a destitute home in Kolkata called Prothoma, offering shelter for the victims of human trafficking and unsafe migration and standing up against the violence meted out to them. The activities have attracted public attention and UNAIDS (United Nations AIDS Program) released a small grant of ₹ 400,000 with which Lahiri organised a forum for transgender people by name, the Indian Network of Male Sex Workers. The forum now has 22 branches in 14 states of India.

== People Like Us (PLUS) Kolkata ==
Agniva Lahiri started the establishment of an organization for transgender people and gender variant men in 2000 and informally started the organization, People Like Us (PLUS) Kolkata in 2001. The organization was registered as an NGO in March 2003. The organization is working as a social forum for the rights of gender variant men and is involved in the HIV and AIDS related activities such as:

- prevention
- counselling, training and rehabilitation
- research
- intervention in issues like human trafficking

== See also ==
- Gender neutrality
- LGBT community
- LGBT rights by country or territory
- LGBT social movements
- List of LGBT-related organizations
- List of transgender-related topics
- PLUS Kolkata
