= Abhina Aher =

Indian transgender activist

- Born: Abhijeet Aher; 19 September 1977 (age 48); Mumbai, Maharashtra, India
- Occupation: Trans activist

Abhina Aher is an Indian transgender activist who has worked for transgender empowerment. She has worked with organizations such as The Humsafar Trust (Mumbai), Family Health International (FHI), Johns Hopkins University Centre for Communication Programme (CCP) and India HIV/AIDS Alliance. She is also an artist and the founder of Dancing Queens - a dancing group of transgender people. Abhina is also a TedX Speaker and has delivered talks in Delhi and Varanasi. She is currently associated with I-TECH India as Technical Expert, Key Populations. She has more than two decades of experience in the HIV/AIDs sector. She has worked with various communities including men who have sex with men, transgender people, women engaged in sex work, intravenous drug users, and people living with HIV. She was also the programme manager of the Global Fund-supported programme 'Pehchan'.

== Personal life ==
Abhina was born as Abhijeet Aher in a middle-class maharashtrian family in Mumbai. Her mother was a trained Kathak dancer and worked for a government organization. She often performed at official functions. Abhina used to observe her keenly and tried to imitate her in private. Her father died when she was three years old. She was raised by her mother alone and remarried later on.

== Biography ==
Aher participates in pride parades and works with national and international organisations to bring change for the trans community of India. She has been or is involved in different capacity with various organisations. She is a HIV consultant on trans issues for Global Action for Trans Equality She is a steering committee member at the International Trans Fund United States. She is a consultant of sexuality and gender projects and a national programme manager of the Pehchan programme at the India HIV/AIDS Alliance. She is involved in Programme in Charge Communication on MARPs, USAID grant at Johns Hopkins University Centre for Communication. She is chair at Asia Pacific Transgender Network Bangkok, Thailand.

Aher is the founder of a transgender dancing group called Dancing Queens. The group aims to use dance and expressions as a medium to break barriers and works on trans advocacy. The group was founded in 2009 and has performed in different cities. In the year 2016, she also founded Tweet Foundation for empowering transgender individuals.

Abhina experiences trouble during travelling when the officials for security at airports are curious about her transgender status. There has been several incidents at international airports where security officials (Both male and female) have refused to check her. She stands firm and explains them and try to sensitise them which is part of advocacy work that she does for the trans community.

== Awards and accolades ==
- 2014: REX awardee fellowship for her work towards trans empowerment in India.
- 2017: Global Innovator from Human Rights Campaign
