= Arti Agrawal =

Indian scientist and engineer

- Education: Indian Institute of Technology, Delhi
- Scientific career
- Fields: Physics, optics and engineering
- Doctoral advisor: Anurag Sharma

Arti Agrawal is a scientist and engineer known for her work on computational photonics as well as diversity, equity, and inclusion in STEM; she has been recognized in both of these areas by a number of awards. Her research is focused on numerical modeling and simulation of photonic devices and optical components. Agrawal is currently serving as Associate Professor and the Director of Women in Engineering and Information Technology at the University of Technology Sydney and Associate Vice President of Diversity for the IEEE Photonics Society.

== Early life and education ==
Agrawal was born in New Delhi, India. She earned her Ph.D. in Physics at the Indian Institute of Technology, Delhi in 2005, developing mathematical techniques to study optical beam propagation in waveguides with Anurag Sharma. Agrawal was awarded a Royal Society Postdoctoral Fellowship to study photonic crystal fibers at the City, University of London; she then spent almost a decade working there as a researcher, lecturer, and PhD adviser.

== Research and career ==
Agrawal is an author or editor of a number of books on computational photonics and over 50 peer-reviewed articles. She teaches physics, optics, and engineering courses. Her areas of expertise include finite element methods, solar cells, photonic crystal fibers, nanophotonics, non-paraxial optics, supercontinuum generation, and biomedical optics.

Agrawal has engaged with numerous organizations and projects relating to diversity, equity, and inclusion in STEM, including outreach to young students, creating internship and scholarship opportunities for women, founding networking groups, organizing conferences, and is currently leading a department dedicated to women in STEM. She focuses her efforts on women, people of color, and those identifying as LGBTQ+.

=== Awards, selected ===
- The Optical Society Diversity & Inclusion Advocacy Recognition "For an unwavering dedication to promoting diversity and inclusion throughout the global optics and photonics community."
- Fellow, Australian Institute of Physics
- Senior member, OSA
- Senior member, IEEE Photonics Society
- Distinguished Service Award 2020, IEEE Photonics Society, "For exceptional contributions to the Photonics Society as a champion of Diversity and Inclusion initiatives."
- Excellence in Teaching, City, University of London
- OSA Ambassador, 2016

=== Academic service, selected ===
- Associate vice president of diversity, IEEE Photonics Society
- Chair and board member, Membership Engagement and Development Council, OSA
- Associate editor, IEEE Photonics Journal
- Section editor, Journal of the European Optical Society
- Organizer, Women in Engineering Symposium, 2019
- Founder, GWN (LGBTQ+ Women's Networking) Multicultural group, 2009

=== Publications, selected ===
- Recent Trends in Computational Photonics, Springer (2017)
- Finite Element Time Domain Methods for Photonics, Springer (2017)
- "Hut-like pillar array Si solar cells," Solar Energy (2016)
- "Golden spiral photonic crystal fiber: polarization and dispersion properties," Optics Letters (2008)
- "New method for nonparaxial beam propagation," Journal of the Optical Society of America A (2004)

== Personal life ==
Agrawal is a lesbian and has founded and worked with a number of organizations to support LGBTQ+ students in STEM. She maintains a personal blog about science, policy, equality and diversity, and teaching.
