= Sharif D Rangnekar =

Indian activist

- Occupations: Author, communications consultant, former journalist, human rights activist
- Notable work: Straight to Normal: My Life as a Gay Man

Sharif D Rangnekar is an Indian author, communications consultant, former journalist and human rights activist. He authored the memoir Straight to Normal: My Life as a Gay Man (2019) and the nonfiction book Queersapien (2022). Rangnekar served as chief executive officer and chairman of Integral PR. Rangnekar also founded Rainbow Lit Fest – Queer & Inclusive, a New Delhi-based queer literature festival.

== Career ==
Rangnekar worked as a correspondent for The Economic Times and The Pioneer before joining Integral PR, where he served as chief executive officer and later chairman. He left Integral PR in 2017. After leaving Integral PR, he worked as a communications and workplace inclusion consultant.

He served as president of the Public Relations Consultants Association of India from 2010 to 2015. In 2013, he was named PR Professional of the Year at the India PR & Corporate Communications Awards.

== Writing ==
Rangnekar's memoir Straight to Normal: My Life as a Gay Man was published by Rupa Publications in 2019. The book recounts his experiences growing up and living as a gay man in India. Dhrubo Jyoti of Hindustan Times described it as both a personal memoir and a chronicle of part of India's queer rights movement, while criticizing its brief treatment of some significant events and people. Writing in The Wire, Saleem Kidwai described the book as candid and accessible. The memoir was subsequently the subject of academic studies examining gay identity, coming out, queer spaces and mobility.

His second book, Queersapien was published by Rupa Publications in 2022. It examines queer identity, self-acceptance, Family relationships, Gender norms and social attitudes towards LGBTQ people in India. In a review for The Wire, Deepti Priya Mehrotra discussed the book's treatment of self-discovery, freedom and solidarity across social differences. The tribune reviewed the book the context of social acceptance and discrimination, while The New Indian Express discussed its exploration of identity, relationships and family acceptance.

== LGBTQ advocacy ==
Rangnekar came out as gay in 1999. Much of his later public work has been related to LGBTQ rights and culture. He has also worked as a singer-songwriter. Rangnekar founded the Delhi-based band Friends of Linger. In 2013, he wrote and performed vocals on Head Held High, a song addressing gay identity and acceptance. In 2016, the band released Miss You, written by Rangnekar, with a music video depicting a relationship between two men. After the Central Board of Film Certification sought a cut to a scene showing the two men together in bed, the band appealed to the Film Certification Appellate Tribunal, which allowed the video to be released uncut.

In 2019, Rangnekar established the Rainbow Lit Fest, a New Delhi-based queer literature festival. In 2023, he founded the Rainbow Awards for Literature & Journalism.

Rangnekar filed a petition in the Supreme Court of India in 2024, challenging blood-donor guidelines that permanently excluded transgender people and men who have sex with men from donating blood.The court subsequently issued notices to the Union government, the National AIDS Control Organisation and the National Blood Transfusion Council.
