= Ashok Row Kavi =

Indian journalist and LGBT rights activist

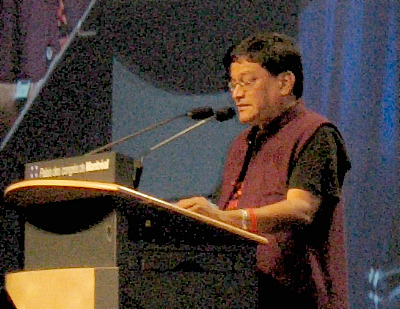
- Row Kavi in 2006
- Born: 1 June 1947 (age 79); Bombay, British India (now Mumbai, India)
- Occupations: Writer, LGBTQ activist
- Writing career
- Period: 20th century

Ashok Row Kavi (born 1 June 1947) is an Indian journalist and LGBTQ rights activist.

== Life ==
He was born in Bombay (now Mumbai) on 1 June 1947, to parents originally from South India. He graduated with honours in chemistry from the University of Bombay. Later, he dropped out of engineering college. Due to his early difficulty in dealing with his homosexuality, he enrolled as a Hindu monk in the Ramakrishna Mission and studied theology. Encouraged by a senior monk, he left the monastery to freely explore and express his homosexuality. He has also studied at the International Institute for Journalism.

== Career ==
In a journalism career spanning 18 years, he worked in various newspapers and magazines, including India's largest circulated newspaper Malayala Manorama (as Western India Bureau-Chief), Sunday Mail and The Daily. For six years he was also senior reporter covering Science and Technology in The Indian Express group of newspapers. His career as a journalist began in 1974 with The Indian Express and was the chief reporter with The Free Press Journal from 1984 to 1989.

In 1971, he started Debonair, with friend Anthony Van Braband and later in 1990, he founded Bombay Dost, India's first gay magazine. He was a representative at the International AIDS Conference in Amsterdam and served as chairman of the Second International Congress on AIDS.

Although he retired from journalism in 1990, he has worked at providing a formal platform for homosexuals to become actively involved in public life and institutions through media, advocacy, co-operation and community-building. Row Kavi was the first person to openly talk about homosexuality and gay rights in India. His first coming out story appeared in Savvy magazine in 1986. His mother, Shobha Row Kavi, also gave an interview to the same magazine; it was the first time that a mother spoke about her son's homosexuality to the Indian media.

== Activism ==
At the present, he is founder-chairperson of the Humsafar Trust, an LGBT rights and health services NGO, which also agitates for the legal emancipation of homosexuality in India. The trust's work comprises community work, outreach into the gay and MSM groups, advocacy on gender and sexuality issues concerning sexual minorities and research into sexuality and gender issues. Besides running several intervention programmes (funded by national and international organisations and private donors) for HIV/AIDS and sexually transmitted infections in Mumbai and Goa, Row Kavi and the trust have been lobbying with policy making bodies as well as supporting similar upcoming groups across the country.

In 1998, Row Kavi received a fellowship to design model questionnaires in the MSM sector at the Center for AIDS Prevention Studies (CAPS), University of California, San Francisco. Row Kavi has been a participant in various international and national fora, including the ICAAPs and the International HIV/AIDS Conferences, where he has made at least five oral presentations. As head of Humsafar, he has also organised the first 'Looking into the Next Millennium' conference of 32 MSM NGOs in Mumbai in May 2001 and co-organized the first ILGA-Asia conference in Mumbai in October 2002.

Row Kavi has been a regular contributor to newspapers, magazines and journals around the world, on homosexuality, gay rights and issues around HIV/AIDS. He is an active supporter of organisations like Gay Bombay, an LGBT social organisation in Mumbai.

Row Kavi is also NGO representative, Executive Committee, Mumbai District AIDS Control Society (MDACS); member, Technical Resource Group, Targeted Interventions, National AIDS Control Organisation (NACO); visiting faculty at Mumbai's Tata Institute of Social Sciences, the department of Clinical Psychology of the University of Mumbai, Nirmala Niketan, and the International Institute of Population Studies.

Row Kavi has been listed among India's Seven Most Influential Gay & Lesbian individuals by Pink Pages magazine.

In September 2017, The Times of India listed Kavi as one of the 11 Human Rights Activists Whose Life Mission Is To Provide Others with a Dignified Life.

He is also known for his support for the ruling Hindu nationalist Bharatiya Janata Party (BJP) and India's present Prime Minister Narendra Modi.

== Controversy ==
In 1995 on the Nikki Tonight show hosted by Nikki Bedi, Row Kavi related a story about how he had, in his youth, had a letter published in a magazine in which he described Mahatma Gandhi as a "bastard bania". The STAR TV show was widely criticised and considered irresponsible for broadcasting the story and it resulted in the cancellation of the show. Nikki Bedi and Row Kavi would soon make a public apology as well.
