= Bindumadhav Khire =

Indian activist and writer

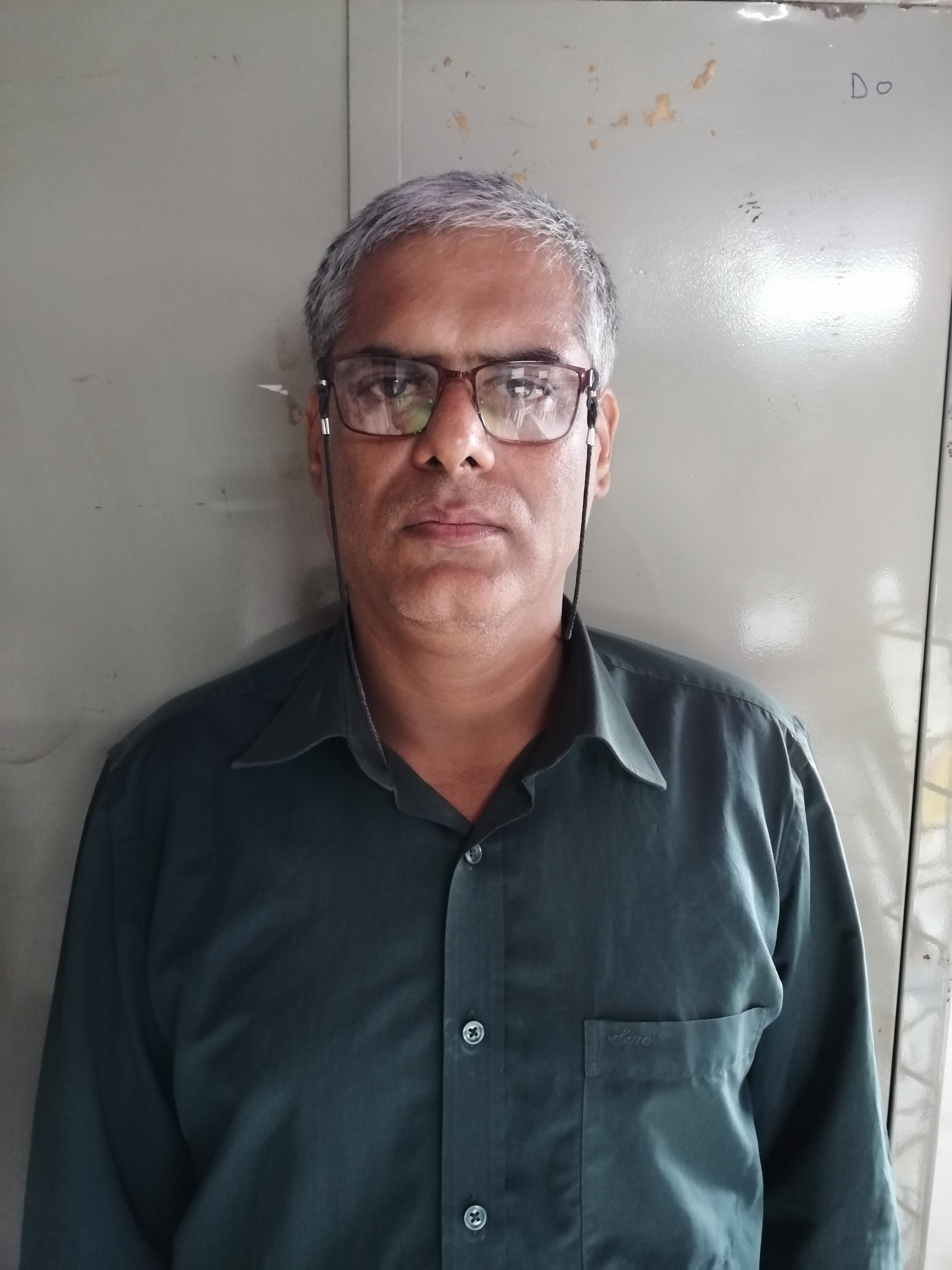
- Born: Pune, Maharashtra, India
- Other names: Bindu
- Occupations: Social worker writer dramatist
- Awards: Full list

Bindumadhav Khire is an LGBTQ+ rights activist from Pune, Maharashtra, India. He runs Samapathik Trust, an NGO which works on LGBTQ+ issues in Pune district. He founded Samapathik Trust in 2002 to cater the men having sex with men (MSM) community in Pune city. He has also written on the issues on sexuality in fictional and non-fictional forms including edited anthologies, plays, short-stories, and informative booklets.

== Personal life ==
Khire left his career as a US-based IT professional to work with the LGBT community in India, returning to his hometown Pune in 2000. Getting associated with activities of San Francisco based Indian gay magazine Trikone helped Bindumadhav to accept himself as gay man. Being Indian and being in the events organized by local queer community in the San Francisco and was always at the core of his stay in the US; this process culminated in him coming out to his parents and coming back to India and work with LGBT community in India.

== Activism ==
=== Samapathik Trust ===
With the assistance of Ashok Rao Kavi and Humsafar Trust, Bindumadhav Khire started Samapathik Trust in Pune in 2002. Since then Samapathik Trust has taken up several initiatives to reach, intervene, and mobilize the LGBT community in Pune city.

- HIV/AIDS, Helpline – Bindumadhav started a telephonic helpline service for MSM community in 2008,
- Drop in Center – For community meetings, informal gatherings the DIC was operational till July 2015 and it was closed because of shortage of funds.
- Periodical HIV testing Camps –
- Beauty Parlor/Training center – Beauty parlor and training center was started with the name of Purple Lotus Beauty Salon and Training Academy specially to cater needs of transgender community in Pune city, who ever otherwise denied services in other beauty parlors meant for women. Though this activity did not last long and it was shut down in next few months because of considering response from community and other technical reasons.

Bindumadhav Khire has dissolved Samapathik Trust and now works through their new non profit organization Bindu Queer Rights Foundation. He provides support to LGBTIQ community through various activities.

=== Pune Pride Parade ===
Bindumadhav started Pune Pride March in 2011, Pune Pride started with 100 community members participating in the first march and till 2018 it has risen to 800 participants.

=== Advait Queer Film Festival ===
With the belief that films are good medium of education Bindumadhav started film festival first Pune in 2014 After the first year of festival it was forced wait till the enough funds were gathered to host it. In 2017 December Pune had its second film festival In 2018 October the third film festival was organized, funds crunch remains big issue for film festival.

=== Muknayak – LGBT Literature Festival ===
To create a platform for emerging writers from LGBT community and Muknayak LGBT literature festival was started by Bindumadhav. Muknayak the name of the festival is inspired from Babasaheb Ambedkar's newspaper Muknayak. In December 2018, the first Marathi LGBT literature festival was organized at Pune. Many gays, lesbians, trans-persons who have been writing poems, plays in print/press and even self-publishing platforms participated in the festival and presented their writings. Festival also had sessions by experts on self-publishing platforms.

=== Queer Katta – Informal support group meetings ===
Considering constraints of formal structures like DIC's, counseling centers and similar, Bindumadhav started informal meetings, where anyone from LGBT community or non-community can come and meet Bindumadhav and others attending the same meeting. Such meetings are conducted once in a month, with no agenda than casual chit chat, in gardens/college canteens/public places where anyone can come and join.

== Controversies ==
=== Pune Pride 2017 ===
In 2017, Pune Pride March became the site for many questions, When organizer of Pune Pride Bindumadhav Khire declared that participants are supposed to wear decent cloths. Few participants actually boycotted Pride to show opposition to Bindumadhav Khire. But on the pride day around 800 participants came from all over India showing support and solidarity.

== Writings ==
=== Edited books ===
- Manachiye Gunti (Marathi) /Beautiful People (English) – A compilation of stories of parents of LGBT people
- Saptaranga (Marathi) – A compilation of stories of third gender and transgender people
- Antaranga (Marathi) – An anthology of autobiographies by Marathi gays and lesbians from Maharashtra

=== Fiction ===
- Partner (Marathi/ Hindi)

=== Informative booklets/books ===
- Manavi Langikakata : Ek Olakh (Marathi) (Introduction to Human Sexuality)
- Indradhanu: Samalaingikateche Vividh Ranga (Marathi) (Different Colors of Homosexuality)
- Intersex – Ek Prathamik olakh (Marathi) (Basic Introduction to Intersex)

=== Plays ===
- Jaswanda (Marathi)
- Purushottam (Marathi)
- Fredy (Marathi)
