= Shobhna S. Kumar =

Shobhana S.Kumar
- Occupations: Publisher, Producer
- Known for: Queer-INK.com
- Notable work: Out! Stories from the New Queer India
- Website: www.queer-ink.com

Shobhna S. Kumar, an Indian female entrepreneur, established Queer Ink, India’s first online bookstore for the queer community. What started as an online bookstore has now evolved into an organisation that publishes works by queer authors, offers writing mentorship and publication guidance to queer authors, creates documentaries about queer lives and conducts events by and for the queer community.

== Early life ==
Shobhna Kumar was born and brought up in Fiji. When she was 18, she along with her family left for Australia and spent several years in Sydney before moving to India. Shobhna studied in Sydney and later in the US. She then got in touch with her partner (who was in India) online and decided to move to India. Kumar moved to India and has been living with her partner in Mumbai ever since.

== Career and activism ==
After moving to India, Shobhna worked for multiple NGOs across states. She has extensively worked in the area of HIV/AIDS awareness and prevention at the grassroots level and brought about changes in the NGO policy. Kumar started India's first online LGBTQIA+ bookstore, Queer-ink.com in 2010. after seeing the dearth of books available on homosexuality back then. She along with her partner invested an amount of Rs 10 lakh, which happen to be their retirement funds, in the bookstore.

In addition to setting up the first queer online book store, she has many other accomplishments to her name. Shobhna is also the founder of UMANG group for LBT (lesbian, bisexual, trans) women, which is now managed by Humsafar Trust. Shobhna happens to be India's first queer publisher as well. She is a pioneering publisher & producer (films, theatre and events) of exclusively LGBTHQIA+ Indian lives and stories. To address the issues faced by queer people in India, Shobhna has produced multiple short films on same sex love and acceptance - Any Other Day is one of them.

Teaming up with author and writing coach Minal Hajratwala, she published a collection of short stories Out! Stories from The New Queer India, all from Queer India. It had 30 contributing writers, some of whom are Amit Mirchandani, Sandip Roy and Kama Spice. It was stocked in New Arrivals section at Crossword Bookstores along with independent stores.

== Queer-ink ==
After the Supreme Court of India recriminalized same-sex relationships in 2013, Queer-ink needed to rework on their communication strategy. As a result of this, she launched a queer festival QFest, Digital Library have been launched. The store showcases a lot of Indian Queer stories, including, You Are Not Alone by Arun Mirchandani and a number of magazines like Bombay Dost and Swikriti Patrika.

== InQueerable Happenings ==
A platform for queer content and a drama production house, which is an idea of Shobhna S Kumar and Vikram Phukan, a theatre commentator and curator of Short+Salty. It is the probably the only theatre group focused exclusively on queer theatre.

On September 6, 2019, the group staged the collection of short plays at The Five Senses Theatre, is a studio theatre in Lokhandwala, Mumbai.

Some of their plays:

- Two Soldiers, written and directed by Prajesh Kashyap, Dusha Nandu, and Apeksha Vora
- Graduation Day, directed by Lakshvir Singh Saran
- Pehli Shaadi, a poem written and performed by Trinetra Tiwari
- Kiss Of The Spiderwoman
- Best Man’s Kiss
- Rapunzel 2.0
