= Living Smile Vidya =

Indian actress

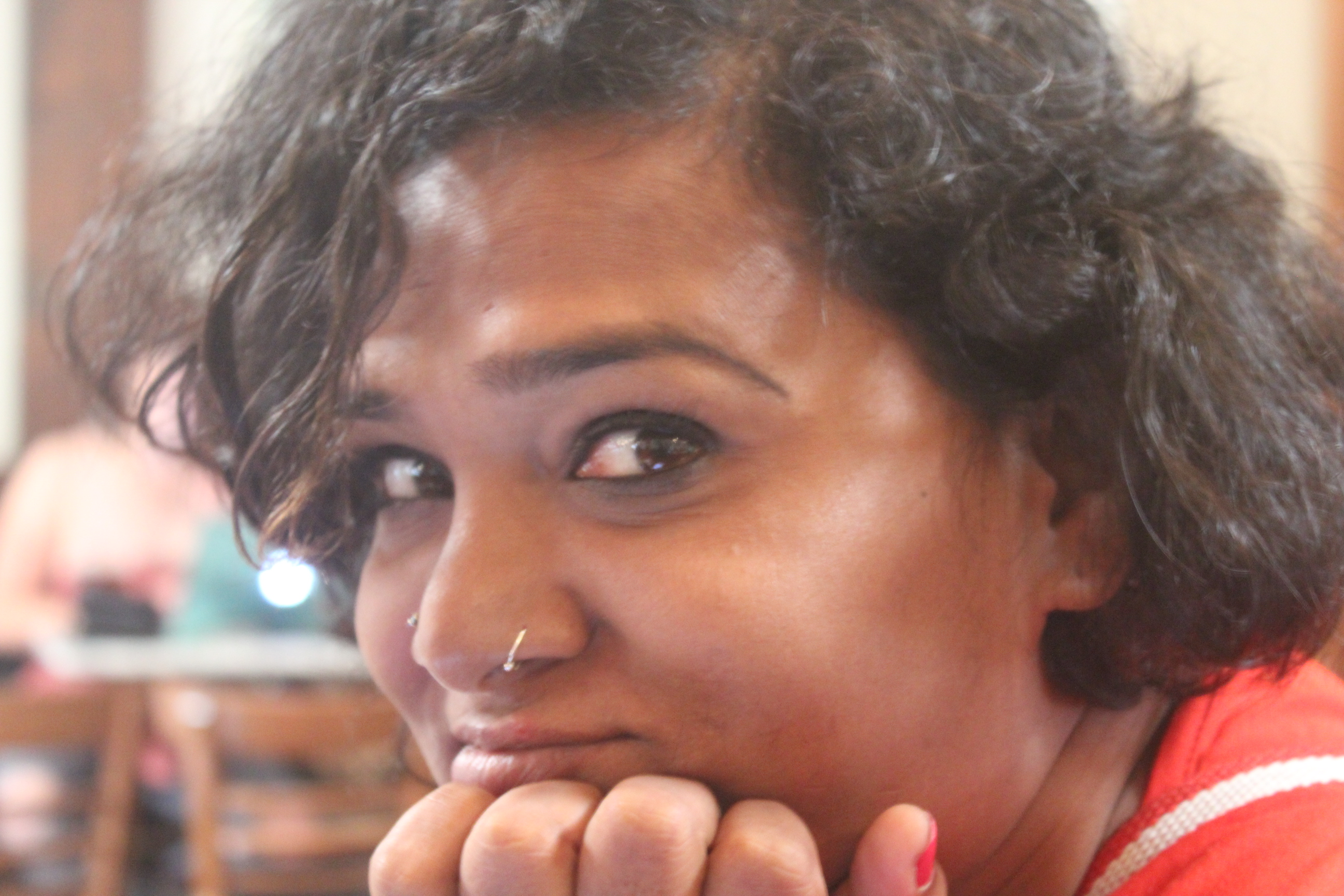
- Born: March 25, 1982 (age 44)
- Occupations: Actor, writer, transgender rights activist

Living Smile Vidya, or Smiley, is an Indian actress, assistant director, writer, and trans and Dalit rights activist from Chennai. Her autobiography 'I am Vidya' has been translated into seven languages and made into a feature film that won several National Film Awards. She also made history as the first trans woman in India to have her chosen gender identity reflected in her passport.

== Early life ==
Living Smile Vidya, also known as Smiley, described her family as belonging to the Arunthatiyar caste in Trichy. She migrated to Puni and Chennai after she came out as a trans woman. Her father was an Office Assistant and her mother worked as a scavenger, in addition to domestic work. As a child, she described herself as being "a woman in my heart…even as I was being given male privilege.…I was mistaken to be male and couldn’t yet articulate that I was a girl and so I was educated much more than my sisters." In a 2013 interview, Smiley traces the roots of her public art and activism to her realization that "since all women get oppressed under patriarchy, and trans women and dalit women through the combined might of patriarchy with casteism and transphobia, I might as well have a loud mouth and be assertive than take everything silently – to be a strong but silent woman was not enough."

Smiley holds a master's degree from Tanjavur Tamil University in applied linguistics. In a 2014 interview, she said "while doing my post-graduation at university, I spent most of the time in the Theater Department rather than my Linguistics Department…So I was able to do a couple of plays."

After her masters in Applied Linguistics, she was doing what the most of Indian trans women do, begging. After gender-reassignment surgery, she settled in Tamil Nadu, where she began her career working for two years at a rural bank in Madurai, and got involved with theatre.

== Film and theatre ==
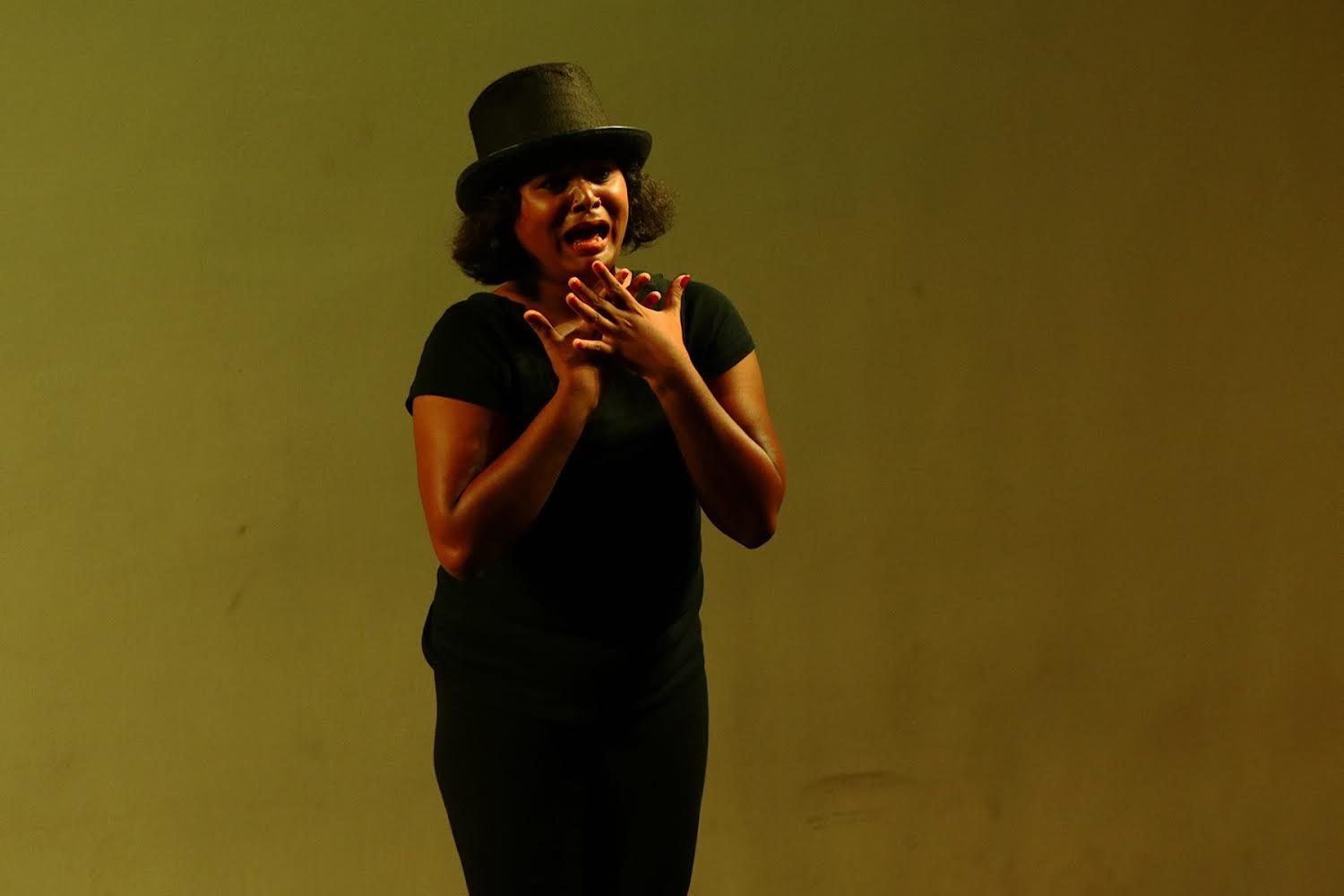
Living Smile Vidya in a theatrical performance

Smiley has been described as the first full-time trans theater actress in India, participating in over fifty performances with at least 20 theater directors. According to Orinam, Smiley is known for her acting in Kattiyakkaari production Molagapodi.

She has acted in several short films, including Kandal Pookkal and 500 & 5, and in documentary films Aghrinaigal and Butterfly. She acted in Leena Manimekalai's 2017 film Is it Too Much to Ask?, where she plays a trans woman seeking housing in Chennai, but facing discrimination; the film, a mix of fiction and documentary, was based in part on her own extensive experiences with housing discrimination.

In addition to theater, Smiley has worked as a clown, and described her experience as a dancer as being an important part of her journey as a trans woman.

She has also worked as an Assistant Director in Tamil and Malayalam movies.

In 2013, Smiley was awarded a scholarship by the Charles Wallace India Trust to pursue theatre in the UK. She spent six months of theater training at the London International School of Performing Arts.

In 2014, Smiley co-founded the Panmai theatre troupe in Tamil Nadu, along with fellow trans activists Angel Glady and Gee Imaan Semmalar, inspired in part by cultural groups she saw in London. Panmai's productions included Colour of Trans 2.0, which has been performed in India and the United States.

In 2019, she performed her piece, Scars, in Switzerland. The piece touches on the mental and physical scars that associated with having her male body blend into her feminine identity.

== Veteren Dalit Trans Activist ==
Smiley raised her first voice for Transgenders horizontal reservation in Job and Education in India. Also raising her voice Trans stereotypes in Tamil and Indian Films and continue fighting for hiring Trans actors for Trans roles in Films. The Dalit History Month project describes Living Smile Vidya as "the first trans person [in India] to have her chosen gender identity reflected in her passport." This first generation Graduate who fought all the odds to prove her existence in India has burned her hard-earned identity cards in protest against the Trans Bill 2026.

Smiley has engaged in activism rooted in Dalit and trans communities, and has been critical of savarna transgender people who claim to represent her entire community.

She was one the Transwomen who approached the Madras High Court asking for a 3% reservation under a new category. “When parents see a transgender child," she said, "they think of begging or sex work as their future. How will they accept their own children if these are their only options?” In a 2013 interview, she said "We need reservation on the basis of gender, not caste. But it has to be more complex. But I definitely do not want to be OBC. And you will understand why as a Dalit, I do not want to come under the OBC category of all things! Puttings transgenders under a oppressed caste category erases the caste privileges that savarna transgenders have. It is better for us to have caste and gender based reservation so that Dalit women and Dalit transgenders get representation. Otherwise reservation will only benefit savarna transgenders and dalit men."

Smiley reports receiving death threats for her activism around caste starting in 2014 or 2015; her subsequent application for asylum in Switzerland was suspended since 2018.

== Autobiography and Films ==
Smiley's autobiography I Am Vidya was written in Tamil, and translated into seven languages, including English, Malayalam, Marathi, and Kannada. She was the subject of the award-winning Kannada film Naanu Avanalla...Avalu, based on her autobiography of the same name.. Makes her the first Trans woman whose life was made into a film and won two Indian National Awards and Several Karnataka State Awards, including Best original story award for her. She is also first Transwoman to win a film award in India.

2012, ‘Ayynoorum Ayynthum (500&5)‘ an Independent film by Stanzin Raghu, Accessible Horizon Films

2017 Appeared as herself in ‘Naked Wheels’,Documentary film by Rajesh James.

2017, ‘Pombala pombalaya irukkanum’ an Independent Film by Stanzin Raghu, Accessible Horizon Films.

2017, Appeared as herself in ‘Is it too much to Ask?’, Documentary film by Leena Manimekalai.

2018, ‘Ashvamithra’ an Independent Film by Stanzin Raghu, Accessible Horizon Films.

2020, Appeared as herself in Don’t look into the Sun, Documentary film, by Raphael Reichert.

2024, Appreared as herself in Die Hearing, Documentary film by Lisa Gerig, Best documentary film award winner of Swiss film price 2023 and Zürich Film price 2023.
