= Joyita Mondal =

Indian social worker

Joyita Mondal is a social worker from West Bengal, India, and the first Bengali trans woman to be a member of a judicial panel of a civil court.

== Early life ==
Mondal comes from a traditional Hindu household and suffered a lot of discrimination in her childhood because of her gender identity. She dropped out of school after class 10th. After, she slept at bus stands and begged on streets.

She moved to Islampur in Uttar Dinajpur district and worked for the upliftment of the transgender community. Simultaneously, she also completed her studies through correspondence and got a degree in law. In 2010, she was the first trans person from her district to get a voter ID.

Mondal also started her own organisation, Dinajpur Notun Alo (Dinajpur New Light), that is currently reaching out to and helping thousands of people in her district.

== Career ==
Mondal is a member of the transgender community of West Bengal and works for the welfare and development of the community. In 2015, Mondal was involved with others in setting up a home for older people who were HIV positive and forming patients' welfare committees.

On 8 July 2017, 29-year old Mondal became the first transgender judge of a Lok Adalat from West Bengal, India. She attended office as judge of a Lok Adalat at Islampur in the North Dinajpur, where some of her first cases involved the recovery of loans made by banks.
