= Mitrachi Goshta =

- Original language: Marathi
- Written by: Vijay Tendulkar

Premiere
- Date: 1981

Mitrachi Goshta (Marathi: मित्राची गोष्ट, sometimes translated as A Friend's Story) is a Marathi-language play by Indian playwright Vijay Tendulkar. It was first performed in 1981, and has been described as one of the first modern Indian plays dealing with lesbian themes or same-sex attraction.

== Plot ==
In a 2015 article about the play, Poorva Joshi from the Hindustan Times described it as being "Set in the pre-Independence era, in a college campus in Poona (now Pune), it had a seemingly conventional boy-meets-girl build-up. In reality, it was a love triangle between Bapu, a shy boy battling a strong sense of inadequacy, Mitra, an independent girl with a secret that eventually resulted in her downfall, and Nama, Mitra’s graceful-yet-treacherous love interest."

According to a 2016 article in Mid-Day, "Mitrachi Goshta told the story of a love triangle between three students in a Pune college. Bapu, Mitra, Nama's story is, however, not the regular triangle. When Bapu's wish of getting to know Mitra comes true, he becomes party to her inner struggles with her sexuality, and eventually gets drawn into a game of vacillating sexual politics between her and Nama, the girl she desires."

According to Mint, "In this love tangle, Bapu is smitten by the seemingly self-possessed Mitra (Phatak), who is sexually attracted to Pethe’s Nama, who reciprocates her feelings. Same-sex desire was little understood in those times and a conflicted Mitra soon launches into a self-destructive trajectory. While she is unwilling to sacrifice her innate desires, she inevitably ends up as an archetypal victim."

== Publication ==
The original Marathi language edition of the play was published in 1982 by Nilkanth Prakashan.

An English language translation by Gowri Ramnarayan was published in 2001 by Oxford University Press.

== Premiere ==
The original Marathi play was premiered on 15 August 1981 at the Gadkari Rangayatan in Thane, Maharashtra, starring Rohini Hattangadi.

== Impact ==
Frontline described Mitrachi Goshta as "the first Indian play on same-sex relations, which also faced empty halls when premiered with Rohini Hattangady in the lead. She recalled, 'In those days, nobody talked, let alone or put up a play on the subject.'"

According to the Hindustan Times, "Tendulkar weaved in complex characters and intricate plotlines that broke the taboo on lesbian identities three decades ago. A play ahead of its time, it was intense, progressive and highly controversial."

Mid-Day described the play as a "controversial classic" that "raised many eyebrows."

A Mint review of a 2001 production says "The part of an unrepentant lesbian was certainly path-breaking in 1981."
