= Gautam Bhan =

Urbanist

Gautam Bhan is an urbanist, writer and activist affiliated with the Indian Institute for Human Settlements (IIHS). His works focuses on urban inequality, social protection, housing, community mobilisation, decent work, and urban and planning theory. He is a frequent columnist and is actively involved in the sexuality rights movements in India.

== Education ==
Bhan completed his undergraduate degree in Political Economy and Development Studies from Amherst College in 2002, followed by a master's degree in Urban Sociology from the University of Chicago in 2006 and PhD in City and Regional Planning from the University of California, Berkeley in 2012.

== Career ==
Bhan is currently Associate Dean of the IIHS School of Human Development, and is also Associate Professor at IIHS (Institution Deemed to be) University. He is also the co-founder of New Text, a print and electronic publishing house committed to expanding equitable, open and affordable access to knowledge and books. He appeared on TED Talks India in 2017, where he spoke about his "bold plan to house 100 million people".

He writes frequently for various magazines and dailies including The Caravan, Hindustan Times, India Today, Tehelka, The Indian Express and The Times of India. He is an active proponent of LGBT rights in India and one of the petitioners in the legal battle to decriminalize homosexuality in India.

== Honours and awards ==
Bhan was previously Fellow, Social Science Research Council, 2009–10 and Berkeley Fellow, 2007–12; and has received the Award for Distinguished Academic Achievement, College of Environmental Design, UC Berkeley, 2012.

== Selected publications ==
- Bhan, G., Keith, M., Parnell, S., & Pieterse, E. (2025). Cities rethought: A new urban disposition. Polity.
- Surie, A., Goswami, A., Arakali, A., Revi, A., Ravindranath, D., Bhan, G., Anand, G., Balakrishnan, K., Kapoor, N., Sami, N., Vasanth, P., Anand, S., Smitha, M. B., Viswanath, S., Baberwal, S., Sudeshna Mitra, S., Batikar, T., & John, V. (2023). Towards a new urban practice: The Urban Fellows Programme 2016–2022. Indian Institute for Human Settlements.
- Bhan, G., Srinivas, S., and Watson, V. (2017) Routledge companion to planning in the Global South. London: Routledge.
- Deb, A., & Bhan, G. (2016). Indispensable yet inaccessible: The paradoxes of adequate housing in urban India. In India social development report 2016. New Delhi: Oxford University Press.
- Bhan, G. (2016). In the public’s interest: evictions, citizenship and inequality in contemporary Delhi. New Delhi: Orient Blackswan.
- Revi, A., Jana, A., Malladi, T., Anand, G., Anand, S., Bazaz, A., . . . Shah, S. (2015). Urban India 2015: Evidence. Bangalore: Indian Institute for Human Settlements.
- Bhan, G., & Jana, A. (2015). Reading spatial inequality in urban India. Economic & Political Weekly, 50(22), 49–54.
- Bhan, G., Goswami, A., & Revi, A. (2014). The intent to reside: spatial illegality, inclusive planning and urban social security. In O. Mathur (Ed.), Inclusive urban planning: state of the urban poor report 2013 (pp. 83–94). New Delhi: Oxford University Press.
- Bhan, G. (2014). Continuity amidst change: learning from Rajiv awas yojana. Yojana, 58, 64 – 67.
- Bhan, G. (2014). Moving from giving back’ to engagement. Journal of Research Practice, 10(2), 1–4.
- Bhan, G. (2014). The impoverishment of poverty: reflections on urban citizenship and inequality in contemporary Delhi. Environment and Urbanization, 26(2), 547–560.
- Bhan, G. (2014). The real lives of urban fantasies. Environment & Urbanization, 26(1), 232–235.
- Bhan, G., Narain, A. (2005) Because I Have a Voice. Delhi: Yoda Press.
