= Rose Venkatesan =

Indian talk show host

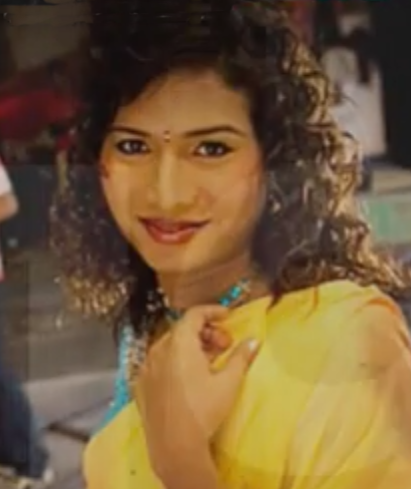
- Rose on PinkSixty News
- Born: Chennai, India
- Occupations: Talk Show Host, Radio Jockey, Politician
- Years active: 2008–present

Rose Venkatesan is the first Indian talk show host based in Chennai, Tamil Nadu. She is a trans woman, and has been active in many fields like television and radio.

== Early life and education ==
Rose Venkatesan became aware of her gender identity when she was around five years old and felt uncomfortable with being forced to behave as a boy. She started dressing as a woman when she was in her early twenties.

She finished her high school in the year 1996 from Sri Ramakrishna Mission Higher Secondary School (South), Chennai. She studied mechanical engineering at Sathyabama Engineering College (currently Sathyabama University), Chennai between 1997 and 2001. She travelled to the United States to study Biomedical Engineering at Louisiana Tech University between 2001 and worked as a website designer before returning home to Chennai in 2003.

== Personal life ==
It took Rose Venkatesan years to tell her family how she felt, but when she did, they were devastated. When she decided to transition in 2004, her family used violent means to prevent her and even looked at marriage as a possible solution. She was hit by her brother and was locked up in a room. She even attempted to commit suicide. She was thrown out of her house and she worked for a while in a call centre. She currently lives with her family, who only conditionally accept her. Her mother has broken off all ties and has moved out of their house.

In 2010, she made the decision to get sexual reassignment surgery done in Thailand, something that received significant media attention.

== Career ==
=== Television ===
Rose Venkatesan made her television debut in the talk show Ippadikku Rose (English: Yours truly, Rose) which aired on Vijay TV. The show dealt with current affairs touching a wide variety of social issues including traditions, taboos, rebels and culture and had an audience of tens of millions. The show began in February 2008 and ended in April 2009, with Venkatesan shifting to Kalaignar TV for the show Idhu Rose Neram (English: This is Rose Time) in July 2009. In the show, she played a US-born Tamil character who studies Indology and invites people to her home for discussions on issues such as obesity.

=== Radio ===
Having ended her television career in 2010, she became a Radio Jockey at BIG FM 92.7 in June 2011, airing the afternoon show Rosudan Pesungal (English: Talk with Rose) on Weekdays.

=== Politics ===
In March 2012, she stated that she planned to form a political party, the Sexual Liberation Party of India. She said that the party's goals would be promoting sexual freedom and the rights of women and LGBT people. Some of the initial proposals would be to legalize prostitution and brothels, change adultery laws and lower the minimum age for sex to 14–15 years.

=== Film ===
She will be making her directorial debut with Cricket Scandal, which also features her in the lead with Kishan as the male lead. --> She is also making plans for films featuring transgender characters and is looking for a production partner for her reality television series about gender reassignment surgery.

=== Activism ===
Rose Venkatesan has been a vocal supporter of LGBTQ rights, women's rights and free sexual expression. Over the years, she has built her career around openly raising societal issues through the medium of radio and politics as well. Currently involved in organic farming on the outskirts of Chennai and working as a freelance in the corporate sector, Rose Venkatesan trains employees to get their American accent right and teaches them English grammar and speech.

According to her, there is more maturity in the corporate world, but it is not without its problems pertaining to discrimination based not only on sexuality but also gender.

== Controversies ==
Although afraid of the backlash, Rose Venkatesan said that she will continue to be in media until she exposes their hypocrisy.
