= Pink Pages =

Indian LGBT magazine

- Monsoon 2012 cover
- Editor: Udayan dhar
- Categories: Lifestyle
- Frequency: Quarterly
- Circulation: 6,000 (2009 est.)
- Publication history: 2009–2017
- Country: India
- Language: English

Pink Pages was an Indian LGBT magazine that published online and print issues from 2009 to 2017.

== Background ==
Pink Pages was founded by in 2009, with Udayan Dhar as the editor in chief. The magazine was distributed online free of cost and had readers and contributors from across India, making it an LGBT magazine with a national focus. Pink Pages, combined politics, activism and interviews with celebrities, lifestyle stories and readers’ own personal accounts.

The first issue was released within days of the historic Delhi High Court judgement decriminalizing homosexuality in India.

Pink Pages was denied permission to print by the Registrar of Newspapers in India in October 2010, which was widely viewed as a homophobic act by the Government body. The first print issue was eventually released in 2016.
