= Saleem Kidwai =

Indian historian and gay rights activist (1951–2021)

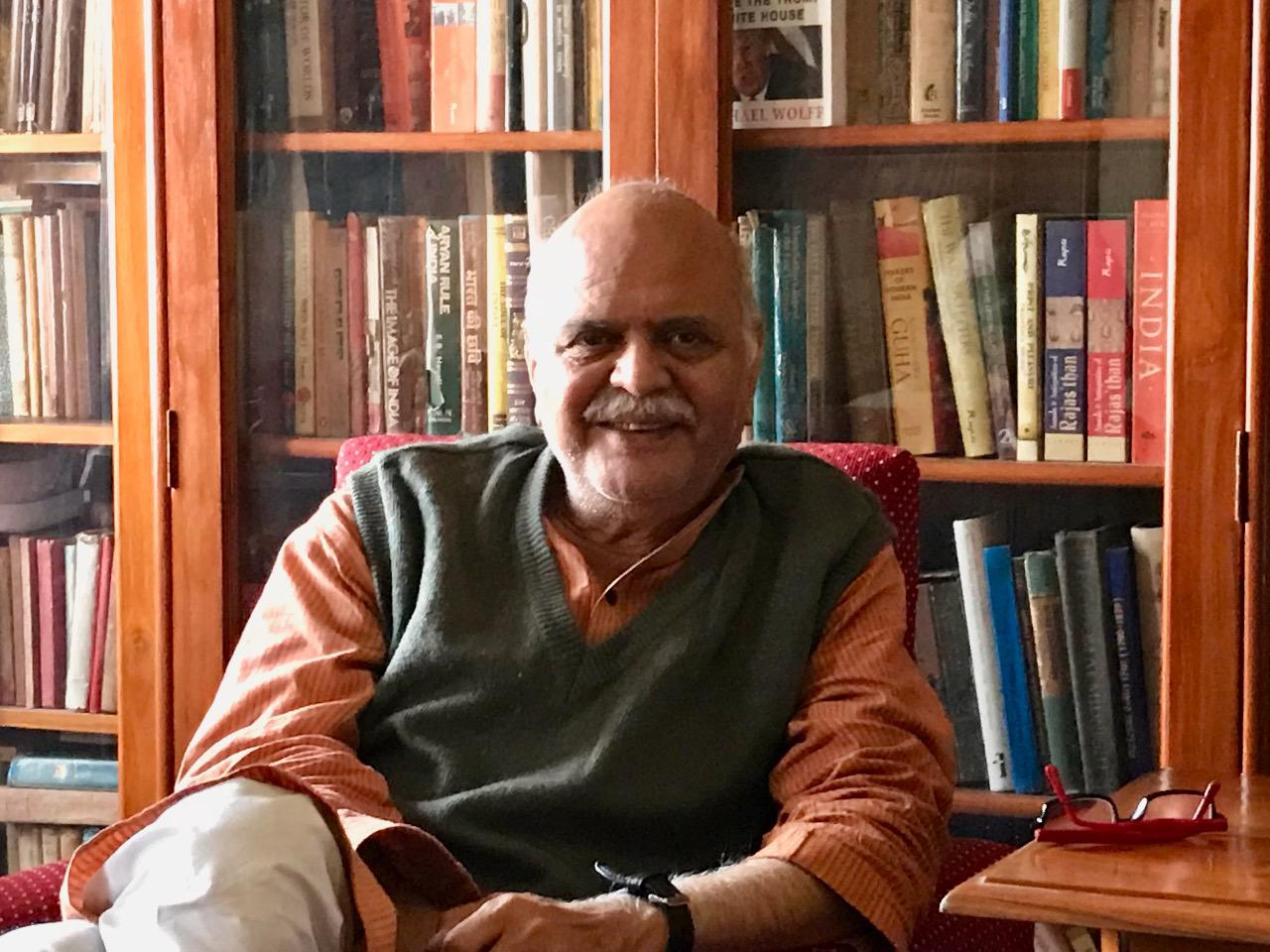

Saleem Kidwai (7 August 1951 – 30 August 2021) was a medieval historian, gay rights activist, and translator. Kidwai was a professor of history at Ramjas College, University of Delhi until 1993 and thereafter an independent scholar.

== Early life and education ==
Saleem Kidwai was born 7 August 1951, in Lucknow, Uttar Pradesh, India. His family and relatives owned extensive amounts of land in the area. He knew he was gay when he was in his late teens. When he was 17 years old, he moved to the city of Delhi, in part because he knew that living in a small town would significantly constrain his ability to live openly as a gay man.

He enrolled in and received his bachelor's and master's degrees in history from Delhi University, and he began teaching there in 1973.

In 1976, he enrolled in a doctoral program at McGill University in Montréal, Québec, Canada. In October 1977, Montréal police raided two gay bars, Truxx and Le Mystique, in a military-style raid. They arrested 146 men in what was the largest mass arrest since the domestic terrorist kidnappings of the October Crisis in 1970. Kidwai was among those arrested, forced to submit to venereal disease tests, and charged with criminal activity. Deeply traumatized by the incident, he quit his doctoral program and returned to teaching at Delhi University. (Although the province of Quebec amended its Human Rights Charter to include homosexuality as a protected class, the criminal charges against Kidwai were not dropped until 1982.)

== Academic career ==
He was one of the first academics to speak publicly as a member of the LGBT community and published with Ruth Vanita as co-editor of Same-Sex Love in India: Readings from Literature and History, a pioneering work documenting and exploring the indigenous roots of same-sex desire in South Asia.

His other academic areas of interest included cultural history, the history of sexuality and the history of the courtesan singers (tawaifs).

Kidwai translated singer Malika Pukhraj's autobiography, "Song Sung True." His other translations include The Mirror of Wonders, a collection of short stories of Syed Rafiq Hussain, the first Urdu writer to write in the ‘animal stories’ genre. He was the only translator to have translated the novels of the well-known Urdu writer Quratulain Hyder who transcreated her own novels. Kidwai has translated two remaining novels of hers – 'Chandni Begum' and 'Safina-e-Gham-e-Dil' as "Ship of Sorrows". He was working on her last remaining untranslated novel 'Gardish-e-Rang-e-Chaman' as well as a well-known Urdu history of Lucknow by Mirza Jafar Hussain before his death.

== Death ==
Saleem Kidwai suffered cardiac arrest on 30 August 2021, and died in a hospital in Lucknow.

== Recognition and legacy ==
Kidwai was posthumously given the 2025 Lifetime Achievement Award from the Rainbow Awards.

== Publications ==
- Ruth, Vanita; Kidwai, Saleem, eds. (2000). Same-Sex love in India: Readings from Literature and History. London: Palgrave Macmillan. ISBN 0-312-22169-X.
- Kidwai, Saleem (2003). Song Sung True. New Delhi: Kali for Women.
- Kidwai, Saleem (2012). The Mirror of Wonders. New Delhi: Yoda Press.
- Kidwai, Saleem (2017). Chandni Begum. New Delhi: Women Unlimited.
- Kidwai, Saleem (2019). Ship of Sorrows. New Delhi: Women Unlimited.
