= Bombay Dost =

Indian LGBTQ magazine

Bombay Dost was India's first registered magazine for the Lesbian Gay Bisexual Transgender (LGBTQ) community. It was founded by Ashok Row Kavi in the year 1990. It is a magazine that supports and addresses issues faced by the queer community. The aim of the magazine is to mobilize the gay community and articulate the rights of gay people. Since 1994, the not-for-profit organisation Humsafar Trust began publishing the newsletter. The periodicals were shut down in the year 2002, and republished since the year 2009, and it continues to be published today.

== History and development ==
Bombay Dost highlights the issues of sexuality and HIV/AIDS. Initially, it publishes articles focusing on gay men and MSM (men-having-sex-with-men) community to navigate the problems faced by gay people in society. Bombay dost is an important milestone in the history of the queer gay movement in India. Ashok Row Kavi and Suhail Abbasi, were the two gay men who brought out the first issue of the newsletter. The first issue was a 16 pages article which was a form of an instruction manual for the gay men informing them about how to manage their lives, how to live safely, how to gain confidence and how to lead their lives. Due to funding and logistical problems the magazine was suspended in the year 2002. The editors did not intend to close down the magazine but the financial problems did not let the magazine exist more. When it relaunched in the year 2009 the laws of India were much more hospitable and generous to the gay community.

== Founder: Ashok Row Kavi ==
Ashok Row Kavi (born 1947) is an activist and journalist in India. He began his career as a journalist in the year 1974 and retired as a journalist in the year 1990. Then as an activist for LGBTQ community in society, Ashok founded a gay magazine Bombay Dost featuring the issues of the transgender community. He was the first person to talk about homosexuality publicly. He is the founder-chairperson of Humsafar Trust and fighting for the gay rights in society to build respect for LGBTQ community in minds of people. His dream was to remove the cloth of invisibility that surrounded the LGBTQ community. Row Kavi received Shivananda Khan HERO Award in November 2017 for improving the lives of transgender people and all those people affected by HIV across the country.

== Publications and content ==
The major competition at the time of its relaunch was widespread communication through the use of the digital platform. It is mostly available in form of hard copy only due to the belief that there are thousands of people who do not have access to digital media which deprives them of knowledge if available online only. Until it shut down, the magazine was available in two languages Hindi and English but after its relaunch it was restricted to the English language. It was originally distributed as an annually or bi-annually magazine. Until 2002, the newsletter was originally available through roadside vendors wrapped in brown paper. But after its relaunch the magazine was also available in various bookstores as to cover a larger group of people. Apart from Indian people, Row Kavi has also received letters from people of Tajikistan, Afghanistan, Dubai and Iran. In earlier years of the magazine, editors received around 3,000 letters weekly through 'Khush Khat' or 'Happy letters’ a platform where readers exchange their correspondence. There were also demand of magazine from various Asian countries like Pakistan, Central Asian Republic and some more.

== Publisher: Humsafar Trust ==
The Humsafar Trust was founded as a non-profit organization in 1990 by the editors of Bombay Dost. It is India's oldest gay organization working with the Government of India. Ashok Row Kavi is the Chairperson and Vivek Anand is the CEO along with Suhail Abbasi and Sridhar Rangayan as the co-founder of the organization. Started just as a Bombay-based organization, Humsafar Trust today works in around 29 cities and promotes different community initiatives in the country. Its major objective is to provide health care and support services, to work towards the sexual and gender issues and human rights of the LGBTQ community. It offered face-to-face counselling services to the community to know the root causes of such stereotypes.

== Issues covered ==
Bombay Dost had covered various mainstream issues to strengthen the rights of the LGBTQ community.

During the starting phase of magazine, it consists of all the major issues of world mainly focusing the local news because of the absence of digital platform in those days. There were many columns like Papa Passion (about health issues), Khush Khat and Pushtak (views of people about the issues) and entertainment section.

The 1991 issues highlight an account of disturbance in the Asian Lesbian Conference, 1991 held in Bangkok where Lesbians from every part of the world participated. Highlights were also about Indian-American woman Urvashi Vaid selected to lead National Gay and Lesbian Task Force (NGLTF)

In 1995 the magazine highlighted the bromance of actors Akshay Kumar and Saif Ali Khan in their movie Main Khiladi Tu Anari.

The 1996 magazine had an introduction about Poison Pudi, a self-styled diva and story about Bombay guys who discovered that they are gay after their marriage as they got to know about their attraction towards men.

The edition of 1991 focuses on the introduction of the Internet and its impact on the magazine with articles on the gay movement of India.

The 2002 issue had an eight-page article describing the police raid on Naz Foundation in the year 2001 and about the petition filed by the Naz foundation against Section 377. The magazine also raised many current issues and problems faced by the transgender community.

After the revival of Bombay Dost on 16 April 2009, the new imprint on the cover page was focusing on being Bolder than ever. The magazine highlighted the conflicts focused on religion and sexuality with talks of Ghalib Shiraz Dhalla, Syed Ali Arif and Gwyneth Mawlong on the issue. It was in total 56 pages which dealt with and features all the gay issues both in India and abroad.

== Events ==
In the year 2015, Bombay Dost and Humsafar Trust initiated a project named 'LIKHO'. The objective of the project was to inspire and train the aspiring new generation of LGBTQ community to put forth their views on issues related to homosexuality and medical problems like HIV.

Eventually, after the project, Bombay Dost and Humsafar Trust organized 'Likho' awards in association with Blued, world largest social networking gay app. The motive is to recognize and encourage the people for their contribution in writing and media on issues concerning homosexuality and the transgender community. It was conducted first in the year 2016 and after that every year it is being conducted by the organization.

== Works ==
After its relaunch, things had changed from how it was before. Just before the shut down of the magazine, Naz Foundation, a non-profit organization appealed Delhi High Court against Section 377 of Indian Penal Code. People then eventually started to support gay relationships. It was not that the entire population was in favor but things were on a much more positive high compared to before. After its relaunch people were willing to pick up the magazine, put it in their studios, stores, and libraries, showering their support towards the community. According to Row Kavi one of the aims of Bombay Dost after its 25th issue was to trains interns or deserving youth in journalism. The matter also became more contemporary focusing on the policies and politics that will create a bigger change. One thing that also worked in the favor of Bombay Dost after its relaunch was to have celebrities on the cover page.

In the year 2010, for the first time, Bombay Dost featured the identifiable queer people by using their own names as the cover page of magazine opposing the celebrity support for the cause.

On 20th anniversary issue of the magazine, Bombay Dost features Imran Khan on the cover page. Imran becomes the first top Bollywood actor to feature on any of the cover of the gay magazine.

In 2013 Bombay Dost featured Master Chef Vikas Khanna on the cover page by putting emphasis on young faces of the country to bring a wave of change by their views.

In 2015 on the 25th anniversary for the first time, Bombay Dost featured a woman actress Kalki Koechlin on the cover page of the newsletter.

In the year 2016, the periodical featured Manoj Bajpayee on its cover page addressing his performance as a gay professor in Aligarh, a biographical drama.

Celina Jaitley, former Miss India and an Indian Bollywood actress supported and came at the relaunch of the magazine in the year 2009 with her outspoken campaign and support for the gay rights in India.

== Challenges ==
The biggest challenge for the magazine was the distribution mechanism. In initial years, Kavi and other members were able to find a couple of street-side vendors to sell their magazine. The vendors used to put the stuff behind some other titles and providing the magazine only when buyers express their desire for the magazine. The vendors then go away and come back with a magazine in a brown paper envelope.Eventually as the time passed some of the stores started to keep the magazine and situation changes. The challenge was that a single magazine was going through a number of hands. It was because if a person purchases a magazine (which was also very rare), it was read by hundreds of people as people use to left it in public places and offices. It was resulting in losses as demand was very less as compared to supply. Therefore, slowly and gradually Bombay Dost was sold in various large bookstores and also available online. People also had started to purchase the magazine with due respect and honor for the community.
