= Sridhar Rangayan =

Indian filmmaker (born 1962)

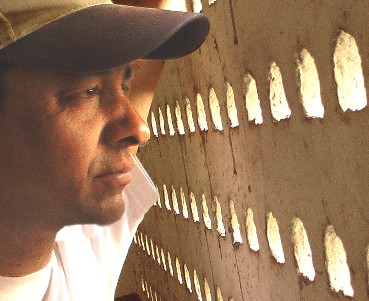
- Born: 2 April 1962 (age 64); Mandya, Karnataka, India
- Other names: Sridhar Rangayyan; Sridhar Rangaihn
- Occupations: Film director, screenwriter, film producer
- Partner: Saagar Gupta
- Parent(s): M. R. Thirunarayan, Yadu Narayan

Sridhar Rangayan (also spelt Sridhar Rangaihn; born 2 April 1962) is an Indian filmmaker who has made films with special focus on queer subjects. His queer films, The Pink Mirror, Yours Emotionally, 68 Pages, Purple Skies, Breaking Free & Evening Shadows have been considered groundbreaking because of their realistic and sympathetic portrayal of the largely closeted Indian gay community. His film The Pink Mirror remains banned in India by the Indian Censor Board because of its homosexual content.

Rangayan was born in Mandya, Karnataka. As a gay activist, he has been one of the front-rank leaders in the LGBT movement in India and has contributed immensely towards the growth of awareness about sexual minorities in India.

He is a Founder Member and Trustee of The Humsafar Trust, the first gay NGO in India, along with Ashok Row Kavi. He served on its board till January 2013. He also designed and edited India's first gay magazine Bombay Dost between 1999 and 2003.

In 2006, he was awarded the South Asian Achievers Award for his contribution to global mainstream media by Triangle Media Group (TMG), UK.

In 2010, he has served on the Jury for the Teddy Awards at the 60th Berlinale (Berlin, Germany), Jury for Matter of Act awards at the Movies That Matter film festival (The Hague, Netherlands) and also as Jury for Outfest, Iris Prize, Mardi Gras and Image+Nation.

He is the founder Festival Director of KASHISH Pride Film Festival that is held in Mumbai, India every year for past 14 years, is first ever queer film festival to be held at a mainstream theater - PVR Cinemas (2010), Cinemax (2011–2013) and Liberty Cinema (2014–2023)

He was elected as Regional Director (region 19) of Interpride which is a network of more than 160 Gay Pride organisations from more than 35 countries in 162 cities, dedicated to LGBT Pride parades and other events.

He is also the Festival Director of Flashpoint Human Rights Film Festival that was held in Mumbai, India from 8–10 December 2010 at Alliance française de Bombay and screened 8 documentary films on human rights issues along with panel discussions on several topics like human trafficking and the law, violence against women and religious intolerance.

== Early life and career ==
Sridhar Rangayan is a graduate of National Institute of Technology Karnataka and has a Post-graduate in design from Industrial Design Centre, IIT Bombay, specializing in Visual Communication. Sridhar Rangayan worked with the National Institute for the Hearing Handicapped as Mass Media Officer and then for a while as a textile designer for an export firm, designing tapestries and carpets.

In 1994 he attended a short course in film appreciation at the FTII, Pune. Thereafter he apprenticed with Indian directors like Sai Paranjpye on the film Papeeha and TV serial Hum Panchi Ek Chal Ke and Dev Benegal on his feature English, August. He wrote the screenplay and dialogues for Kalpana Lajmi's serial The Awakening (Doordarshan) and was the associate director for the serial Dawn (Star Plus). Both these were produced by Bhupen Hazarika, the Assamese music director and singer.

From 1999 to 2002, Rangayan scripted and directed several television series like Rishtey and Gubbare for (Zee TV), Kagaar for (Sahara TV) and Krisshna Arjun, Kahani Jurrm Ki for (Star Plus). His serial Pyar Ki Kashti Mein for Star One (2004) was the first Indian serial to be entirely shot on a cuiseliner (SuperStar Virgo) and also in Singapore and Malaysia.

In 2001 he founded his production company Solaris Pictures along with his partner Saagar Gupta, a writer and art director. The company is perhaps the only production company in India to specialize in production of gay themed films. For his company, Rangayan scripted, produced and directed 'India's first film on drag queens' Gulabi Aaina which came 9 years after India's first gay film, Riyad Vinci Wadia's Bomgay. Gulabi Aaina has screened at more than 70 international film festivals and won several awards. This film, which is a sensitive portrayal of the marginalised community of Indian transsexuals, has become part of libraries and academic course work in US universities.

His first feature Yeh Hai Chakkad Bakkad Bumbe Bo (The Sensational Six) is produced by the Children's Film Society of India CFSI. It is a children's film. It won the Bronze Remi Award at WorldFest, Houston and has been screened at several children's film festivals. The film is written by playwright and screenwriter Vijay Tendulkar based on a story by writer and MP Shakuntala Paranjpye.

Rangayan's next film Yours Emotionally, a co-production with a UK production company Wise Thoughts portrayed the angst of a gay British Asian falling in love with a bisexual Indian man in a small town. The film has screened at several international film festivals including Tasveer – Seattle South Asian Film Festival and Prague Bollywood Film Festival.

His next film 68 Pages about stigma and discrimination faced by HIV positive people has been funded by DFID, UK and co-produced by his company Solaris Pictures along with The Humsafar Trust. This film which premiered at the International Film Festival of Kerala (IFFK) in December 2007 is about a HIV/AIDS counselor and how she instills hope and a will to live, among five HIV positive people from marginalised communities. A transsexual bar dancer, a gay couple, a sex worker and a drug user form the five narratives in this film. HIVOS has granted a fund to support screening of the film throughout India as part of its advocacy initiative. The National AIDS Control Organisation (NACO) has made the film mandatory for all counselor training programmes throughout India as part of their NACP III program.

His next two documentaries on LGBT issues have been groundbreaking - 'Purple Skies - Voices of Indian lesbian, bisexual & transmen', produced by PSBT Public Service Broadcasting Trust is the first film on lesbians to be telecast on Doordarshan; and 'Breaking Free', a film about Sec 377 and Indian LGBT community, produced by Solaris Pictures won the National Award for Best editing (non feature) at the 63rd National Film Awards 2016 for editors Pravin Angre and Sridhar Rangayan. The film also won the Barbara Gittings International Human Rights Award at qFLIX Philadelphia film festival, USA.

He has directed and produced the feature film Evening Shadows which had its world premiere at Mardi Gras Film Festival, Sydney in February 2018. Evening Shadows is a story about a gay son coming out to his mother in a small town in South India and how his family reacts to it. The film has won 27 awards and has screened at more than 80 international film festivals. The film stars Mona Ambegaonkar, Ananth Mahadevan and newcomers Devansh Doshi and Arpit Chaudhary.

He was named to the jury for the Teddy Award for LGBT films at the 2010 Berlin International Film Festival (Berlinale). He has also served on the jury of prestigious film festivals Mardi Gras Film Festival, Movies That Matter Festival, The Netherlands, Iris Prize, UK, Image+Nation LGBT film festival, Montreal, Quebec, Canada and Outfest, USA.

Rangayan was also chosen as one of the Grand Marshals at the 2016 Montreal pride parade, where he led the pride parade along with Canadian prime minister Justin Trudeau.

Apart from filmmaking, Rangayan is also actively involved with human rights issues and the disability sector. He has made short film on cancer intervention and rehabilitation as well as several films on hearing impairment.

== Filmography ==
=== Director ===
- 1999 Rishtey (TV series)
- 1999 Gubbarey (TV series)
- 1999 Krishna Arjun (TV series)
- 1999 Kagaar (TV series)
- 2003 Yeh Hai Chakkad Bakkad Bumbe Bo (feature)
- 2004 Pyaar Ki Kashti Mein (TV series)
- 2006 The Pink Mirror (short film)
- 2007 Yours Emotionally (feature)
- 2007 68 Pages (feature)
- 2008 Bridges of Hope (documentary short)
- 2011 Project Bolo (video films)
- 2014 Purple Skies (documentary feature)
- 2014 Aa Muskuraa (educational film)
- 2015 Breaking Free (documentary feature)
- 2018 Evening Shadows (feature)

== Awards ==
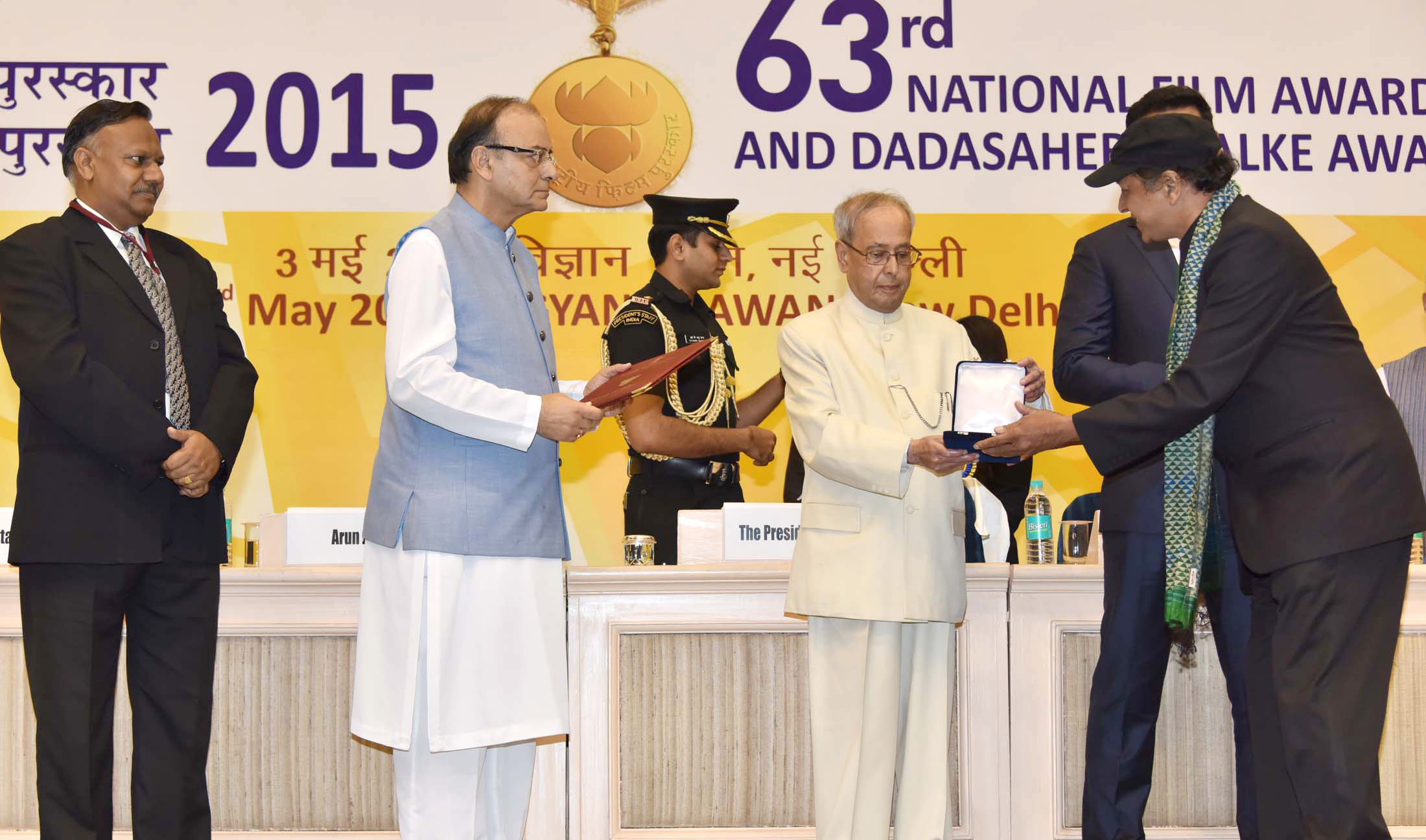
Rangayan getting the Rajat Kamal award for Best Editing “Breaking Free”, at the 63rd National Film Awards Function by The President, Shri Pranab Mukherjee

Rangayan and his films have won several awards, both Indian and international. They are as follows:

- Rajat Kamal National Award - Best Editor in the category Best Editing (non-fiction) at 63rd National Film Awards 2016, India (for film 'Breaking Free')
- Best Narrative Feature at Chicago South Asian Film Festival (for film 'Evening Shadows')
- Best International Feature audience award at Out On Film, Atlanta (for film 'Evening Shadows')
- Jury Award for Best Men's Feature at North Carolina Gay & Lesbian Film Festival (for film 'Evening Shadows')
- Interfaith Discernment Award at Kansas International Film Festival (for film 'Evening Shadows')
- 'Celebration of Courage' award at OUT HERE NOW: Kansas City LGBT Film Festival (for film 'Evening Shadows')
- 'Free To Be Me' award at Roze Filmdagen, Amsterdam (for film 'Evening Shadows')
- Barbara Gittings Human Rights Award at qFLIX Philadelphia 2016, USA (for film 'Breaking Free')
- Best Film on Social Issues Award at Ahmadabad International Film Festival 2009, India (for film 68 Pages)
- Silver Remi Award at WorldFest 2008, Houston (for film 68 Pages)
- South Asian Achievers Award 2006 by Triangle Media, UK
- Jury Award for Best Film at Fire Island Film Festival 2004, New York City (for "Gulabi Aaina")
- Bronze Remi Award at WorldFest 2004, Houston (for Yeh Hai Chakkad Bakkad Bumbe Bo – CFSI )
- Best Film of the Festival award at Question de Genre film festival 2003, Lille, France (for film "Gulabi Aaina")
- RAPA award for Best Comedy Episode, 1999 (for "Piya Ka Ghar" – Gubbare, Zee TV)
- RAPA award for Best Telefilm, 2000 (for "Khamoshiyaan" – Rishtey, Zee TV)
