= Saagar Gupta =

Indian screenwriter, lyricist and film producer

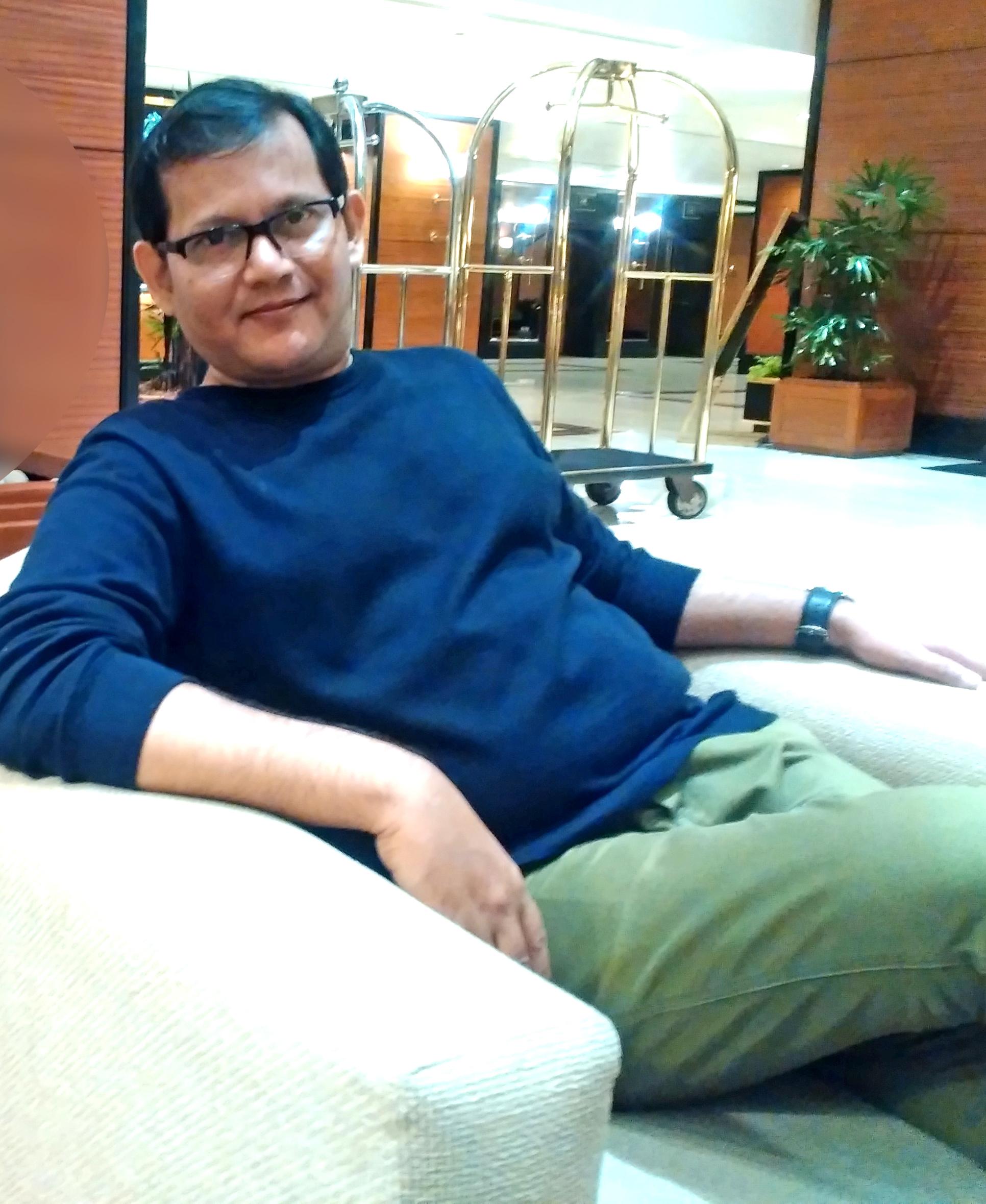
- Born: 4 March 1969 (age 56); Meerut, UP, India
- Occupations: Screenwriter, lyricist, film producer
- Parent(s): Budhprakash Gupta, Shail Gupta

Saagar Gupta (born 4 March 1969) is an Indian screenwriter, lyricist and film producer.

He has written screenplay and dialogues for independent films like The Pink Mirror and Evening Shadows as well as dialogues for several TV episodes of Rishtey, Gubbare, Kagaar and TV shows like Jassi Jaissi Koi Nahin, Left Right Left, Radha Ki Betiyaan among others.

He has written lyrics for the song "Surmaee Shaam" in the film Evening Shadows, composed and sung by Shubha Mudgal. He has also written lyrics for a song in the film 68 Pages, with music by A Band of Boys.

He is a partner in the company Solaris Pictures along with Sridhar Rangayan, and has produced several films like The Pink Mirror, Yours Emotionally, Breaking Free, Evening Shadows.

He is the founder team member of Kashish Mumbai Queer Film Festival and has been the Director of Programming since its inception in 2010.

Saagar Gupta has worked with the Children's Film Society as Junior Festival Officer for two editions of the Golden Elephant International Children Film Festival of India.

== Filmography ==
=== Writer ===
- 1999 Rishtey (TV series)
- 1999 Gubbarey (TV series)
- 1999 Krishna Arjun (TV series)
- 1999 Kagaar (TV series)
- 2004 Pyaar Ki Kashti Mein (TV series)
- 2006 The Pink Mirror (short film)
- 2007 Yours Emotionally (feature)
- 2007 68 Pages (feature)
- 2014 Purple Skies (documentary feature)
- 2014 Aa Muskuraa (educational film)
- 2015 Breaking Free (documentary feature)
- 2018 Evening Shadows (feature)

== Awards ==
Saagar Gupta's films as producer have won several awards, both Indian and international. They are as follows:

- Barbara Gittings Human Rights Award at qFLIX Philadelphia 2016, USA (for film 'Breaking Free')
- Jury Award for Best Film at Fire Island Film Festival 2004, New York City (for "Gulabi Aaina")
- Best Film of the Festival award at Question de Genre film festival 2003, Lille, France (for film "Gulabi Aaina")
- RAPA award for Best Comedy Episode, 1999 (for "Piya Ka Ghar" – Gubbare, Zee TV)
- RAPA award for Best Telefilm, 2000 (for "Khamoshiyaan" – Rishtey, Zee TV)
