= The Pink Mirror =

Gulabi Aaina The Pink Mirror
- Directed by: Sridhar Rangayan
- Written by: Sridhar Rangayan
- Produced by: Saagar Gupta
- Starring: Edwin Fernandes; Ramesh Menon; Deepak Sonavane; Rufy Baqal; Rishi Raj
- Distributed by: Solaris Pictures
- Release date: 14 January 2006
- Running time: 40 minutes
- Country: India
- Language: Hindi

The Pink Mirror, titled Gulabi Aaina in India, is an Indian film drama produced and directed by Sridhar Rangayan. It is said to be the first Indian film to comprehensively focus on Indian transsexuals with the entire story revolving around two transsexuals and a gay teenager's attempts to seduce a man, Samir (Rufy Baqal). The film explores the taboo subject of transsexuals in India which is still much misunderstood and ridiculed.

In 2003, the Central Board of Film Certification banned this film. The censor board cited that the film was 'vulgar and offensive'. The filmmaker appealed twice again unsuccessfully. The film still remains banned in India, but was screened at numerous festivals all over the world and won awards. The critics have applauded it for its sensitive and touching portrayal of marginalized communities.

India's foremost gay activist Ashok Row Kavi says in his review, "The wonder is that it was not made before. The reality is that it is here now." India's leading newspaper, The Indian Express, wrote, "This is more than just the 'peeping into the closet' that Rangayan intended. It's almost throwing the doors wide open for the world to look in!"

The film has received tremendous support and critical acclaim from reviewers, festival directors and global audiences. It was screened at more than 70 international film festivals and won a couple of awards. The film is also used as part of university archives and libraries as resource material in academic courses.

== Plot ==
The film centers around two drag performers: Bibbo, a Bollywood fashion designer, and Shabbo, a dancer, who have a strenuous and often volatile relationship with each other. Though they are known to quarrel often, they are always able to reconcile soon after an argument and prove to the other that they care about them.

They both have an attraction to Samir, an aspiring actor whom Bibbo claims is her driver, despite Bibbo not owning a car. The situation is further complicated by Mandy, Shabbo's young Western apprentice, who reveals he is gay and admits to being attracted to Samir. Throughout the escapades and comedic antics that occur during the scuffle to win Samir's heart, Bibbo learns Shabbo's secret that he is HIV-positive, and is not above revealing his secret to Samir or possibly even the entire city.

== Cast ==
Actor	Character	Role
Ramesh Menon	Bibbo	A Bollywood fashion designer: loud, raucous and vitriolic. She loves campy drag humor and thinks she is a master at seducing men. When she sees Shabbo and Mandy stealing her current boyfriend Samir, she gets very upset and nasty.
Edwin Fernandes	Shabbo	A dancer: soft, sensuous, and equally malicious. When she comes to Bibbo's house, she falls for Samir and makes attempts to seduce him. During a fight, Bibbo learns that Shabbo is HIV positive.
Rishi Raj	Mandy	A young pesky teenager just about peeping out of his closet... a western closet – a westernized teenager who says he is 'gay', much to the ire of Bibbo who calls herself 'kothi' (transgender). Mandy falls for Samir, creating a triangle.
Rufy Baqal	Samir	The handsome aspiring actor whom Bibbo claims to be her driver. Upon meeting Samir, Shabbo begins her attempts to seduce Samir, even if it means doing so before Bibbo's eyes.

== Festivals ==
The movie has been shown at many film festivals

- Fire Island Film Festival
- 12th Le Festival Question de Genre – Gay Kitschcamp
- Fire Island Film and Video Festival
- 18th Turin International Gay & Lesbian Film Festival
- Digital Talkies Film Festival
- 6th Pink Apple Gay and Lesbian Film Festival
- San Francisco International Lesbian & Gay Film Festival
- Queer Filmstan
- Austin Gay & Lesbian International Film Festival
- Indianapolis LGBT Film Festival
- Barcelona International Gay & Lesbian Film Festival
- Hamburg International Lesbian & Gay Film Festival
- Cork Film Festival
- Lehigh Valley Queer Film Festival
- Chicago Lesbian & Gay International Film Festival
- Out Takes Dallas Lesbian & Gay Film Festival
- Rhode Island International Film Festival
- Translations – Seattle Transgender Film Festival, USA (May 2009)

== Awards ==
- Jury Award for Best Feature, Fire Island, New York, USA
- Best Film of the Festival, Question de Genre, Lille, France

== Other related films ==
Since The Pink Mirror, its director, Sridhar Rangayan, has made 5 more films dealing with gay and transgender people:

Yours Emotionally (2006) is a film about a passionate love story between a British Asian from UK and a small town Indian youth. The film received good reviews for its bold and groundbreaking narrative. It has been released on DVD by Waterbearer Films.

68 Pages (2007) is a film about the lives of five people who fight all odds to survive. It is about stigma and discrimination faced by HIV+ people – a transsexual bar dancer, a commercial sex worker, a gay couple, a heterosexual ID user and a municipality sweeper. The film derives its name from 68 pages of a counselors diary. This film had its world premiere at the International Film Festival of Kerala (IFFK 2007) in December 2007.

Purple Skies (2014) is a 2014 movie directed by Sridhar Rangayan and produced by Public Service Broadcasting Trust and Solaris Pictures. It documents the opinions of lesbians, bisexuals and trans men in India. It was broadcast on Doordarshan in 2015.

Breaking Free is a 2015 film directed by Sridhar Rangayan and produced by Solaris Pictures. In this documentary, filmmaker and gay activist Sridhar Rangayan embarks on a personal journey to expose the human rights violations faced by the LGBTQ community in India due to a draconian law Section 377 and homophobic social mores of a patriarchal society. The film was selected to be part of the Indian Panorama (non-Fiction) and screened at International Film Festival of India in 2015. It won the Rajat Kamal National Award for Best Editing (Non-Fiction) in 2016 for its editors Pravin Angre and Sridhar Rangayan. It also won the Barbara Gittings Human Rights Award at qFLIX Philadelphia in 2016.

Evening Shadows (2018) is a movie set in South India and Mumbai, 'Evening Shadows' is a tender heartwarming story about a mother-son bond that has to withstand the ravages of time, distance and truths.
