= KASHISH Pride Film Festival =

LGBT film festival held in Mumbai, India

- Location: Mumbai, India
- Founded: 2010; 16 years ago
- Founded by: Sridhar Rangayan, Saagar Gupta
- Language: International
- Website: mumbaiqueerfest.com

The KASHISH Pride Film Festival (earlier known as KASHISH Mumbai International Queer Film Festival, also known as Mumbai International Queer Film Festival and Mumbai Queer Film Festival) is an annual LGBTQ event that has been held in Mumbai, India, since 2010. The film festival screens gay, lesbian, bisexual, transgender and queer films from India and around the world. It is voted as one of the top five LGBT film festivals in the world.

== Background ==
2009 was a historic year for the LGBTQ movement in India. On 2 July 2009, the Delhi High Court court ruling decriminalised homosexual intercourse between consenting adults and judged Section 377 of the Indian Penal Code to be conflicting with the fundamental rights guaranteed by the Constitution of India. This brought a respite to the Indian LGBT community that has been repressed and marginalized. This also led to open celebrations by LGBT persons including pride parades in many of the metros.

This was followed by the relaunch of India's first gay magazine, Bombay Dost. The Indian Election Commission decided to recognize transgender as a separate category. All these activities brought media focus and visibility to the LGBTQ community in India.

KASHISH Pride Film Festival took this movement forward through the medium of films. It made LGBTQ persons, their desires and aspirations visible through films and brought about an international perspective to LGBTQ works. The objective of the festival continues to mainstream the LGBTQ community and project them as 'normal' human beings who have the capacity to love and live with dignity. The festival offers cinema as a means to understand what being queer means today, and how it impacts both the queer community and the society at large.

It was the first Indian LGBTQ film festival to be held in a mainstream theater. It was also the first LGBTQ film festival to obtain a clearance from the Ministry of Information and Broadcasting (India).

== The festival ==
KASHISH Pride Film Festival, 2010 was held between 22 and 25 April 2010, spread across two venues in Mumbai – one in the city and one in the suburbs. The first edition was organized by Solaris Pictures and The Humsafar Trust in association with Bombay Dost. Features, short films, documentaries and experimental films were screened that highlighted gay, lesbian, bisexual and transgender characters and stories. The films explored the diverse realities, complexities, joys and sorrows that make up the global queer experience. They also celebrated, reclaimed, and explained LGBTQ identities while engaging and entertaining audiences. The film festival brought together the audience, the films and their makers to create social change.

In its debut year, founder Festival Director Sridhar Rangayan said he hoped that the film festival would encourage greater visibility of queer cinema and bring it into the mainstream discourse. He has said that the festival showcases the films to both queer and mainstream audiences, in order to make them aware of queer thought, desires and expressions.

The festival boasts of support from Indian film personalities. Shyam Benegal is the Festival Patron. Celina Jaitly was the Festival Ambassador till 2020.

The advisory board of the festival is composed of eminent personalities like Aruna Raje Patil, Dolly Thakore, Meghna Ghai Puri, Renuka Shahane, Roy Wadia, Satya Rai Nagpaul and Viveck Vaswani. In the past years Onir, Jenni Olson (USA), Nandini Sardesai and Shernaz Patel served on the advisory board.

Some of the chief guests and guests of honour at the festival have been Sir Ian McKellen, Deepa Mehta, Sonam Kapoor, Arjun Kapoor, Raveena Tandon, Konkana Sen Sharma, Nawazuddin Siddiqui, Rajkumar Rao, Juhi Chawla, Manisha Koirala, Nandita Das Deepa Mehta, Swara Bhaskar, Divya Dutta, Pratik Gandhi, Vikramaditya Motwane, Guneet Monga, Abhishek Chaubey, Ila Arun, Soni Razdan, Rajit Kapur, Renuka Shahane, Kiran Rao, Sonali Kulkarni, Payal Kapadia, Devashish Makhija, Ranveer Brar, Shalmali, Pooja Bhatt, Anupam Kher, Kunal Kapoor, Sai Paranjpye, Kabir Bedi, Kalpana Lajmi, Zeenat Aman, Moushumi Chatterjee, Onir, Tanuja Chandra, Neeraj Ghaywan, Sanjay Suri, Neelam Kothari, Rajeshwari Sachdeva, Varun Badola, Shweta Kawatra, Varun Grover, Shalmali_Kholgade, Rekha Bhardwaj, Simone Singh, Sona Mohapatra, Anant Mahadevan, Shishir Sharma, Shruti Seth, Dalip Tahil, Shaina NC, Nisa Godrej, Aleque Padamsee, Apurva Asrani, Suchitra Pillai-Malik, Purab Kohli, Adhuna Bhabani, Prince Manvendra Singh Gohil, Laxmi Narayan Tripathi and Sushant Divgikar.

KASHISH since 2010 to 2016 was organized by Solaris Pictures and co-organized by The Humsafar Trust. Since 2017, KASHISH is organized by KASHISH Arts Foundation, in association with Solaris Pictures.

=== Calendar ===
- The 1st edition of the festival was held in April 2010 at PVR Cinemas & Alliance Française de Bombay, and screened 110 films from 25 countries. Its theme was 'See A Different World'.
- The 2nd edition of the festival was held in May 2011 at Cinemax Versova & Alliance Française de Bombay, and screened 124 films from 23 countries. Its theme was 'Bigger, Bolder & Queerer'.
- The 3rd edition of the festival was held in May 2012 at Cinemax Versova & Alliance Française de Bombay, and screened 120 films from 30 countries. Its theme was 'For Everyone'.
- The 4th edition of the festival was held in May 2013 at Cinemax Versova & Alliance Française de Bombay, and screened 132 films from 40 countries. Its theme was 'Towards Change'.
- The 5th edition of the festival was held in May 2014 at Liberty Cinema & Alliance Française de Bombay, and screened 154 films from 31 countries. Its theme was 'Dare To Dream'.
- The 6th edition of the festival was held in May 2015 at Liberty Cinema, Alliance Française de Bombay & Max Mueller Bhavan, and screened 180 films from 44 countries. Its theme was 'Reaching Out, Touching Hearts'.
- The 7th edition of the festival was held in May 2016 at Liberty Cinema, Alliance Française de Bombay & Max Mueller Bhavan, and screened 182 films from 53 countries. Its theme was '7 Shades of Love'.
- The 8th edition of festival was held in May 2017 at Liberty Cinema & Alliance Française de Bombay, and screened 147 films from 45 countries. Its theme was 'Diverse, One'.
- The 9th edition of festival was held in May 2018 at Liberty Carnival Cinemas & Metro INOX, and screened 140 films from 45 countries. Its theme was 'Together, With Pride'.
- The 10th edition of festival was held in June 2019 at Liberty Carnival Cinemas & Metro INOX, and screened 160 films from 43 countries. Its theme was 'Over The Rainbow'.
- The 11th edition of festival was held online in July 2020 and screened 157 films from 42 countries. Its theme was 'Moving Forward, Together'.
- The 12th edition of festival was held online in August/September, 2021 and screened 221 films from 53 countries. Its theme was 'Unlock With Pride'.
- The 13th edition of festival was held as a physical festival from June 1–5, 2022 at Liberty Cinema and Alliance Française de Bombay, and as an online festival from June 3–12, 2022; and screened 184 films from 53 countries. Its theme was 'Flights for Freedom'.
- The 14th edition of festival was held as a physical festival from June 7–11, 2023 at Liberty Cinema and Alliance Française de Bombay, and as an online festival from June 15–26, 2023; and screened 110 films from 41 countries. Its theme was 'Be Fluid, Be You!'.
- The 15th edition of festival was held as a physical festival from May 15–19, 2024 at Liberty Cinema, Alliance Française de Bombay and Cinepolis Andheri; and screened 133 films from 46 countries. Its theme was 'Unfurl Your Pride'.
- The 16th edition of festival was held as a physical festival from June 4 - 8, 2025 at Cinepolis Andheri, Alliance Française de Bombay and St. Andrews Auditorium; and screened 152 films from 48 countries. Its theme was 'Love=Peace'. The online edition was held August 15 - September 15, 2025
- The 17th edition of festival was held as a physical festival from June 3 - 7, 2026 at Liberty Cinema, Alliance Française de Bombay and National Gallery of Modern Art (NGMA); and screened 153 films from 43 countries. Its theme was 'Reflect, Resonate, Rejoice'.

=== Festival Jury ===
KASHISH Pride Film Festival has, in its attempt to mainstream queer visibility, engages a jury panel to judge the award categories. The jury has consisted of actors, directors, critics, theater and media personalities and festival curators from India and abroad.

Year	Category	Jury Members
2010	All Categories	Dolly Thakore, Mahesh Dattani, Meenakshi Shedde, Rajit Kapur, Suhasini Mulay
2011	All Categories	John Badalu (Indonesia), Khalid Mohamed, Sai Paranjpye, Samir Soni, Shernaz Patel
2012	All Categories	Mahabanoo Mody-Kotwal, Mayank Shekhar, Mona Ambegaonkar, Parvin Dabas, Renuka Shahane
2013	All Categories	Aruna Raje Patil, Berwyn Rowlands (UK), Jerry Pinto, Quasar Thakore-Padamsee, Simone Singh
2014	All Categories	Avantika Akerkar, Nitish Bharadwaj, Onir, Pia Benegal, Sarika
2015	All Categories	Aamir Bashir, Anubhav Sinha, Chitra Palekar, Malavika Saangghvi, Meghna Malik
2016	All Categories	Andrea Kuhn (Germany), Kaizaad Kotwal, Manav Gohil, Parvati Balagopalan, Rajeshwari Sachdev
2017
2017	Narrative Jury	Anjum Rajabali, Aseem Chhabra, Jabeen Merchant, Lubna Salim, Vinta Nanda
2017	Student Shorts Jury	Avijit Mukul Kishore, Debashree Mukherjee (USA), Pablo Naranjo-Golborne

Year	Category	Jury Members
2018
2018	Narrative Jury	Jayati Bhatia, Sid Makkar, Tara Deshpande
2018	Documentary Jury	Batul Mukhtiar, Malathi Rao, Ramchandra P.N
2018	Student Shorts Jury	Irene Dhar Malik, Jeroo Mulla, Harish Iyer

Year	Category	Jury Members
2019
2019	Narrative Jury	Kitu Gidwani, Neeraj Ghaywan, Sheeba Chaddha
2019	Documentary Jury	Pankaj Rishi Kumar, Paromita Vohra, Ranjan Das
2019	Student Shorts Jury	Dr. Ivan John, Jyoti Kapoor, Somnath Sen

Year	Category	Jury Members
2020
2020	Narrative Jury	Hansal Mehta, Sandhya Mridul, Sunil Sukthankar
2020	Documentary Jury	Faiza Ahmad Khan, Miriam Chandy Menacherry, Nakul Singh Sawhney
2020	Student Shorts Jury	Rabiya Nazki, Shankhajeet De and Tangella Madhavi
2020	KASHISH QDrishti Film Grant Jury	Anjum Rajabali, Arunaraje Patil, Onir

Year	Category	Jury Members
2021
2021	Narrative Jury	Cary Rajinder Sawhney (UK), Gauri Shinde, Ritesh Batra, Satya Rai Nagpaul, Selvaggia Velo (Italy)
2021	Documentary Jury	Beena Paul, Gargi Sen, Nandan Saxena
2021	Student Shorts Jury	Dr. Anjali Monteiro, Ketki Pandit, Viveck Vaswani
2021	KASHISH QDrishti Film Grant Jury	Renuka Shahane, Robin Bhatt, Urmi Juvekar

Year	Category	Jury Members
2022
2022	Narrative Jury	Hardik Mehta, Leena Yadav, Sameera Iyengar
2022	Documentary Jury	Anjali Panjabi, Priti Chandriani, Ramanuj Dutta
2022	Student Shorts Jury	Anupam Barve, Prathyush Parasuraman, Raga D’Silva
2022	KASHISH QDrishti Film Grant Jury	Alankrita Shrivastava, Apurva Asrani, Chhitra Subramaniam, Nupur Asthana

Year	Category	Jury Members
2023
2023	Narrative Jury	Anup Soni, Jitin Hingorani, Lillete Dubey
2023	Documentary Jury	Aanchal Kapur, Nandan Saxena, Shanti Bhushan Roy
2023	Student Shorts Jury	Atika Chohan, Rucha Pathak, Samarth Mahajan
2023	KASHISH QDrishti Film Grant Jury	Aditi Anand, Cary Sawhney, Kaizaad Kotwal

Year	Category	Jury Members
2024
2024	Narrative Jury	Barun Sobti, Kiran Rao, Sonali Kulkarni
2024	Documentary Jury	Kavita Bahl, Pushpendra Singh, Shilpi Gulati
2024	Student Shorts Jury	Abhijit Majumdar, Gazal Dhaliwal, Shweta Basu Prasad
2024	KASHISH QDrishti Film Grant Jury	Amit Masurkar, Atika Chohan, Joy Sengupta

Year	Category	Jury Members
2025
2025	Narrative Jury	Shishir Sharma, Shruti Seth, Tanuja Chandra
2025	Documentary Jury	Bishakha Datta, Prateek Vats, Shubhra Chatterjee
2025	Student Shorts Jury	Siddharth Menon, Sudhanshu Saria, Svetlana Naudiyal
2025	KASHISH QDrishti Film Grant Jury	Abhishek Chaubey, Guneet Monga Kapoor, Vikramaditya Motwane

Year	Category	Jury Members
2026
2026	Narrative Jury	Parvathy Thiruvothu, Rajshri Deshpande, Shonali Bose
2026	Documentary Jury	Jaydeep Sarkar, Monisha Thyagarajan, Shaunak Sen
2026	Student Shorts Jury	Maanvi Gagroo, Rahul Puri, Shazia Iqbal
2026	KASHISH QDrishti Film Grant Jury	Ashwiny Iyer Tiwari, Ishita Moitra, Nikkhil Advani
2026	Genderation Shorts Jury	Anjali Patil, Shals Mahajan, Sharif Rangnekar

The jury members for the Riyad Wadia Award for Best Emerging Indian Filmmaker has been Roy Wadia and Nargis Wadia all the years. The jury member for the Ismat Chughtai Award for Best Indian Woman Filmmaker has been Ashish Sawhny all the years. The Jury member for the Aditya Nanda Award for Best Film on Queer Mental Health has been Akshay Tyagi since its inception in 2024. Neeraj Churi and Sridhar Rangayan have been a jury member for the KASHISH QDrishti Film Grant all the years.

Wendell Rodricks, celebrity fashion designer, was the judge from 2012 to 2020 of the KASHISH Poster Design Contest that invites designers from around the world to create the look of the festival, which will be used in posters, billboards and other promotional materials. After passing away of Wendell Rodricks, his husband Jerome Marrel was the judge from 2020 till 2023.

== Award winners ==
=== Best Narrative Feature ===
- 2026: The Crowd (Jamaat) - Sahand Kabiri | Iran
- 2025: Odd Fish - Snævar Sölvason | Iceland
- 2024: You Promised Me The Sea - Nadir Moknèche | France
- 2023: Lie With Me - Olivier Peyon | France
- 2022: Naanu Ladies - Shailaja Padindala | India, UK
- 2021: Forgotten Roads - Nicol Ruiz | Chile
- 2020: Music For The Bleeding Hearts - Rafael Gomes | Brazil
- 2019: Jose - Li Cheng | Guatemala
- 2018: Mater - Pablo D’Alo Abba | Argentina
- 2017: Gloria and Grace - Flávio R. Tambellini | Brazil
- 2016: How To Win At Checkers (Every Time) - Josh Kim | Thailand, USA, Indonesia
- 2015: Boys (Jongens) - Mischa Kamp | The Netherlands
- 2014: Tru Love - Kate Johnston and Shauna MacDonald | Canada
- 2013: Morgan - Michael Akers | USA
- 2012: My Last Round (Mi Ultimo Rounde) - Julio Jorquera Arriagada | Chile
- 2011: I Am - Onir | India

=== Unity in Diversity Best Documentary Feature ===
Instituted in the memory of socialist and reformer Shri K.F.Patil.

- 2026: Niñxs - Kani Lapuerta | Mexico, Germany
- 2025: Warm Film - Dragan Jovićević | Serbia
- 2024: Neirud - Fernanda Faya | Brazil
- 2023: Mama Bears - Daresha Kyi | USA
- 2022: LA Queencianera - Pedro Peira | Mexico, USA
- 2021: Canela - Cecilia del Valle | Argentina
- 2020: One Taxi Ride - Mak CK | Mexico
- 2019: Until Porn Do Us Part - Jorge Pelicano | Portugal
- 2018: Boys For Sale - Itako | Japan
- 2017: No Dress Code Required - Cristina Herrera Bórquez | Mexico
- 2016: Pansy - Jean-Baptiste Erreca | France
- 2015: Do I Sound Gay? - David Thorpe | USA
- 2014: Bridegroom - Linda Bloodworth-Thomason | USA
- 2013: Hide and Seek - Saadat Munir | Pakistan, Denmark
- 2012: Let The Butterflies Fly (Chittegalu Haradali) - Gopal Menon | India
- 2011: We Were Here - David Weissman | USA
- 2010: Prodigal Sons - Kimberly Reed | USA

=== Unity in Diversity Best Documentary Short ===
Instituted in the memory of socialist and reformer Shri K.F.Patil.

- 2026: Thanks Babs! - Jen Rainin & Rivkah Beth Medow | USA
- 2025: B and S - Lipika Singh Darai | India
- 2024: Dear Sahithya - Leo Paapam | India
- 2023: What it Means To Be - Lea Luiz de Oliveira | UK
- 2022: Beirut Dreams In Colour - Michael Collins | Lebanon, USA
- 2021: Tracing Utopia - Nick Tyson & Catarina de Sousa | Portugal
- 2020: Breakwater - Cris Lyra | Brazil
- 2019: Laadli - Sudipto Kundu | India
- 2018: Little Potato - Wes Hurley | USA, Russia
- 2017: Naked Wheels - Rajesh James | India
- 2016: Transindia - Meera Darji | India, UK
- 2015: Novena - Anna Rodgers | Ireland
- 2014: Families Are Forever - Vivian Kleiman | USA
- 2013: Two Girls Against The Rain - Sopheak Sao | Cambodia
- 2012: Are We So Different (Aamra Ki Etoi Bhinno) - Lok Prakash | Bangladesh
- 2011: Bullied - Bill Brummel and Geoffrey Sharp | UK
- 2010: XXWHY - Dr.Bharathy Manjula | India

=== Best International Narrative Short ===
- 2026: Never, Never, Never - John Sheedy | UK, Australia
- 2025: Violets (Violetas) - Borja Escribano | Spain
- 2024: Breaking Through - Siham Bel | France
- 2023: An Avocado Pit - Ary Zara | Portugal
- 2022: Warsha - Dania Bdeir | Lebanon
- 2021: Snake - Andrej Volkashin | Macedonia
- 2020: Touchscreen - Arthur Halpern | USA
- 2019: Our Way Back - Moshe Rosenthal | Israel
- 2018: Marguerite - Marianne Farley | Canada
- 2017: Stay - Milka Mircic Martinovic | Germany
- 2016: San Cristóbal - Omar Zuniga Hidalgo | Chile
- 2015: 09:55 - 11:05 Ingrid Ekman Bergsgatan 4b - Cristine Berglund and Sophie Vukovic | Sweden
- 2014: Naked - José Antonio Cortés Amunarriz | Spain
- 2013: Polaroid Girl - April Maxey | USA
- 2012: Through The Window (Me’ever La’chalon) - Chen Shumowitz | Israel
- 2011: Let The World Know About Me - Marianna Giordano | Argentina
- 2010: Steam - Eldar Rapaport | USA

=== Best Indian Narrative Short ===
- 2026: Hills Don't Dance Alone - Shubham Negi | India
- 2025: Jasmine That Blooms In Autumn - Chandradeep Das | India
- 2024: Night Queen - Naireeta Dasgupta | India
- 2023: Shurpankha - Jayesh Apte | India
- 2022: Muhafiz - Pradipta Ray | India
- 2021: Are We There Yet? - Bhanu Babbal & Kashyap Swaroop | India
- 2020: The Song We Sang - Aarti Neharsh | India
- 2019: The Booth - Rohin Ravendran Nair | India
- 2018: Ajay - Vikrant Dhote | India
- 2017: Maacher Jhol (Fish Curry) - Abhishek Verma | India
- 2016: Daarvatha (The Threshold) - Nishant Roy Bombarde | India
- 2015: Sundar - Rohan Kanawade | India and Mudivai Thaedum Muttrupulli (A Full Stop That Searches For Its End) - Vivek Vishwanathan | India
- 2014: Mitraa - Ravi Jadhav | India
- 2013: Urmi - Jehangir Jani | India
- 2012: The jury decided not to award any film in this category.
- 2011: Amen - Judhajit Bagchi and Ranadeep Bhattacharyya | India
- 2010: Lost & Found - Shrenik Jain | India

=== Riyad Wadia Award For Best Emerging Indian Filmmaker ===
Instituted in memory of late filmmaker Riyad Vinci Wadia, who made India’s first gay film BOMgAY, the Riyad Wadia Award for Best Emerging Indian Filmmaker is an attempt by KASHISH to recognize and nurture emerging Indian voices.

- 2026: Inzamam Manju Nizam for Served Cold | India
- 2025: Saikat Mondal for Jalsa – The Name Day | India
- 2024: Bonita Rajpurohit for IYKYK | India
- 2023: Preeti Kanungo and Sourav Yadav for Malwa Khushan | India
- 2022: Nemil Shah for Dal Bhat | India
- 2021: Radhika Prasidhha for Begum Parvathi| India
- 2020: Arun Fulara for Sunday
- 2019: Sugandha Bansal for A Little More Blue
- 2018: Preet for Gray
- 2017: Rajesh James for Naked Wheels and Vishal Srivastava for Selfhood (Wajood)
- 2016: Vikrant Dhote and Srikant Ananthakrishnan for Any Other Day
- 2015: Vaibhav Hatkar for Ek Maaya Ashi Hi (A Love Such As This)
- 2014: Sharon Flynn for I'dentity
- 2013: Manava Naik for Dopehri and Rohan Kanawade for Lonely Walls (Ektya Bhinti)
- 2012: Pradipta Ray for The Night Is Young (Raat Baaki)
- 2011: Shumona Banerjee for The Flower Bud (Kusum)

=== Ismat Chughtai Award For Best Woman Filmmaker of South Asian Origin ===
Instituted in memory of eminent Indian Urdu novelist, short story writer, liberal humanist and filmmaker Ismat Chughtai, the Ismat Chughtai Award For Best Woman Filmmaker of South Asian origin is an attempt by KASHISH to acknowledge and encourage women & trans filmmakers of South Asian origin to tell path-breaking narratives infused with progressive, positive viewpoints.

- 2026: Bhavya Karthikeyan for Tea Powder (Chayapodi)| India
- 2025: Shoi for Project Priyo and Joey Kaushik for The Witch of Vihar Lake | India
- 2024: Naireeta Dasgupta for Night Queen | India
- 2023: Akanksha Sharma for Road Blocked Ahead | India

=== Best Performance in a Lead Role ===
- 2026: Silver Chicón for Ivan & Hadoum | Spain
- 2025: Arna Magnea Danks for Odd Fish | Iceland
- 2024: Samyuktha Vijayan for Blue Sunshine | India
- 2023: Kika Sena for Paloma | Brazil
- 2022: Yu Ishizuka for The Fish With One Sleeve | Japan
- 2021: Maria Eduardo Maia for Advent of Mary| Brazil
- 2020: Benjamin Daimary for Fireflies (Jonaki Porua) | India
- 2019: Felix Maritaud for Sauvage | France
- 2018: Chetan Kanwar in Pashi | India
- 2017: Petrice Jones in Play The Devil | Trinidad & Tobago
- 2016: Ingkarat Damrongsakkul in How To Win At Checkers (Every Time) | Thailand, USA, Indonesia
- 2015: Kristina Hernandez in Stealth | USA
- 2014: Kate Trotter in Tru Love | Canada
- 2013: Crystal Annette in Polaroid Girl | USA

=== Best Screenplay ===
Instituted in the memory of author Dr. Arvind Vaman Kulkarni.

- 2026: Ivan & Hadoum written by Ian De La Rosa | Spain
- 2025: Baby written by Gabriel Domingues And Marcelo Caetano | Brazil
- 2024: The Wake written by Peter Ahlén & Jakob Holtet Stridbæk | Denmark
- 2023: Lie With Me written by Olivier Peyon | France
- 2022: Muhafiz written by Pradipta Ray and Ashutosh Pathak | India
- 2021: The Man With The Answers written by Stelios Kammitsis | Cyprus, Greece, Italy
- 2019: Music For The Bleeding Hearts written by Rafael Gomes | Brazil
- 2019: Jose written by Li Cheng | Guatemala

=== Best Student Short ===
- 2026: Upon Starvation (Upaasmaar) - Saurav Mahind | India
- 2025: Two Travelling Aunties - Christine Seow | Columbia, UK
- 2024: Poisoned Well - Radek Sevcik | Slovakia and MASC4MASC - Felix Augustin Greisinger | Sweden
- 2023: Jouissance - Sadeq Es-haqi | Iran
- 2022: The Third Solar Term - Zhanfei Song | China, UK
- 2021: On A Path - Lihi Lubetkin | Israel
- 2020: The Summer of 12 - Kuan-Ling Kuo | Taiwan
- 2019: Three - Lior Soroka | Israel
- 2018: Celebrate Eileen - Judith Westermann | Germany
- 2017: Still Devout - Melissa Perez | USA

=== Aditya Nanda Award for Best Film on Queer Mental Health ===
Instituted in memory of Aditya Nanda.

- 2026: Not Crazy (No estamos locos) - Lucía Criado Rosas | Spain
- 2025: After All - Chongyan Liu | UK, France, Germany
- 2024: Sifar - Edythe | India

=== Best Genderation Short ===
- 2026: Narmook - Ghazal Zoghiniya | Iran

=== KASHISH QDrishti Film Grant ===
- 2026: Simrat Kaur for Vasso'n Bahr (Out of My Hands) | India
- 2025: Shubam Negi for Make-Up Room | India
- 2024: Joey Kaushik for The Witch of Vihar Lake | India
- 2023: Abu Sohel Khondekar for Mehroon | India
- 2022: Arvind Caulagi for Taps and Preeti Kanungo & Sourav Yadav for Malwa-Kushan | India
- 2021: Bhargav Lahkar for The Caress | India
- 2020: Arun Fulara for My Mother's Girlfriend | India
- 2019: Rohin Raveendran Nair for The Booth and Sudipto Kundu for Laadli
- 2018: Siddharth Chauhan for Pashi | India
- 2017: Debadrita Bose for Clarinets (Shehenaiiya) | India
- 2016: V. Ramanathan for Normalcy | India

The Runners-Up for KASHISH QDrishti Film Grant are:

- 2026: Guntaaj Deep Singh for Daag and Negha Shahin for Anyway, We Loved | India
- 2025: Rayyan Monkey for Us Girls and Varsha Panikar for Operation: Gulzar | India
- 2024: Shubham Negi for Ghadoli and Arnab Nandy for Arrey Ladies Hai | India

=== Special Jury Mention ===
- 2026: Shashi Bhushan for Your Fragrance (Tumhari Khushboo) by Onir | India (in the category Performance in a Lead Role)
- 2026: Shubham Negi for Hills Don't Dance Alone | India (in the category Riyad Wadia Award)
- 2026: The Crack (Fatol) - Sankhajit Biswas | India (in the category Indian Narrative Shorts)
- 2026: Life of Kai - Fox Fisher | UK (in the category Documentary Shorts)
- 2026: No Contest (La Premiére Marche) - Olivier Wright | France (in the category International Narrative Shorts)
- 2026: Delay - Daryl Wang | China, USA (in the category Student Shorts)
- 2026: Sister of Mine - André Vaara | Sweden (in the category Genderation Shorts)
- 2025: Joao Pedro Mariano for Baby | Brazil (in the category Performance in a Lead Role)
- 2025: Snævar Sölvason for Odd Fish | Iceland (in the category Best Screenplay)
- 2025: Ana Berdeja for Sole | Mexico (in the category Best Screenplay)
- 2024: Vipin Sharma for Night Queen | India (in the category Performance in a Lead Role)
- 2024: Bonita Rajpurohit for IYKYK | India (in the category Performance in a Lead Role)
- 2024: Maghreb's Hope - Bassem Ben Brahim | Tunisia (in the category Documentary Short)
- 2024: Give - Kenya Gillespie | USA (in the category Student Short)
- 2024: Bonita Rajpurohit for IYKYK | India (in the category Ismat Chughtai Award)
- 2024: Abu Sohel Khondekar for Mehroon | India (in the category Riyad Wadia Award)
- 2024: Sarthak Chauhan for Chitthi | India (in the category Riyad Wadia Award)
- 2023: Ek Jagah Apni - Ektara Collective | India (in the category Narrative Feature)
- 2023: Law of Love - Barbora Chalupová | Czech Republic (in the category Documentary Feature)
- 2023: Bi The Way - Amir Ovadia Steklov | Israel (in the category Documentary Short)
- 2023: Our Males & Females - Ahmad Alyaseer | Jordan (in the category International Narrative Short)
- 2023: Preeti Kanungo for Malwa Khushan | India (in the category Ismat Chughtai Award for Best Indian Woman Filmmaker)
- 2023: Rahul Roye (Aman) and Ashutosh Shankar (Tara) | India (KASHISH QDrishti Film Grant)
- 2022: Wet Sand - Elene Naveriani | Georgia, Switzerland (in the category Narrative Feature)
- 2022: Coming To You - Gyuri Byun | South Korea (in the category Documentary Feature)
- 2022: Marcel - Gastón Calivari | Argentina (in the category Documentary Short)
- 2022: Dal Bhat - Nemil Shah | India (in the category Indian Narrative Short)
- 2022: Breathe - Harm van der Sanden | Netherlands (in the category International Narrative Short)
- 2022: The Fish With One Sleeve - Tsuyoshi Shôji | Japan (in the category International Narrative Short)
- 2022: Mazel Tov - Eli Zuzovsky | Israel (in the category Student Short)
- 2022: Sagar Minde for Her Canvas | India (in the category Riyad Wadia Award for Best Indian Emerging Filmmaker)
- 2022: Anureet Watta for Kinaara | India (in the category Riyad Wadia Award for Best Indian Emerging Filmmaker)
- 2021: Rebel Dykes - Harri Shanahan & Siân A. Williams | UK (in the category Best Documentary Feature)
- 2021: Nothing But A Human - Swati Jaiswal | India (in the category Best Documentary Short)
- 2021: Keep Punching - Kirnay Bhatt | India (in the category Best Indian Narrative Short)
- 2021: Stray Dogs Come Out At Night - Humza Bangash | Pakistan (in the category Best International Narrative Short)
- 2021: Today - Francis Chillet | France (in the category Best Student Short)
- 2020: March For Dignity - John Eames | UK, Georgia (in the category Best Documentary Feature)
- 2020: My Brother Is A Mermaid - Alfie Dale | UK (in the category Best International Narrative Short)
- 2020: We Are Dancers - Joe Morris | UK (in the category Best International Narrative Short)
- 2020: Neon Hearts - Ana Jakimska | Macedonia, the former Yugoslav Republic of (in the category Best Student Short)
- 2019: Amruta Shubhash in The Booth | India (in the category Best Performance in a Lead Role)
- 2019: Parna Pethe in The Booth | India (in the category Best Performance in a Lead Role)
- 2019: Lior Ashkenazi in Our Way Back | Israel (in the category Best Performance in a Lead Role)
- 2019: Shaadi Ke Kapde - Sonal Giani | India (in the category Riyad Wadia Award for Best Emerging Indian Filmmaker)
- 2019: Rangeen - Shaikh Ayaz | India (in the category Riyad Wadia Award for Best Emerging Indian Filmmaker)
- 2019: Hands & Wings - Sungbin Byun | Republic of Korea (in the category Best Student Short)
- 2019: Prisoner Of Society - Rati Tsiteladze | Georgia (in the category Best Documentary Short)
- 2019: Visibles - Enrique Rey | Spain (in the category Best Documentary Short)
- 2019: Fifth Floor On The Left - Renata Lucic | Croatia (in the category Best Screenplay)
- 2018: Birds Of Paradise - Rahul MM | India (in the category Riyad Wadia Award for Best Emerging Indian Filmmaker)
- 2018: Sunken Plum - Gu Xiang | China (in the category Best Performance in a Lead Role)
- 2018: Sunken Plum - Roberto F. Canuto & Xiaoxi Xu | China (in the category Best International Narrative Short Film)
- 2018: Goldfish - Yorgos Angelopoulos | Greece (in the category Best International Narrative Short Film)
- 2018: Mathias - Clara Stern | Austria (in the category Best Student Short Film)
- 2017: Beautiful Figure - Hajni Kis | The Netherlands (in the category Best Student Short Film)
- 2016: Beautiful Something - Brian Sheppard | USA (in the category Best Performance in a Lead Role)
- 2016: Antonio Altamirano San Cristóbal | Chile (in the category Best Performance in a Lead Role)
- 2016: Trade Queen - David Wagner | Germany (in the category Best International Narrative Short Film)
- 2016: Technical Difficulties of Intimacy - Joel Moffett | USA (in the category Best International Narrative Short Film)
- 2016: That's My Boy - Akhil Satyan | India (in the category Riyad Wadia Award for Best Emerging Indian Filmmaker)
- 2012: We The Outsiders... (Aamhi Ka Tisre...) - Ramesh Laxman More | India (in the category Riyad Wadia Award for Best Emerging Indian Filmmaker)
- 2010: Holding Hands - Tonnette Stanford and Katherine Wilkinson | Australia (in the category International Narrative Short)
- 2010: Flying Inside My Body - Sushmit Ghosh, Rintu Thomas, Sumit Sharma and Ajeeta Chowhan | India (in the category Documentary Short)
- 2010: Speak Up! It is Not My Fault - Deepika Lal | India (in the category Documentary Short)
- 2010: Dirty Magazines - Jay Levy | USA (in the category International Narrative Short)
- 2010: I Am Gay (Jag Ar Bog) - Nicolos Kolovos | Sweden (in the category International Narrative Short)

=== Special Jury Award ===
- 2012: Rites of Passage - Jeff Roy | USA
- 2011: I Am - Sonali Gulati | USA

=== KASHISH Coffee Break Audience Award ===
- 2013 onwards this competition was not held.
- 2012: Logging Out - Nakshatra Bagwe | India
- 2011: Nothing Happened - Julia Kots | USA

=== Best Poster Design ===
- 2026 : Pari Nirmal | Mumbai, India
- 2025 : Saman Me Kala | Auroville, India
- 2024 : Sithesh C Govind | Bengaluru, India
- 2023 : Tanishka Jain | Mumbai, India
- 2022 : Sreejith Mohan | Kochi, India
- 2021 : Ajoy Kumar Das | Mumbai, India
- 2020 : Joyston Moreira | London, UK
- 2019 : Domenico De Monte | Milan, Italy
- 2013 : Ashutosh Vyas | Mumbai, India
- 2017 : Benny Mathew | Mumbai, India
- 2016 : Ajoy Kumar Das | Mumbai, India
- 2015 : Niharika Rastogi | New Delhi, India
- 2014 : Punith Mahesh | Hyderabad, India
- 2013 : Prachi Patil-Kotkar | Mumbai, India
- 2012 : S Ayyappa | Vijayawada, India

=== KASHISH Rainbow Warrior Award ===
- 2025 : A Revathi | Chennai, India
- 2023 : Onir | Mumbai, India
- 2022 : Cory Walia | Mumbai, India
- 2019 : Hoshang Merchant | Hyderabad, India
- 2018 : Pawan Dhall | Kolkata, India
- 2017 : Laxmi Narayan Tripathi | Mumbai, India and Manavendra Singh Gohil | Rajpipla, India
- 2016 : Ruth Vanita | Montana, USA and (late) Saleem Kidwai| Lucknow, India
- 2015 : (late) Betu Singh | New Delhi, India
- 2014 : (late) Wendell Rodricks | Goa, India and Ashok Row Kavi | Mumbai, India

=== KASHISH Rainbow Champion Award ===
- 2026 : Aravani Art Project
- 2023 : Kinnar Asmita
- 2022 : Tweet Foundation
- 2019 : The Humsafar Trust

== See also ==
- List of LGBT film festivals
