= Solaris Pictures =

Indian film production company

- Type: Film & Television Production Company
- Industry: feature films, television commercials,
- Founded: 1991
- Headquarters: Mumbai, India
- Key people: Sridhar Rangayan; Saagar Gupta
- Website: Official website

Solaris Pictures is an Indian film production company based in Mumbai. It was created by Sridhar Rangayan, and Saagar Gupta in 2001. The two have gone on to create several award-winning films under Solaris Pictures' banner, focusing on LGBT issues and HIV/AIDS.

== Introduction ==
Solaris Pictures is an Indian film production company that has makes films covering issues such as homosexuality and gay rights.

Previous productions include: The Pink Mirror, which has won two Best Film awards, and was screened at over 72 festivals; Yours Emotionally, which was played at several international festivals; and 68 Pages, which won the Silver Remi award at the 2008 WorldFest Houston. These films are made in a unique style that combines Bollywood melodrama with international avant-garde film techniques.

Solaris Pictures is the associate producer of Project Bolo, an Indian LGBT oral history project that interviews 20 Indian LGBT people in Mumbai, Pune, Lucknow, and New Delhi.

Solaris Pictures has produced two documentary features about the LGBTQI community in India - Purple Skies (2014) and Breaking Free (2015). Purple Skies highlights the stories of LBGT people victimized and subjugated by the law, the family and society, as well as stories of youngsters who have come out of the closet bravely. The film was telecast on India's National Network Doordarshan in 2015. The film screened at 27 international film festivals.

In Breaking Free - Sec 377, filmmaker and gay activist Sridhar Rangayan exposes the human rights violations faced by the LGBTQ community in India due to a draconian law Section 377, and homophobic social mores of a patriarchal society. It won the Barbara Gittings Human Rights Award at qFLIX Philadelphia in 2016. [3]

The company has also collaborated in producing more than 100 hours of television content for serials like Rishtey, Gubbare, Kagaar and has produced advertising for companies like Life Insurance Corporation of India, H & R Johnson, Godrej, Rupa, Zee TV. Their social awareness films and spots for the National Institute for Hearing Handicapped, Cancer Patients Aid Association and Cama & Albless Hospital have been telecast on both DD National and Mumbai Doordarshan.

Solaris Pictures is one of the principal organizers of Kashish Mumbai Queer Film Festival that was first held in April 2010 in Mumbai at PVR Cinemas and Alliance Francaise and then in 2011 and 2012 at Cinemax Versova and Alliance Francaise.

Solaris Pictures has also organized Flashpoint Human Rights Film Festival in Mumbai and New Delhi in 2010/2011 and 2011/2012.

== Movies ==
=== Evening Shadows ===
Drama/ 102 mins / India / 2018 / Hindi with English subtitles
Directed by Sridhar Rangayan
Written by: Sridhar Rangayan & Saagar Gupta
Producer: Solaris Pictures

Evening Shadows - In a small town in Southern India that lives within a cocoon of traditions and social morality, when a young gay man Kartik (Devansh Doshi), comes out to his mother Vasudha (Mona Ambegaonkar), her entire world comes crashing down. She has no one to turn to dispel her fears and doubts, to understand her loving son's truth. Moreover, as a woman, trapped within a patriarchal conservative society, her biggest challenge is to deal with her dogmatic husband Damodar (Ananth Narayan Mahadevan), and the conservative society around her. Evening Shadows is a universal story about a mother-son bonding and its emotional strength to withstand the ravages of time and harsh realities.{ Source: imdb} Evening Shadows

The film has won 19 awards and screened at 72 international film festivals. It is currently streaming on Netflix.

=== Breaking Free ===
Documentary/ 82 mins / India / 2015 / English, Hindi subtitles
Directed by Sridhar Rangayan
Written by: Sridhar Rangayan & Saagar Gupta
Producer: Solaris Pictures

Breaking Free is a 2015 movie directed by Sridhar Rangayan and produced by Solaris Pictures. In this documentary, filmmaker and gay activist Sridhar Rangayan embarks on a personal journey to expose the human rights violations faced by the LGBTQ community in India due to a draconian law Section 377 and homophobic social mores of a patriarchal society. The film was selected to be part of the Indian Panorama (non-Fiction) and screened at International Film Festival of India in 2015.

It won the Rajat Kamal National Award for Best Editing (Non-Fiction) in 2016 for its editors Pravin Angre and Sridhar Rangayan. It also won the Barbara Gittings Human Rights Award at qFLIX Philadelphia in 2016. It is currently streaming on Netflix.

=== Purple Skies ===
Documentary/ 66 mins / India / 2014 / English, Hindi subtitles
Directed by Sridhar Rangayan
Written by: Sridhar Rangayan & Saagar Gupta
Producer: Public Service Broadcasting Trust and Solaris Pictures

Purple Skies is a 2014 movie directed by Sridhar Rangayan and produced by Public Service Broadcasting Trust and Solaris Pictures. It documents the opinions of lesbians, bisexuals and trans men in India. It was also broadcast on Doordarshan in 2015.

The documentary film showcases stories of the LGBT community about living in India and is the first documentary on LGBT topics to be screened on a national network, Doordarshan. As of 2015, it has been screened at 27 international film festivals.

=== 68 Pages ===
Drama/ 90 mins / India / 2007 / Hindi with English subtitles
Directed and Written by Sridhar Rangayan
Producer: Humsafar Trust
Associate Producer: Solaris Pictures

68 Pages explores the stigma around those who are HIV+ in India. Through 68 Pages of a counselor's diary, the stories of Paayal, a sex worker; Nishit, an intervenous drug user; Kiran, a gay man and Umrao, a transsexual bar dancer, are told.

=== Yours Emotionally ===
Drama/Gay / 86 mins / UK-India / 2006
Directed and Written by Sridhar Rangayan
Producer: Wise Thoughts (UK) Associate Producer: Solaris Pictures (India)

Two Brits, Ravi and Paul travel to India where they meet Murthy and Anna an older gay couple that have managed to form a partnership and live together for over 20 years. When Ravi meets and falls for Mani an Indian national who is betrothed to be married. He turns to the older couple for advice and help but traditions die hard in India. {Source: imdb} Yours Emotionally!

=== The Pink Mirror ===
Drama/Gay /40 mins / India / 2003 / Hindi wst English
Directed and Written by Sridhar Rangayan
Produced by Solaris Pictures (India)

The Pink Mirror pits two Indian drag queens against a western-influenced gay teenager in a struggle to woo a handsome suitor, presented as a clash between east and west. The drag queens' wit, innuendo and cunning expertise in the art of seduction stand in contrast with the gay teenager's provocative and more risqué flirtatious behaviour. At its surface, a campy humorous adventure film, the subject matter grapples with the complexities of gay culture in India, and explores human connections between the characters outside of traditional patriarchal family structures. Playing on the tropes of Bollywood song, dance and drama, set in the drag queens' native language of Hindi (a first in Indian cinema), the film addresses another cultural taboo tied to India's gay community: the lurking threat of HIV/AIDS. {Source: imdb} Gulabi Aaina The film is currently available for streaming on Netflix

== Awards ==
Solaris Pictures' films and television projects have won several awards, both Indian and international.

- Silver Remi Award at WorldFest 2008, Houston (for film "68 Pages")
- Jury Award for Best Film at ‘Fire Island Film Festival 2004, New York, USA (for film “Gulabi Aaina)
- Best Film of the Festival award at ‘Question de Genre’ film festival 2003, Lille, France

(for film “Gulabi Aaina)

- RAPA award for Best Comedy Episode, 1999 (for “Piya Ka Ghar” – Gubbare, Zee TV)
- RAPA award for Best Telefilm, 2000 (for “Khamoshiyaan” – Rishtey, Zee TV)
