= Yathartha Pictures =

YouTube channel

YouTube information
- Channel: YatharthaPics
- Years active: 2015-present
- Genres: Comedy; Music; Activism
- Website: yatharthapictures.com

Yathartha Pictures, also abbreviated as यP or YaPi, is a YouTube channel launched in 2015. A video featuring 7 Hijras (trans women) singing the National Anthem of India created by this channel went viral in August, 2015.

== History ==
YaPi published their first YouTube video "Can you tear up the Tricolour for 1000 INR" on 24 January 2015 to celebrate the 66th Republic Day of India which was shared by many e-papers and blogs. They created another video titled 'Bharatiya... Hum Bhi Hai' in August, 2015 to celebrate the 69th Independence Day of India as well as the NALSA Judgement of 2014. The video showed 7 Hijras dressed in outfits or uniforms of various professions and singing the National Anthem of India. The Hijras featured in the video were brought together by the Humsafar Trust, a Mumbai-based NGO which promotes LGBT rights. The video went viral in no time and was featured in all leading news papers, e-papers and blogs in India for being the first National Anthem video sung by Hijras as well as for showing how Hijras would look if they get the chance to take up any dignified career.
