= Yours Emotionally =

- Directed by: Sridhar Rangayan
- Written by: Niranjan Kamatkar; Sridhar Rangayan
- Produced by: Niranjan Kamatkar
- Starring: Premjit; Pratik Gandhi; Jack Lamport; Ikhlaq Khan; Ajai Rohilla
- Cinematography: Deepak Pandey
- Edited by: Nishant Radhakrishnan
- Music by: Ameya Naik and William Longden
- Distributed by: Waterbearer Films
- Release dates: 2006/UK-India: 13 March 2007
- Running time: 86 minutes
- Countries: United Kingdom; India
- Language: English

Yours Emotionally is a United Kingdom-Indian co-produced film written by Niranjan Kamatkar & Sridhar Rangayan and produced by arts charity Wise Thoughts (UK) & Solaris Pictures and directed by Rangayan. It stars Premjit, Pratik Gandhi, Jack Lamport, Ikhlaq Khan, and Ajai Rohilla. The film was selected for participation in LGBT film festivals in San Francisco (Frameline, formerly the San Francisco International Lesbian and Gay Film Festival), New York (NewFest), and others.

== Summary ==
The film raises issues of cultural identities and challenges stereotypes. It is an important milestone in making the Indian gay community visible. The film is written and produced by Niranjan Kamatkar of arts charity Wise Thoughts, London UK who is sole copyright holder, and was co-produced by Solaris Pictures, Mumbai, India.

The director Sridhar Rangayan, who earlier made the award-winning film The Pink Mirror, says that what is wonderful about this film is the fearless participation, for the first time, of more than 100 gay and transsexual members of groups like The Humsafar Trust in Mumbai and Lakshya in Gujarat.

Reviewing the film for Frameline30, Corey Eubanks wrote:

"From the director of The Pink Mirror (Frameline27) comes this intoxicating queer journey through India. Ravi is a young Indian man living in England who impulsively heads to an all-night gay party in an Indian village, dragging his British friend Paul along.

Fueled by erotic performances, flirting, and sex, Ravi connects at the party with Mani, a closeted working-class guy. Rooming at the very gay-friendly hotel belonging to Murthy and Anna, an older gay couple who have been together for more than thirty years, Ravi decides to stay for a few days to pursue what may be the love of his life, but the consequences of their hedonistic night catch up with them. With bursts of surreal images and scenes, Ravi tries to reconnect with Mani, but the situation becomes rocky when his slutty friend, Paul, flaunts his own careless hook-up with Mani.

Thankfully, Ravi has the wisdom of Murthy and Anna to guide him. They share their stories of defying tradition, loving against all odds and being true to oneself. Invigorated by his time with the couple, Ravi meets Mani once again to see if their fates may indeed be intertwined. In addition to the colorful and bizarre situations, the camera lingers lovingly over the queer Indian male body and exalts its sexuality. With a consistently surreal look, Yours Emotionally feels like a beautiful fever dream inspired by both avant-garde gay cinema and the tropes of Bollywood."

== Synopsis ==
Two best friends, Ravi and Paul, go on vacation to India where they attend an all night, eye-opening gay sex party. Surprised by the openness of their hosts and the aggressiveness of the guests, the boys fall into the steadily growing Indian gay culture. Ravi is especially bitten hard as he falls for the good looking but deeply closeted Mani. Will caste, economics and customs allow these two love birds a happy ending or will the forces of tradition and homophobia keep them apart?

== Consensus ==
Fueled by flirting, erotic performances, and open sex, Yours Emotionally is a revealing film about the growing Indian gay community. The camera lingers over the hot bodies of Indian men and never shirks from giving gay men a sexuality seldom seen from this part of the world. Sridhar Rangayan uses both traditional and experimental film techniques to build a story of love, compassion and truth in a society that is only now beginning to accept gay people for who they are. Source - TLA Videos

== Cast ==
- Premjit
- Pratik Gandhi
- Jack Lamport
- Ikhlaq Khan
- Ajay Rohilla
- Iravati Karnik
- Abhay Kulkarni
- Mansoor
- Ashwin

== Screenings ==
2007

- 4th Independent South Asian Film Festival, Seattle, USA
- Siddharth Gautam Film Festival, Kolkata, India
- Renberg Theatre, Los Angeles by LA Gay & Lesbian Center, USA

2006

- Santa Fe Film Festival. Santa Fe Film Center, Santa Fe, USA
- Rialto Filmtheater, Amsterdam, Netherlands
- Sixth Annual IAAC Film Festival, Maya Deren Theatre, New York, USA
- 'A Million Different Loves!?', Gdansk & Lodz, Poland
- Prague Bollywood Festival, Poland
- Fire Island Film and Video festival, Cheery Grove, New York, USA
- Frameline 30 - San Francisco International LGBT Film Festival, USA
- NewFest 2006 - The 18th New York LGBT Film Festival, USA

== Reviews ==
- Variety
- Bay Area Reporter
- Frameline
- East Bay Express
- India Currents
- NewFest
- Frameline News
- India New England
- New York Times
- Fulvuedrive
