= PSBT =

PSBT may refer to:

- Phase shaped binary transmission
- Power Sector Benefit Trust
- PsbT, a small chloroplast-encoded hydrophobic polypeptide
- Public Service Broadcasting Trust, India
- pyrosequence-based typing
- Partially signed Bitcoin transaction
