= Purple Skies =

- Directed by: Sridhar Rangayan
- Written by: Sridhar Rangayan
- Produced by: Public Service Broadcasting Trust
- Distributed by: Solaris Pictures
- Release date: 21 June 2014
- Running time: 66 minutes
- Country: India
- Language: Hindi/ English

Purple Skies is a 2014 movie directed by Sridhar Rangayan and produced by Public Service Broadcasting Trust and Solaris Pictures. It documents the opinions of lesbians, bisexuals and trans men in India. It was broadcast on Doordarshan in 2015.

The documentary film showcases stories of the LGBT community about living in India and is the first documentary on LGBT topics to be screened on a national network, Doordarshan. As of 2015, it has been screened at 27 international film festivals.

== Cast ==
- Betu Singh
- Sonal Giani
- Maya Lisa-Shanker
- Shobhna S Kumar
- Raj Kanaujiya

== Screenings ==
- Reel Queer Film Series 2015, Buffalo, USA
- 38 Frameline San Francisco International LGBT Film Festival
- GAZE International LGBT Film Festival, Dublin
- 5th Annual Chicago South Asian Film Festival, 2014
- 13th Prague Indian Film Festival, 2014
- 10th Gay Film Night International Film Festival, Romania, 2014
- 18th Seattle Lesbian & Gay Film Festival, USA, 2014
- 13th Q! Film Festival, Indonesia, 2014
- Trikone Australasia Queer Film Night, Melbourne, Australia, 2014
- 3rd Everybody's Perfect, Geneva, Switzerland, 2014
- South Asian Film Festival, North Carolina, 2014
- Florence Queer Festival, Italy, 2014
- Festival of Lesbian Identities, Budapest, 2014
- Sappho LGBT Film Festival, Kolkata, 2014
- 5th KASHISH Mumbai International Queer Film Festival, Mumbai
