= Evening Shadows =

2018 film

- Official Poster
- Directed by: Sridhar Rangayan
- Written by: Sridhar Rangayan; Saagar Gupta
- Produced by: Sridhar Rangayan; Saagar Gupta; Mohammed Shaik Hussain Ali; Karim Ladak
- Starring: Mona Ambegaonkar; Ananth Narayan Mahadevan; Devansh Doshi; Arpit Chaudhary; Yamini Singh; Abhay Kulkarni; Veena Nair; Kala Ramnathan; Disha Thakur; Sushant Divgikar; Faredoon Bhujwala
- Cinematography: Subhransu Das
- Edited by: Pravin Angre
- Music by: Song: Shubha Mudgal; Background Score: Suresh Iyer
- Production company: Solaris Pictures
- Release dates: 25 February 2018 (Australia); 1 March 2018 (India)
- Running time: 102 minutes
- Country: India
- Language: Hindi

Evening Shadows is a 2018 Indian Hindi-language drama film directed by Sridhar Rangayan. The film stars Mona Ambegaonkar, Ananth Narayan Mahadevan, Devansh Doshi, Arpit Chaudhary, Yamini Singh, Abhay Kulkarni, Veena Nair, Kala Ramnathan, Disha Thakur, Sushant Divgikar and Faredoon Bhujwala.

It was produced under the banner of Solaris Pictures with screenplay written by Rangayan and Saagar Gupta, and dialogues by Gupta.

It has won 25 international Awards and has become a success in international film festival circuit with selection in 75 international film festivals.

The film had a limited theatrical release in India beginning 11 January 2019. It was released in PVR Cinemas in Mumbai, New Delhi, Kolkata, Bangalore, Hyderabad and Nagpur.

The film received critical reviews with an average of 3 rating out of 5, with reviewers mentioning the film to be "a vivid portrayal of a coming out story that's as warm as it is raw and complex" and "this one deserves to be watched and supported for its context and space".

== Plot ==
In a small town in Southern India that lives within a cocoon of traditions and social morality, when a young gay man Kartik (Devansh Doshi) comes out to his mother Vasudha (Mona Ambegaonkar), her entire world comes crashing down. She has no one to turn to for dispelling her fears and doubts, to understand her loving son's truth. Moreover, as a woman trapped within a patriarchal conservative society, her biggest challenge is to deal with her dogmatic husband Damodar (Ananth Mahadevan), and the conservative society around her. Evening Shadows is a universal story about a mother-son bonding and its emotional strength to withstand the ravages of time and harsh realities.

== Cast ==
| Actor | Character | Role |
|---|---|---|
| Mona Ambegaonkar | Vasudha | A South Indian mother caught up in patriarchal mores who has to face the challenge of accepting her gay son. |
| Ananth Narayan Mahadevan | Damodar | A stern patriarch who imposes his ideas and will on everyone in his family. |
| Devansh Doshi | Kartik | A young photographer who returns to his hometown and wants to come out his mother. |
| Arpit Chaudhary | Aman | Kartik's love interest, who is worried not only about his lover being away from him but also is bothered by the Section 377 verdict in the Supreme Court of India. |
| Yamini Singh | Sarita | A perky divorced aunt who hides her pain behind her ebullience. |
| Abhay Kulkarni | Ramesh Chacha | A married man who harbours secret desires. |
| Veena Nair | Lata | Wife of Ramesh Chacha, who is so caught up caring for her kids, that she doesn't notice her husband's wandering eyes. |
| Sushant Divgikar | Sushant | Playing their true self, they have some quirky one-liners. |

== Production ==
The script of the film was written in 2009, and some part of production money was raised through crowdfunding by the production company Solaris Pictures. The shooting of the film was carried out in November and December 2016 in and around Mysore, Karnataka. The film features very scenic locations like Balmuri, Karigatta, Srirangapatna and several archaeological sites at Talkad.

The post production of the film was completed by end of 2017. In a landmark decision, the Central Board for Film Certification gave the film a UA certificate in December 2017.

== Reception ==
Evening Shadows premiered on 25 February 2018 at Mardi Gras Film Festival in Sydney to sold-out show. Director Sridhar Rangayan, lead actress Mona Ambegaonkar, actress Kala Ramnathan and co-producer Maulik Thakkar attended the world premiere. The film had its Indian Premiere at the Bengaluru International Film Festival on 1 March 2018. It was the Opening Film at the Lonavala International Film Festival on September 7, 2018, a day after the Supreme Court verdict on Sec 377.

Evening Shadows has traveled to more than 75 international film festivals across the world. It has won 25 awards including jury and audience awards for Best Film, as well as awards for Best performance for Mona Ambegaonkar and a Best Cinematography award.

It was the closing film at KASHISH Mumbai International Queer Film Festival.

Eminent actress Shabana Azmi watched the film Evening Shadows at the Lonavala International Film Festival on 7 September 2018 at Trios Plaza theater and said, "I feel that all families, especially in our country, should see this film. I hope that a big studio, or a big producer will embrace this film and present it. I strongly feel that this film will run, it will be successful at the box office. I have full trust that this film will be a hit." She also said she will try to help in mainstream release of the film.

As of April 2019 the movie is streaming on Netflix.

== Soundtrack ==
The film Evening Shadows features one song Surmaee Shaam composed and sung by legendary classical musician Shubha Mudgal. The lyrics are written by Saagar Gupta and the music arrangement is by Shantanu Nandan Herlekar. The soundtrack has been released on platforms like Saavn, iTunes etc.

== Outreach ==
10% of the money raised through crowdfunding on Wishberry is donated by Solaris Pictures to facilitate formation of a support group for parents of LGBTQ children in India, along the lines of PFLAG-type groups in the USA. The parent support group in India was formed as Sweeekar - The Rainbow Parents. The group now has around 50 parents (mothers and fathers) of gay, lesbian, bisexual and transgender children. They have taken part in workshops, marched in pride walks and also have been speakers at panel discussions at events like KASHISH Mumbai International Queer Film Festival.

== Awards ==
- Best LGBTQ Feature Film at YathaKatha International Film & Literature Festival
- Best Direction for Sridhar Rangayan at the Asian Cinematography AWARDS
- Best Cinematography of a Feature Film for Subhransu Das at the Asian Cinematography AWARDS
- Best Costume Design for Bipin Tanna at the Asian Cinematography AWARDS
- Best Actress Award at Queer Film Festival Playa Del Carmen, Mexico
- Apnee Community Best Cinematography Award at New Jersey Indian & International Film Festival
- Audience Award for Best International Feature at Romania LGBTQ film festival
- Honour Prize at Zinegoak film festival, Bilbao
- Best Narrative Feature at Chicago South Asian Film Festival
- Audience Choice Award at Caleidoscope Indian Film Festival, Boston
- Audience Award for Best Feature at Outreels, Cincinnati
- Best International Feature audience award at Out On Film, Atlanta
- Best Performance in a Supporting Role at Out At The Movies, Winston-Salem
- Best Performance in a Supporting Role at Rainbow Umbrella Film Festival, London
- Best Performance (Special Mention) at OMovies, Naples
- Vincenzo Ruggiero award at OMovies, Naples
- Best Foreign Film at Rainbow Umbrella Film Festival, London
- Jury Award for Best Men's Feature at North Carolina Gay & Lesbian Film Festival
- Best LGBTQ Film award at Lifft India Filmotsav-World Cine Fest, Lonavla
- Hope Award at Caleidoscope Indian Film Festival, Boston
- Interfaith Discernment Award at Kansas International Film Festival
- ‘Celebration of Courage’ award at OUT HERE NOW: Kansas City LGBT Film Festival
- 'Free To Be Me' award at Roze Filmdagen, Amsterdam
- Best Film at Changing Face International Film Festival (February)
- Best Film at UK Monthly Film Fest (January)
