= R. Raj Rao =

Indian writer, teacher, gay-rights activist

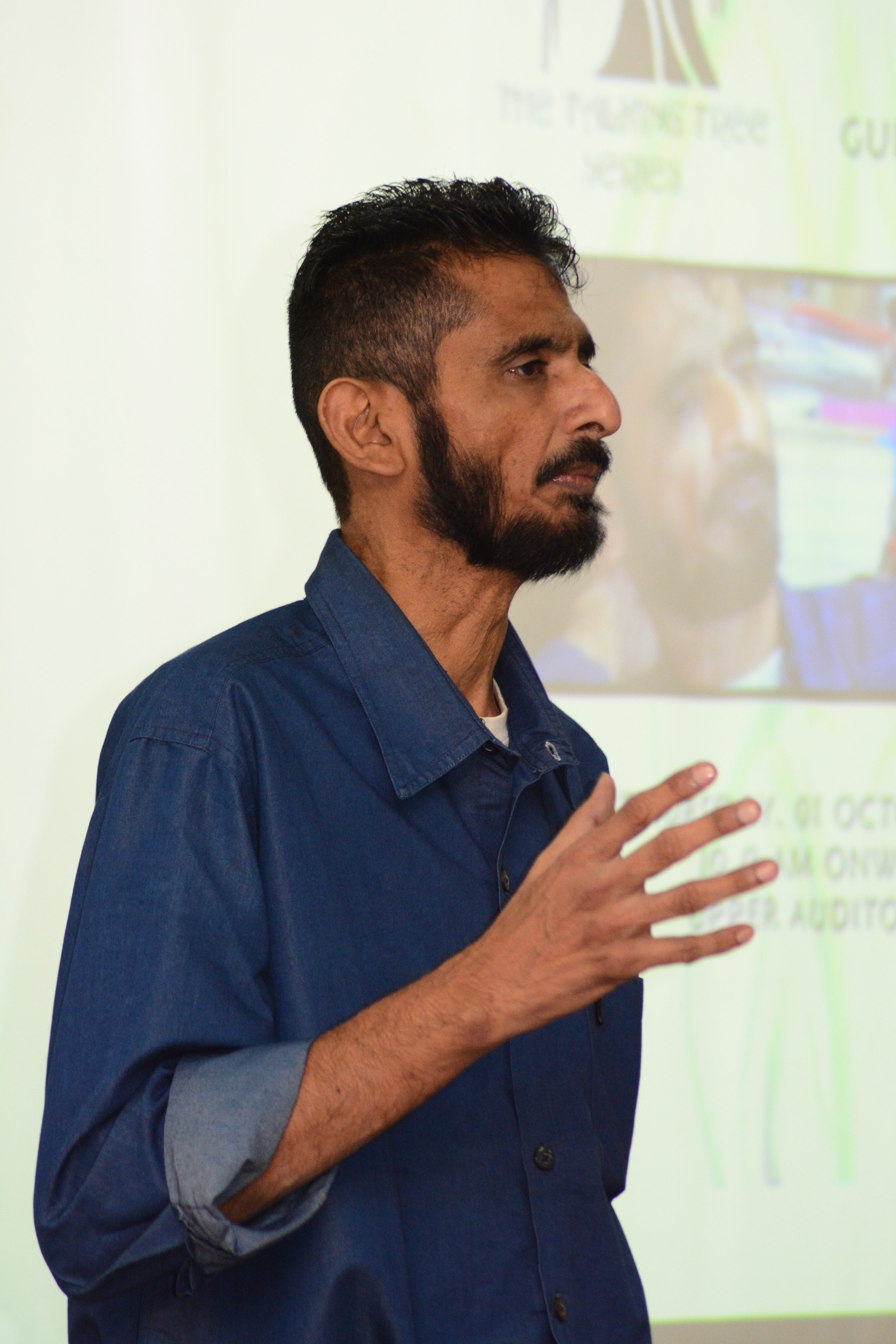
- Born: 6 April 1955 (age 71); Bombay, India
- Education: University of Bombay; University of Warwick
- Occupations: Writer, professor of literature
- Writing career
- Genres: Poststructuralism, LGBT literature
- Notable work: The Boyfriend

Ramachandrapurapu Raj Rao (born 6 April 1955) is an Indian writer, poet and teacher of literature who has been described as "one of India's leading gay-rights activists". His 2003 novel The Boyfriend is one of the first gay novels to come from India. Rao was one of the first recipients of the newly established Quebec-India awards.

== Personal life ==
R. Raj Rao was born in Bombay, India. He earned a PhD in English from the University of Bombay in 1986 and received the Nehru Centenary British Fellowship for his post-doctoral research at the Centre for Caribbean Studies, University of Warwick, UK He attended the International Writing Program, Iowa, in 1996. His works include Slide Show (poems). He has edited Ten Indian Writers in Interview and co-edited Image of India in the Indian Novel in English (1960–1980). He works as a professor and head of the English Department at the University of Pune. Rao is openly gay. On the recurring themes of homosexuality in his works, Rao says: "I am myself a poet, novelist, playwright and writer of non-fiction. Similarly, my teaching and research interests in queer theory and queer literature are a direct and natural outcome of my being gay and imaginatively tackling the subject in my fiction, poetry and plays." His poems appeared in many prestigious poetry anthologies like The Dance of the Peacock besides other noted journals and anthologies.

== Rao in the queer scene ==
Poems from Rao's BOMGaY collection served as the basis for Riyad Vinci Wadia's film Bomgay (1996), said to be India's first gay film. The Boyfriend was his first novel. It was released with fanfare by Penguin India all over the country in 2003. Filled with irreverent, dry humour and devoid of sentimentality, The Boyfriend is a tragi-comic love story set in the jumbled up heart of Mumbai. According to a blurb, "[The Boyfriend] also deals with unsparing irony the realities of caste, class, religion, masculinity and the gay subculture in India". It created quite a stir when it first appeared and was discussed in many prominent magazines as a guide to the then underground gay subculture in Bombay. It went on to be used as a model for the queer scene in India in researches in the field of queer studies.

Rao published the non-fiction work Whistling in the Dark in 2009, the novels Hostel Room 131 in 2010 and Lady Lolita's Lover in 2015.

Following the success of The Boyfriend, Rao founded the Queer Studies Circle at Pune University. Rao was one of the first to offer a course on LGBT literature at the university level in India. Rao first offered it in 2007, after years of resistance on the part of his academic superiors. He said: "It's strange how the academic fraternity that has always been quick to accept all kinds of literature — Marxist, feminist, Dalit — had a huge reservation when it came to queer literature. For years, the Board of Studies refused to let us start the course saying that 'Indian students do not need it'. Finally we clubbed it with Dalit literature and started it under the genre of Alternative Literature."

== Works ==
- Sildeshow (Peepal Tree Press, 1992), poems
- Image of India in the Indian Novel in English (1960–1985) (South Asia Books, 1993), co-editor with Sudhakar Pandey
- Nissim Ezekiel: The Authorized Biography (Viking, 2000)
- One Day I Locked My Flat in Soul City (HarperCollins India, 2001), short stories
- The Wisest Fool on Earth and Other Plays (The Brown Critique, Kolkata)
- The Boyfriend (Penguin, 2003), novel
- Whistling in the Dark: Twenty-One Queer Interviews (Sage, 2009), co-editor with Dibyajyoti Sarma
- Hostel Room 131 (2010), novel
- Lady Lolita's Lover (HarperCollins India, 2015), novel
- Ten Indian Authors in Interview, editor
- Madam, Give Me My Sex (Bloomsbury India, 2019), novel
