= The Boyfriend (novel) =

Novel

- Author: R. Raj Rao
- Language: English
- Genre: LGBT literature
- Publisher: Penguin India
- Publication date: 2003
- Publication place: India
- Media type: Print
- Pages: 127
- ISBN: 978-0-143-02874-1

The Boyfriend, written in 2003 is R. Raj Rao's first novel. Based in Mumbai, India, it discusses the city's gay subculture against a backdrop of the 1992 riots and discusses caste, class and masculinities.

== Plot summary ==
The novel is set in Mumbai, India. Yudi, a freelancing journalist in the city, cruises around Churchgate railway station and picks up a young, Dalit boy outside the men's washroom. They have sex and the boy introduces himself as Kishore Mahadik. Kishore leaves Yudi his address.

Post the Bombay riots, Yudi's looks for Kishore. He discovers that Kishore had given him a wrong address. His editor introduces him to an upcoming painter, Gauri. Gauri likes Yudi and confides in him that she has left her husband. She gets a drunk Yudi home after a party one night, pays him an unwelcome visit later and bargains her way to a lunch with him. Yudi then visits Gauri at her place. The next day, he spots Kishore in an elevator. Kishore gives Yudi his real name, Milind Mahadik, his address, and confesses that he is an Untouchable. Yudi is unperturbed and claims that his homosexuality makes him an outcaste too. In a disco, Yudi and Milind confess their love for each other.

They spend a week at Yudi's Place in Nalla Sopara and mock a marriage in Yudi's bedroom. Due to an extended holiday with Yudi to Shravanabelagola to see the naked statue of Gommateshwara, Milind is laid off from his work. Yudi gives him pocket money and finds him work with Gauri's ecofeminist group. Milind is tasked with sticking posters across town about the group's activities and feels good about the work and the money that comes with it. But he is laid off again due to the group's dwindling funds. When Yudi finds Milind another job, the latter disappears. Yudi is depressed at the disappearance and calls at Milind's home for information. His mother and Gauri come over to support him, both of them trying to realize Gauri as a permanent mate for Yudi. Milind, meanwhile, finds himself at A.K. Modelling Agency in Goregaon, an organization that supplies men for magazine advertisements and prostitution. After a customer rapes him, he escapes from the Agency and returns home. His parents wish to get him married and he concedes, seeing marriage as a natural next step. When his family members tell him about Yudi's visit, he gets angry and gives Yudi his wedding invitation.

Milind and his wife find themselves a house and raise a family, falling on hard times because Milind refused to work. His wife, Leela, urges him to reach out to Yudi to ask for money, knowing of Yudi only as Milind's rich friend. Milind finds Yudi with Gauri who is now sisterly towards him. Yudi and Milind have sex and Milind asks for his pocket money again, which Yudi happily gives him, telling Gauri that "[he has] come to the conclusion that life is beautiful".

== Characters ==
- Yudi
- Milind
- Gauri
- Yudi's mother
- Dnyaneshwar

== Themes ==
=== Queer spaces ===
Rao’s Bombay, however, is a step behind these exciting times of queer self assertion; the most that the gay community can expect out of the urban locus is a sense of connectedness, a shared invisibility in the mainstream spaces and a shared “haunting” of urban queer spaces.

— Sucheta Mallick Choudhuri in Transgressive territories: queer space in Indian fiction and film, Iowa Research Online, University of Iowa, 2009

Space is a central theme in Rao's novel. Most of the chapter titles are names of places where important things happen and the narrative can be read as a journey through different spaces. Such spaces are "always on the move" in loos, discos and trains as opposed to a Western queer space where decriminalized homosexuality allowed gay people to position themselves within larger communities.

The story is set in what can be called BomGay, a fictional, invisible, queer space where "(homo)sexual explicitness... becomes the foundation for erotic realism" mapped onto the real city. This queer imagination of the city is nasty and unpleasant, a strategy that Rao uses to challenge oppression and mainstream narratives. Moreover, this queer space is not a universal one, but distinctly Indian, with its caste relations. The queer space exists as a mysterious and subversive reality against Section 377, a law that criminalized homosexuality during the events of the novel.

The transgressions in city-spaces in The Boyfriend link space and sexuality. They show that the dominant definition of a place which has defined codes of behaviour is a constructed entity and challenge these codes by unexpectedly transgressing them.

=== Nation and community ===
The national and, more significantly, the nationalist frameworks of postcolonial India prolong the colonial production of normative gender and sexuality. In such a structural duplication of the social norm, reproductive heterosexuality attains legitimacy as the unique, “natural” choice of the postcolonial nation.

— Sandeep Bakshi in Fractured Resistance: Queer Negotiations of the Postcolonial in R. Raj Rao's The Boyfriend, South Asian Review, Volume 33, October 2012

The Boyfriend discusses nation and nationalism as it relates to sexuality. The postcolonial nation-state, through institutionalizing marriage, abhors homosexuality. Bakshi argues that in doing so, it "produces and reproduces" codes of sexuality and gender that were present in the colonial nation (India before independence). Moreover, while Yudi is able to transcend the nation, Milind "internalizes" the nation and the heteronormative ideas that nation brings along. A response to Bakshi claims that nation-based binaries are made visible through Yudi but undercut by frequently and recurrently giving Milind a similar space to Yudi's, bringing into focus the privileges that the nation confers upon Yudi.

Set after the Bombay riots of 1992-93, Rao comments on how the idea of the nation is embedded in the idea of a community. Indian Islam is considered a result of alien Mughal invasions as opposed to Hinduism whose legitimacy is seen to come from its nativity. One review has called Rao's critique of the communal tensions as a critique of the nation-building processes, though being "verged on defeatism". Bakshi sees the construction of a hyper-masculine "Hindu" India as a reaction to colonial feminization, and guerrilla warfare against Muslims as a way of displaying such masculinity.
