= Yeh Hai Chakkad Bakkad Bumbe Bo =

- Directed by: Sridhar Rangayan
- Written by: Vijay Tendulkar; Sushma Bakshi
- Based on: original work by Shakuntala Paranjpye.
- Produced by: Children's Film Society, India
- Cinematography: Sudhir Palsane
- Edited by: Jabeen Merchant
- Music by: Kamlesh
- Release date: 2003
- Running time: 90 minutes
- Country: India
- Language: Hindi

Yeh Hai Chakkad Bakkad Bumbe Bo (also known as The Sensational Six) is a 2003 Indian children's film directed by Sridhar Rangayan, and written by Vijay Tendulkar and Sushma Bakshi. The film is based on a short story by Shakuntala Paranjpye and was shot on location over 20 days in Mandangad, Bankot and Mumbai.

== Plot ==
The peace of their small Konkan village is shattered when four adventurous children come upon the dangerous smuggler Don Douglas. Two of the boys are caught spying and taken away by his goons. With the help of their monkey Sikander and their dog Birbal, the rest of the team must rescue them.

== Cast ==
- Mona Ambegaonkar
- Aardra Athalye
- Rahul Joshi
- Ravindra Mankani as Headmaster
- Anvay Ponkshe
- Tom Alter
- Seema Ponkshe as Fisherwoman
- Brij Bhushan Sahni as Fisherman
- Bakul Thakker
- Vinay Katore

== Awards ==
- 2004 Bronze Remi Award for Best Film at WorldFest-Houston International Film Festival
