= Flashpoint Human Rights Film Festival =

2010 film festival in Mumbai

Flashpoint Human Rights Film Festival was a four-day festival held in Mumbai, India between 8–10 December 2010. It screened eight films from around the world that dealt with human rights issues at a macro as well as at a micro level; from global concerns to indigenous issues. The festival concluded on the International Human Rights Day, 10 December 2010.

== Program ==
The eight documentaries screened at Flashpoint Human Rights Film Festival were part of the Matter of Act program at Movies That Matter film festival 2010 held in March 2010 at The Hague, Netherlands. The films highlight the work done by human rights defenders across the world and the dangers they face in their work, which are not always in countries where civil liberties are honored. Festival director Sridhar Rangayan said, "I saw these films as a jury member at the festival in the Netherlands and was so moved by the films, I was determined to bring them to India to share with audiences here." The films dealt with human rights issues like human trafficking and prostitution of children; Violations of international laws on war and peace; Atrocities under military regimes; Religious fundamentalism and homophobia; women's rights and honor killings; and civil war and the killing of innocents.

Each day of the screenings, panel discussions were held on each topic screened. The panelists included filmmakers Bishakha Datta, Vinta Nanda; rights activist Priti Patkar, advocates Colin Gonsalves, PA Sebastian, Flavia Agnes and Usha Andevar. The panels were moderated by Vinta Nanda, Dalip Daswani and Gargi Sen respectively. Three of the activists portrayed in the documentaries: Rebiya Kadeer, Somaly Mam, and Mu Sochua, have been nominated for the Nobel Peace Prize. Messages sent by them and some of the film-makers were shared with the audience at the festival. Film director and rights activist Mahesh Bhatt inaugurated the festival by asking "how do we as a society... go about igniting change in 'this climate of collective apathy to human suffering'" together with theatre actress and director Dolly Thakore. Of the festival, she said "This will open up avenues and provide a direction to youngsters".

A wide range of questions and discussions emerged from the audience of social activists, filmmakers, and film buffs, such as whether honor killings are different from stonings, how different are democracies with cartels and autocracies, what the relationship is between violence and families, and how individuals can effect change in the world.

== Organizers ==
The festival was conceived and founded by Sridhar Rangayan, who is also the festival director. Gargi Sen is the co-director. The festival was organized by Solaris Pictures (Mumbai) along with Magic Lantern Foundation (New Delhi) and Movies That Matter (Netherlands) in association with the Alliance française.
