= Aravani Art Project =

Public art collective in India

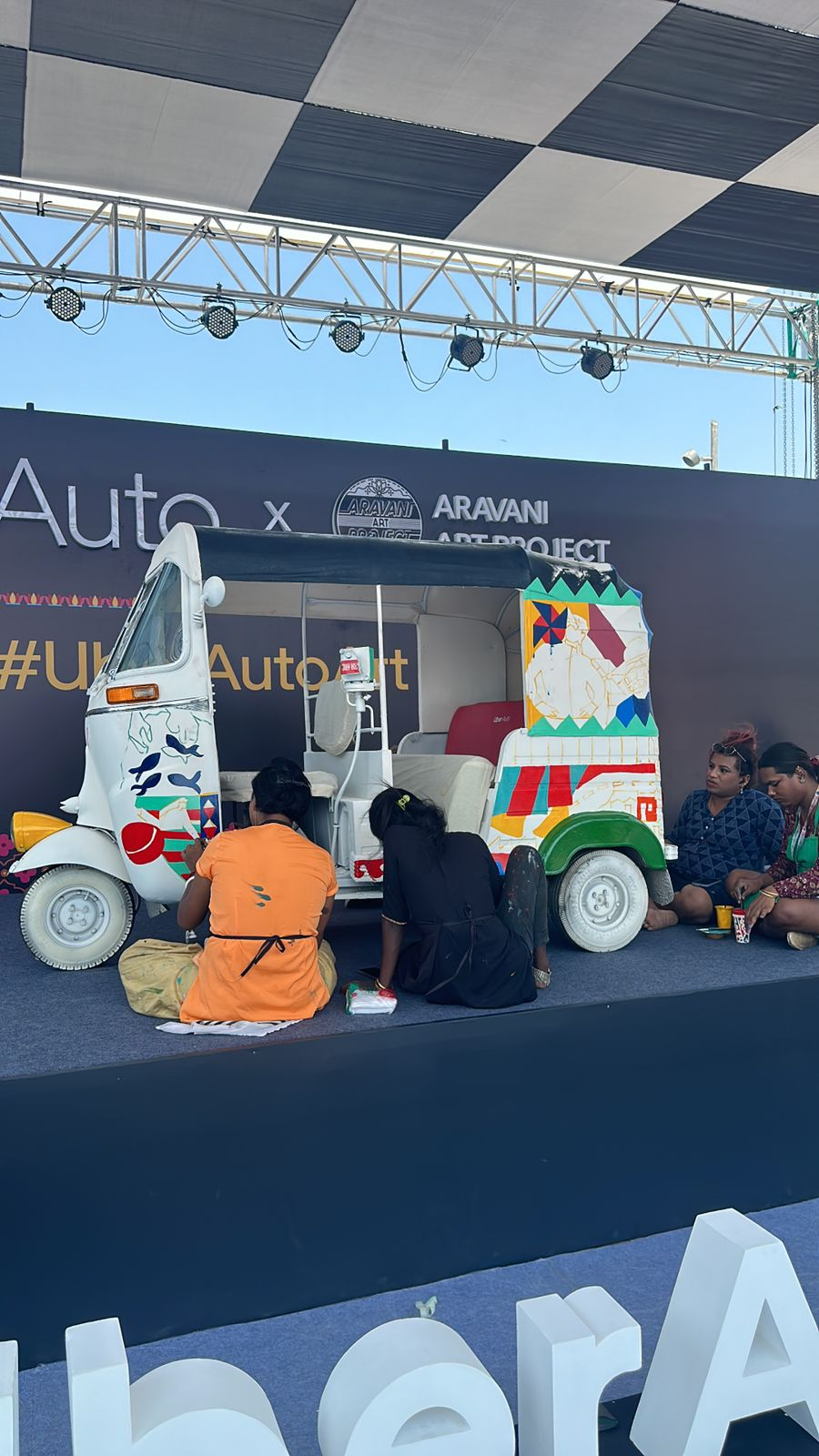
- Artists at Work, Aravani Art Project in Mumbai, 15 April 2023
- Known for: Public Art, Murals
- Movement: Artivism, Feminist Art
- Awards: Awesome Without Borders Grant
- Website: https://aravaniartproject.com

Aravani Art Project is an Indian public art collective, run by trans and cis women. Initiated by Bangalore-based artist Poornima Sukumar, the project brings together people from the transgender community who paint murals inspired by their lives and experiences, in and around public spaces in the city. The project is named after the annual Aravani Festival that takes place in the Koothandavar Temple, Tamil Nadu, where thousands of members from the transgender community assemble to perform the rituals of being married to Lord Aravan. While it began locally in Bangalore in the year 2016, the members of the project have traveled to different parts of India and Sri Lanka in their mission to spread awareness and reclaim public spaces through the medium of art.

As of 2022, the Aravani Art Project has painted murals on the entrance and walkway of the India Art Fair.

== Inception ==
In 2015, artist Poornima Sukumar, derived inspiration from the Aravani Festival of Koovagam Temple in naming and creating the project that would eventually become the Aravani Art Project. The project was set up in Bangalore, in 2016. The director of the project, Sukumar, had experience and knowledge of the lives of trans people in India, who identify as hijra, through her documentary research. The project was created as a space where members of the community could engage in conversations and transform their narratives through street art.

Since 2016, Poornima Sukumar and her team, which now includes Shanthi Muniswamy, Karnika Bai, Vicky Shinde, Kanchana, Jyothi, Shwetha, Smita Avimuktha, Varsha, Chandri, Purushi, Aishu, Mayuri, Kajal and many other people from the transgender community have been actively involved in various painting projects across the country. Although the project is founded by Poornima Sukumar, it took shape along with her former work partner Sadhna Prasad . The back-hand team now consists of Nandini Rajaram, Murugan, Deepak George, Boodhesh, Aditi and so on

== Structure and Method ==
In 2016, Sukumar gathered a few members from the hijra transgender community and painted their first mural in Bangalore city. Aravani Art Project's initial work focused on small scale pieces where they used the metaphors of the wall as society. Huge and colorful murals were painted, and members of the community stood against this backdrop, camouflaged in the same color patterns. This was meant to signify their inclusion within society. The project has expanded to paint murals over different metropolitan city spaces around India, and has completed an international project in Colombo, Sri Lanka. Likewise, members of the collective are ever-growing and join them in creating the paintings from various parts of the country.

=== Style ===
The art works created by the project are mainly murals. They span walls - of city spaces, classrooms, school/college facades, even halls of public buildings like theaters, corporate offices, libraries and restaurants/pubs. Each mural project encapsulates a specific theme relating to gender, sexuality, freedom, even ecological awareness. Their art practice aims to archive traditional language, song, myths and stories of the transgender community. The art forms reflect a vector art style of drawing and painting. Many of them contain one line messages that emphasize freedom, dignity of existence, differences in human lives, and the importance of sustainable practices. The locations of these murals are often close to their community spaces, in order to ensure a close relationship with their bases.

=== Themes ===
The Aravani Art Project attempts to herald a change in the way transgender experiences and lives are seen in society. Members of the transgender community are claiming visibility, inclusion and rightful opportunities in society to a larger extent in the current day and age. Their representation in popular culture have increased to a certain extent from before. However, the stigma around their identities and gender expression still remains. In most spaces they face discrimination and systemic inequalities, even violence.

The project visualizes the occupation of spaces that are denied to persons from gender and sexual minority communities. Through art, they aim to raise awareness and increase conversations regarding rights, sharing experiences and reclaiming spaces. They attempt to create a change in society through a form of artistic activism that enables members of the LGBTQIA+ community to enter public spaces confidently and create safe experiences.

=== Reception ===
The Aravani Art Project has grown to a large scale since its inception in 2016. They have completed over 60 projects, spanning across ten cities. They have collaborated with St+Art India Foundation, various MNC's like Microsoft, Wipro, Goldmann Sachs and JP Morgan. They have also collaborated with local theaters, art galleries, the India Art Fair, public libraries and educational institutions in running workshops, creating murals that inform and aesthetically brightens public spaces.

== Work ==
=== Major Projects ===
The Aravani Art Project has completed more than sixty projects across India and Sri Lanka. Some of the major ones include:

1. Social Impact Mural: Soho Mumbai, commissioned the project to create a mural highlighting equality, fraternity and sustainability on a private beach facing wall, in February, 2020.
2. Not Just Faces: an exhibition of sixty portraits painted by the members, accompanied by oral narratives of their lives and experiences at the Serendipity Arts Festival, Goa, December, 2019.
3. Painting of Story Walls, in collaboration with Pratham Books, where members painted three classroom walls, in over three different government schools, highlighting trans and women's narratives. July, 2018.
4. Trans Lives Matter: St+Art India Foundation, in Delhi, invited the project to work on a large scale mural on a school wall in Lodhi Colony. This saw the collaboration of women from Delhi's transgender community as well. The mural paid homage to transgender persons who paved the way for awareness and social activism within their communities.
5. Dharavi Wall Mural: Aarogya Seva and Youth Rap group, Dawgz in collaboration with The Humsafar Trust, Mumbai, invited members of the Aravani Art Project to paint a common wall in Dharavi, which saw the meeting of many youth and children. The project was commissioned in 2016.
6. Meri Identity, Meri Pehchaan: The project collaborated with Pushpa Mai and all her disciples from the Transgender community of Rajasthan, in creating a mural at the Vivek Vihar Metro Station in Jaipur in March 2017. The aim of the mural is to create awareness of the structural inequalities that the transgender community faces in availing public funds, jobs and services due to the lack of identification systems.

=== Locations ===
The Aravani Art Project has completed projects across various locations in India including - Bangalore, Hyderabad, Delhi, Jaipur, Kolkata, Chennai, Pune, Mumbai and Kochi. They have also completed International projects in Kathmandu, Nepal and Colombo, Sri Lanka.

=== Awards and nominations ===
The Aravani Art Project was awarded an Awesome Without Borders Grant by the Awesome Foundation in July, 2017.
