= Betu Singh =

- Born: November 25, 1964
- Died: October 4, 2013 (aged 48)

Betu Singh (25 November 1964 to 4 October 2013) was a lesbian rights activist, born in an Army family in Kolkata. She set up the Sangini Trust, an NGO based in Delhi under the umbrella of the Naz Foundation, in 1997 to fight for lesbian rights. The NGO works for women attracted to women and individuals dealing with their gender identity (F to M), providing emergency response services to LBT individuals facing rights violations. Sangini is the oldest non-governmental organization in India to reach out to LBT (Lesbian, Bisexual and Transgender) persons and one of the few registered lesbian organisations in India.

== Early life ==
Betu Singh went to Sophia Girls' School in Meerut and attended Meerut University. She was a vocal woman at college and became the SFI (Students' Federation of India) president of Meerut University. She later studied at Polytechnic in South Delhi. She was involved in sports activities like cycling and playing hockey, volleyball from a young age. She was also a black belt in Karate and practiced Judo. She initially worked as a security personnel in Delhi and then started a business in dining tables from R K Puram, Delhi, which later had an office at Nehru Place.

== Activism ==
Betu Singh started Sangini in 1997 to help women dealing with issues around their sexual/gender orientation and/or identity, LBT and non-identifying women. She identified as a lesbian and was in a relationship with a woman, Cath, at the time she started Sangini. They started operating a shelter home for women from Vasant Kunj in Delhi. Later she worked with her partner Maya Shanker for Sangini. They set up a helpline for women to approach them and receive counselling. They also held group meetings to discuss problems and assist those in need of help. Sangini's focus has been on emergency support and to build a lesbian community. It has also taken up issues of domestic violence against straight women and helped victims. It aids people who want to leave their homes with legal procedures and to find job interviews later. Sangini has expanded operations to in Calcutta, Bombay, and Bangalore.

=== Activities since 2000 ===
Since 2000, Sangini started visiting colleges and holding discussions to increase awareness on sexuality and about problems LBT and non-identifying women face. They started showing movies on the subject. They also started an initiative to spread awareness on safer sex at Tihar jail.

== Awards ==
Betu Singh was awarded the KASHISH Rainbow Warrior Award on May 31, 2015. She was the first posthumous recipient of the award. The award instituted in 2015 by KASHISH Mumbai International Queer Film Festival recognizes LGBTQ persons working on LGBTQ rights. Fashion designer and BJP leader Shaina NC handed the award to Betu Singh's co-worker Maya Shanker.

== Death ==
Betu Singh died at the age of 49, on October 3, 2013.
