= Shakuntala Paranjpye =

Indian actress (1906–2000)

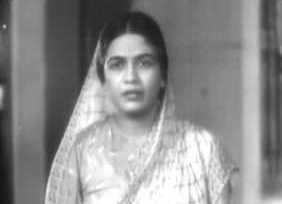

Member of Parliament, Rajya Sabha
- In office 1964–1970
- Constituency: Nominated (Arts & Cinema)

Member of Maharashtra Legislative Council
- In office 1958–1964
- Constituency: Nominated (Arts & Cinema)

Personal details
- Born: 17 January 1906
- Died: 3 May 2000 (aged 94)
- Spouse: Youra Sleptzoff (divorced)
- Children: Sai Paranjpye
- Parent: Sir R. P. Paranjpye (father)
- Education: Newnham College, Cambridge; London University
- Occupation: Writer, actress, social activist
- Awards: Padma Bhushan (1991)

Shakuntala Paranjpye (17 January 1906 – 3 May 2000) was an Indian writer, actress and a prominent social worker. She was a member of Maharashtra Legislative Council during 1958–64, and served as a nominated member of Rajya Sabha during 1964–70. In 1991, she was awarded Padma Bhushan, the third-highest civilian award in the Republic of India, as recognition of her significant contributions in colonial and post colonial period particularly pioneering work in the field of family planning.

== Biography ==
Shakuntala Paranjpye was the daughter of Sir R. P. Paranjpye, the first Indian to be Senior Wrangler at the University of Cambridge, an educationist, and India's High Commissioner to Australia during 1944–1947.

Shakuntala studied for the Mathematical Tripos at Newnham College, Cambridge, graduating in 1929. She received a Diploma in Education from London University the next year.

Shakuntala worked in the 1930s with the International Labour Organization in Geneva, Switzerland. In the 1930s and 1940s, she also acted in some Marathi and Hindi movies.

Shakuntala wrote many plays, sketches, and novels in Marathi. Some of her work was in English.

A Hindi children's movie, Yeh Hai Chakkad Bakkad Bumbe Bo, which was based on a Marathi story by Shakuntala, was released in 2003.

== Personal life ==
Shakuntala was married for a short time to a Russian painter, Youra Sleptzoff. The couple's daughter, Sai Paranjpye, was born in 1938. Soon after Sai's birth, she divorced Youra, and reared Sai in her own father's household.

Sai Paranjpye is a noted Hindi movie director and screenwriter. She is known for her comedies and children's movies. In 1991, the Government of India awarded Shakuntala the Padma Bhushan award as recognition of her significant contributions in colonial and post colonial period, particularly in family planning.

== Filmography ==
- Ganga Maiyya (1955)
- Lokshahir Ram Joshi (1947)
- Ramshastri (1944)
- Jawani Ka Rang (1941)
- Paisa (1941)
- Stree (1938)
- Duniya Na Mane (1937)
- Jeevan Jyoti (1937)
- Kunku (1937)
- Sultana Chand Biwi (1937)
- Bahadur Beti (1935)
- Kali Waghan (1935)
- Typist Girl (1935)
- Bhakta Prahlad (1934)
- Bhedi Rajkumar (1934)
- Partha Kumar (1934)
- Sairandhri (1933)

== Authorship ==
- Three years in Australia, (English), Poona, 1951
- Sense and nonsense, (English), New Delhi, Orient Longman, 1970.
- Kāhi Āmbat, Kāhi Goad, (Marathi), Pune, Śrīvidyā Prakāshan, 1979.
- Desh-Videshichyā Lok-Kathā, (Marathi)
