= 68 Pages =

- Film: '68 Pages'
- Directed by: Sridhar Rangayan
- Written by: Sridhar Rangayan, Vivek Anand
- Produced by: Humsafar Trust
- Starring: Mouli Gangulyy; Joy Sengupta; Jayati Bhatia; Zafar Karachiwala; Uday Sonawane
- Distributed by: Solaris Pictures
- Release date: 9 December 2007 (International Film Festival of Kerala)
- Running time: 92 minutes
- Country: India
- Language: Hindi

68 Pages is a 2007 Indian film about an HIV/AIDS counselor and five of her clients who are from marginalized communities. The film is directed by Sridhar Rangayan and produced by Humsafar Trust in association with Solaris Pictures. It had its world premiere at the International Film Festival of Kerala and screened at several international film festivals. It won the Silver Remi award at WorldFest Houston International Film Festival 2008, USA. The film was also screened in the Pink Ribbon Express, a National AIDS Control Organisation initiative.

The film weaves together five Mumbai-based short stories about people living with AIDS from some of the marginalised sections of society.

== Overview ==
A transsexual bar dancer, a sex worker, a gay couple tell their stories of pain, trauma, happiness and hope. 68 Pages reveals how society stigmatizes and shuns those who have HIV/AIDS, or even those who are merely different.

The film was produced with support from Department for International Development (DFID), UK. It was made as an advocacy effort to support the National AIDS Control Organisation (NACO) in National AIDS Control Programme, Phase III. This initiative decided that the female sex workers, intravenous drug users, homosexuals and transgender people will be considered core groups, and HIV projects will start at a rapid pace in the next five years to serve them. During that period the film is scheduled to screen throughout the country in an attempt to change people's attitudes about those living with HIV. The film has also been mandatory resource material for all counselor training programmes in India by NACO.

== Plot ==
Professional ethics demand that Mansi, a young counselor, maintain confidentiality, remain objective and avoid emotional attachment with her clients. As a sensitive person, she finds it difficult to remain unaffected. Her true feelings are reflected in 68 pages of her personal diary.

Her writing tells the stories of Paayal, a commercial sex worker; Nishit, an intravenous drug user; Kiran, a gay man; and Umrao, a transsexual bar dancer, who are marginalized and suffer discrimination both before and after becoming infected with HIV.

== Cast ==
- Mauli Ganguly as Mansi
- Joy Sengupta as Kiran
- Jayati Bhatia as Paayal
- Zafar Karachiwala as Nishit
- Uday Sonawane as Umesh / Umra
- Dilnaz Irani as Neha
- Bakul Thakkar

== Festivals ==
- International Film Festival of Kerala, India (December 2007)
- Pune International Film Festival, India (January 2008)
- Montage International, Kerala, India (February 2008)
- Worldfest Houston, USA (April 2008) – Winner: Silver Remi Award
- Bollywood & Beyond, Germany (July 2008)
- Nigah Queerfest, New Delhi, India (August 2008)
- Q! Film Festival, Indonesia (August 2008)
- Tasveer–Independent South Asian Film Festival ISAFF (September 2008)
- A Million Different Loves, Poland (October 2008)
- Siddharth Gautam Film Festival, Bhubaneshwar, India (December 2008)
- Translations – Seattle Transgender Film Festival, USA (May 2009)
- Ahmadabad International Film Festival, India (June 2009) – Winner: Best Film (Social Issue)
- Perspektive – Nuremberg International Human Rights Film Festival, Germany (Sept 2009)
