= Malathi Rao =

Indian writer

- Born: Bangalore, Karnataka, India
- Occupation: Writer
- Writing career
- Genre: Fiction
- Notable work: Disorderly Women
- Notable awards: Sahitya Akademi Award

Malathi Rao is an Indian writer. She won the Central Sahitya Akademi award for her English language novel Disorderly Women in 2007.

== Early life and background. ==
Malathi Rao (born April 1930) was born in Bangalore, Karnataka, to Chennagiri Padmanabha Rao and Smt. Padmavathi. She is the eldest of five sisters and has one older and two younger brothers. As a child, Rao was inspired by the works of Jane Austen, the Brontë sisters, and Louisa May Alcott. She always showed an inclination for writing and went on to study English Literature at the Universities of Bangalore and Mysore. Representing the new generation of her time, she was an educated, independent, and working woman. Rao served as a lecturer in English at Vijaya College in Bangalore, where the legendary Prof. V. T. Srinivasan was the principal and head of the department. She spent most of her teaching career in Delhi, where she taught English Literature at Miranda House, University of Delhi. Highly respected and loved by her colleagues and students, Delhi remained her home until the mid-1990s, when she returned to Bangalore to focus on her writing career.

== Works ==
Malathi Rao has written three novels, three collections of short stories and several newspaper articles. Her well-known works include "The Bridge," "...And in Benares flows the Ganga," and "Come for a Coffee... Please."

She rose to prominence with her novel 'Disorderly Women' published in 2007. She won the Sahitya Akademi Award presented by the Hon. President of India. Disorderly Women is a story of four Brahmin women in India (pre-independence) who struggle to break the barriers built around them by society.

== Publications ==
- The Bridge (novel), Chanakya Publications (Delhi, India), 1990
- Disorderly Women (novel), Dronequill Publishers (Bangalore, India), 2005
- Three collections of short stories
- Inquisition (upcoming novel)

== Awards ==
- Sahitya Akademi Award in 2007
