= Riyad Vinci Wadia =

Indian film director (1967–2003)

- Born: 19 September 1967; Bombay, India
- Died: 30 November 2003 (aged 36); Bombay, India
- Occupation: Filmmaker
- Known for: BomGay

Riyad Vinci Wadia (19 September 1967 – 30 November 2003) was an Indian independent filmmaker from Bombay, known for his short film, BOMgAY (1996), possibly the very first gay themed movie from India. Born into the filmmaking Wadia family, he inherited the production company Wadia Movietone which is known for the Fearless Nadia movies which are one of their kind in the superwoman and stunt genre when other movies of their time usually portrayed women in submissive roles. Wadia is also known for his award-winning documentary on Nadia, Fearless: The Hunterwali Story (1993), which was written about in Time magazine and made a name for Riyad at the very outset of his brief but impactful career.

== Personal life ==
Riyad was born in Bombay to Nargis and Vinci Wadia, son of the legendary filmmaker JBH Wadia who was one of the founding fathers of stunt films and mythological films in India. The latter's production firm, Wadia Movietone, which Riyad would later inherit, launched into the Indian film industry (later known as Bollywood) the Australian actress Mary Evans who was known popularly as 'Fearless Nadia'. Riyad did his schooling at Bombay International School, briefly attended St. Xavier's College, and later went to Australia to the Charles Sturt Film School in Wagga Wagga. Riyad was openly gay, and BOMgAY was India's first overtly gay-themed film.

== Recognition ==
Nicknamed as 'The Turk' of the Indian Independent cinema, Riyad's films are still being referred to in many books about Bollywood, be it gay themes in Indian Cinema, or the ones about JBH Wadia and Fearless Nadia. His first documentary, Fearless : The Hunterwali Story, which is based on the life of Mary (aka Nadia) Wadia, got screened at over 50 international film festivals, such as The Berlin International Film Festival (1994) and The London Film Festival (1993). The short film, BOMgAY, with shooting locations such as the gay cruising spots of the Victoria Terminus urinals and the Bombay local tracks along which people defecate, was described as "part Bollywood, part Genet". The film, based on the gay-themed poetry of the Poona-based R. Raj Rao, explored the underground gay subculture of Bombay and marked the entry of queer themes into Indian Cinema. The film had a limited release in India, thanks to its explicit content. It got screened at a number of international film festivals and finds mention in the research works on the history of queer themes in Indian Cinema as the first queer themed film from India.

An award has been instituted in his memory by his mother and brother at the KASHISH Mumbai International Queer Film Festival and awarded every year since 2011. The Riyad Wadia Award for Best Emerging Indian Filmmaker is given to first or second time filmmaker whose LGBTQ+ short film is being screened at the festival.

== Final years ==
Riyad tested positive for HIV in 1995. Though he was quite capable of affording the then expensive HIV medication, he refused to be on any kind of dosage. He left India shortly after the production of BOMgAY, supporting himself with petty jobs in New York and writing a regular column for The New Indian Express. Things got difficult post 9/11, with not many jobs available, forcing him to get back to Bombay. Riyad was lost to abdominal tuberculosis on 30 November 2003, in Bombay. At the time of his death, he was in the process of generating funds for his supposed first full-length film (unfinished), Naked Rain, based on R. Raj Rao's novel, Boyfriend. "He made a very important contribution to the gay cause and was one of the central figures to begin the broad-basing of the gay movement in India," says gay activist Ashok Row Kavi. The Riyad Wadia Award for Best Emerging Indian Filmmaker was instituted with funding from Wadia Movietone (through Riyad's brother Roy) in 2011 by Kashish, the noted international queer film festival held annually in Bombay.

== Works ==
- Films
  - Fearless : The Hunterwali Story (1993)
  - Bomgay (1996)
  - A Mermaid called Aida (1996)
- Writings
  - Long Life of a Short Film: The Making of BOMgAY
  - Wadia also wrote columns for The New Indian Express.
