= Breaking Free (film) =

- Directed by: Sridhar Rangayan
- Written by: Sridhar Rangayan, Saagar Gupta
- Produced by: Solaris Pictures
- Distributed by: Solaris Pictures
- Release date: 29 May 2015
- Running time: 82 minutes
- Country: India
- Language: Hindi/ English

Breaking Free is a 2015 film by Sridhar Rangayan, produced by Solaris Pictures. The film revolves around filmmaker and gay rights activist Sridhar Rangayan exposing the human rights violations faced by the LGBTQ community in India. The film was selected to be part of the Indian Panorama (non-Fiction) and screened at International Film Festival of India in 2015.

It won the Rajat Kamal National Award for Best Editing (Non-Fiction) in 2016 for its editors Pravin Angre and Sridhar Rangayan. It also won the Barbara Gittings Human Rights Award at qFLIX Philadelphia in 2016. It is currently streaming on Netflix.

== Cast ==
- Anand Grover
- Arvind Narrain
- Ashok Row Kavi
- Jaya Sharma
- Manohar Elavarthi
- Maya Sharma
- Pallav Patankar
- Shobhna Kumar
- Sridhar Rangayan
- Vivek Anand
