= Mona Ambegaonkar =

Indian film and television actress

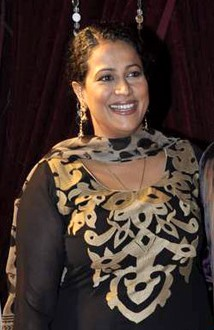
- Born: 5 March 1970 (age 56); Bombay, Maharashtra, India
- Occupation: Actress
- Children: 1

Mona Ambegaonkar (born 5 March 1970) is an Indian actress who works in Hindi films and television. She has featured in over 15 plays, 18 feature films, 38 TV projects, 37 advertising campaigns. She had a minor role in film Hazaar Chaurasi Ki Maa and medical drama Dhadkan (TV series) as Dr. Chitra.

Mona Ambegaonkar plays the lead in the 2018 Hindi feature film Evening Shadows directed by Sridhar Rangayan and produced by Solaris Pictures.

She plays the role of Vasudha, a South Indian woman who is confronted by the truth of her son Kartik (Devansh Doshi) being gay. Being from a traditional society and bound within a patriarchal family, she finds it very difficult to accept her son's sexuality. She also is scared that her strict husband Damodar (played by eminent actor Ananth Narayan Mahadevan) will find out about the truth.

She won the award for Best Performance in a Supporting Role at Out At The Movies, Winston-Salem for her role in the film Evening Shadows.

== Television ==
- Thoda sa aasman as an aspiring airhostess
- Dekh Bhai Dekh (1993) as Neeru
- Saanp-Sedhi (1994) as a co-host with Mohan Kapoor
- Kya Baat Hai (1997) as Mona
- C.I.D. (2004–2005) as Dr. Anjalika Deshmukh
- Aahat (1995–2001) as episodic role
  - Episode 1.18-1.19 (1995) as Karuna
  - Episode 1.108-1.109 (1997) as Raksha
  - Episode 1.132-1.133 (1998) as Shilpa
  - Episode 1.176-1.177 (1999) as Anju
  - Episode 1.268-1.269 (2001) as Reena
- Dhadkan as Dr. Chitra Sheshadri
- Nyaay (1999–2000) as Advocate Varsha
- Rishtey (TV series) as Various Characters
- Shubh Mangal Savadhan (2003) as Maria
- Maryada: Lekin Kab Tak
- Amber Dhara (2007–2008) as Lata, Amber & Dhara's mother
- Kaala Teeka as Kalyani Jha (main antagonist)
- Baat Hamari Pakki Hai as Usha Sharma
- Life Sahi Hai (2016–2018) as Jasjit's mother

== Filmography ==
=== Films ===
| Year | Title | Role |
|---|---|---|
| 1990 | Zakhmi Zameen | Mona Singh (Thakur's daughter) |
| 1991 | Baharon Ke Manzil | Asha |
| 1993 | Bonnie | |
| 1995 | Kala Sach | Pooja Desai / Kavita |
| 1997 | Mrityudand | Special Appearance |
| | Chirantan | |
| 1998 | Hazaar Chaurasi Ki Maa | Binny |
| 1999 | Bindhaast | ACP Nisha Velankar |
| 2000 | Phir Bhi Dil Hai Hindustani | Shalini (Ajay Bakshi's crush) |
| 2000 | Dead End (TV movie) | |
| 2003 | Yeh Hai Chakkad Bakkad Bumbe Bo | |
| 2003 | Raja Dil Ka Ghulam | Cameo appearance |
| | Shafaq | |
| 2003 | Bakra | |
| 2004 | White Noise | |
| 2004 | I - Proud to Be an Indian | Kamal Gill , I's sister-in-law |
| 2005 | Mangal Pandey: The Rising | Kamla |
| 2007 | Buddha Mar Gaya | |
| 2007 | Gandhi, My Father | Prostitute |
| 2008 | Hijack | Simone |
| 2012 | Cheeka, the crier | |
| 2014 | Super Nani | |
| 2014 | Mardaani | Meenu Rastogi, Karan's mother |
| 2015 | Pyaar Ka Punchnama 2 | Supriya's mother |
| 2016 | Dishoom | Gayatri Shubha Mishra, Indian Minister of External Affairs |
| 2017 | Secret Superstar | Advocate Sheena |
| 2018 | Evening Shadows | Vasudha |
| 2020 | Bhaag Beanie Bhaag | Beanie's mother |
| 2022 | Tara Vs Bilal | Farzana, Bilal Khan's mother |
| 2026 | Do Deewane Seher Mein | |

=== Web series ===
| Year | Title | Role | Platform | Notes |
|---|---|---|---|---|
| 2019 | M.O.M. - Mission Over Mars | Sunita Vyas | ALTBalaji, ZEE5 | |
