= ISAFF =

Independent film festival for South Asian countries and their diasporas

Independent South Asian Film Festival (ISAFF)
- Location: Seattle, Washington
- Website: http://tasveer.org/tasveer.org/isaff/index.html

ISAFF (Independent South Asian Film Festival) is an annual film festival dedicated to showing Independent films connected to South Asia(Afghanistan, Bangladesh, Bhutan, India, Maldives, Nepal, Pakistan, Sri Lanka, Tibet) and the South Asian diaspora across the world. The film festival is celebrated annually in the month of October in Seattle Since its small beginning in 2002, it has grown in size and variety. It comprises two main sections- feature-length and short films covering drama and documentary films.

The 6th ISAFF, featuring approximately 20 independent films, as well as musicians and artists, took place October 2–4, 2009 at the Broadway Performance Hall, Seattle. The program was directed by Rita Meher.

== History ==
=== ISAFF ===
ISAFF held its first major event in September 2004 to showcase new work by South-Asian filmmakers. South-Asia, covers Afghanistan, Bangladesh, Bhutan, India, Maldives, Nepal, Pakistan, Sri Lanka, Tibet and the various South-Asian diaspora across the world. It has been viewed as an opportunity to view alternatives to the commercial offerings of Bollywood. The festival is aimed at creating an environment for conversation, education, and exploration of issues that face South Asia and its Diaspora through film screening, panel discussions, workshops, and cultural programming. The film is hosted by Seattle's non-profit organization, Tasveer.

ISAFF got its start through Farah Nousheen and Rita Meher. They founded Tasveer in March 2002 in Seattle, Washington. The idea of Tasveer was born after they attended a South Asian Women's festival in San Francisco in November 2001. They wanted to bring this enriching experience to their home, Seattle. Tasveer's first screening was held at Elliott Bay Book Company on the occasion of Gay Pride weekend that summer. Since then, ISAFF has screened over 200 films at numerous venues throughout Seattle. Tasveer was incorporated as a non profit organization in March 2004
