= Bomgay =

- Directed by: Riyad Vinci Wadia, Jangu Sethna
- Written by: Riyad Vinci Wadia, R. Raj Rao
- Starring: Rahul Bose, Kushal Punjabi and Tarun Shahani
- Narrated by: Rajit Kapur
- Cinematography: Tejal Patni
- Music by: Ashutosh Phatak
- Production company: Wadia Movietone
- Release date: 22 December 1996 (India)
- Running time: 12 minutes
- Country: India
- Language: English

Bomgay is a 1996 Indian anthology of short films directed by Riyad Vinci Wadia and Jangu Sethna. The film stars Kushal Punjabi and Rahul Bose with music by Ashutosh Phatak. It is often regarded as India's first gay film and is known for its gay sex scene in a library. Bomgay consists of six segments, each based on a poem by Indian writer R. Raj Rao.

== Segments ==
- "Opinions"
- "Underground"
- "Lefty"
- "E unema no"
- "Bomgay"
- "Friends"

== Cast ==
- Rahul Bose as The Lefty
- Kushal Punjabi as The Sodomiser
- Tarun Shahani as Enema Boy
- R. Raj Rao as The Opinionated
- Farud Cambata as Bombay Dost
- Freddy Firoze as Muthree Rani
- Eric Rosenbaumm as Sex Tourist

== Production ==
In 1995 Riyad Vinci Wadia, having released his debut film Fearless, decided to make a film based on gay culture in Bombay. He read R. Raj Rao's poetry collection One Day I Locked My Flat in Soul City and invited him to collaborate on a film script with him. It was difficult to find funding for the film in India, so the project was temporarily put on hold until Wadia read Rao's newest work, a collection of poems called "Bomgay". He decided to make a low-budget short film based on the poems. As "Bomgay" had a limited budget of Rs. 500,000, Wadia planned to use friends from the gay community to help keep costs down. He discovered that this was difficult as people were afraid of being outed if they worked on the film, so he enlisted the help of his friends from the Bombay advertising industry instead. Wadia secured Rahul Bose for the lead role. The film was shot in Bombay with scenes taking place in railroad cars shot guerrilla style. In order to shoot footage of a gay sex scene, the crew pretended that they were making a public service film on ragging. The film was not released commercially in India as Wadia did not submit it to the Censor Board, believing that they would refuse it a certificate.
