= Anant Mahadevan =

Indian screenwriter, actor, and filmmaker (born 1950)

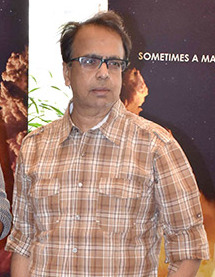
- Mahadevan in 2019
- Born: Ananth Narayan Mahadevan; 27 October 1960 (age 65); Thrissur, Travancore–Cochin, India
- Occupations: Filmmaker; actor
- Years active: 1984–present

Ananth Narayan Mahadevan (born 27 October 1960) is an Indian film director, screenwriter, poet and an actor.

== Career ==
Anant along with Sanjay Pawar received the National Film Award (2010) for the Best Screenplay and Dialogues for the Marathi film Mee Sindhutai Sapkal. The film also fetched him the special jury award there.

Anant Mahadevan's film Gour Hari Dastaan was part of the Indian Panorama at the International Film Festival of India (2014) Goa, at the International Film Festival of Kerala IFFK (2014), the International Film Festival of Bangalore, and at the International Film Festival of Chennai (2014).

He plays the role of a strict patriarch who has his set opinions and wants other members in his family - his wife Vasudha (Mona Ambegaonkar), sister Sarita (Yamini Singh) and son Kartik (Devansh Doshi) - to obey his commands. He further acted in the 2023 film Mission Raniganj.

== Filmography ==
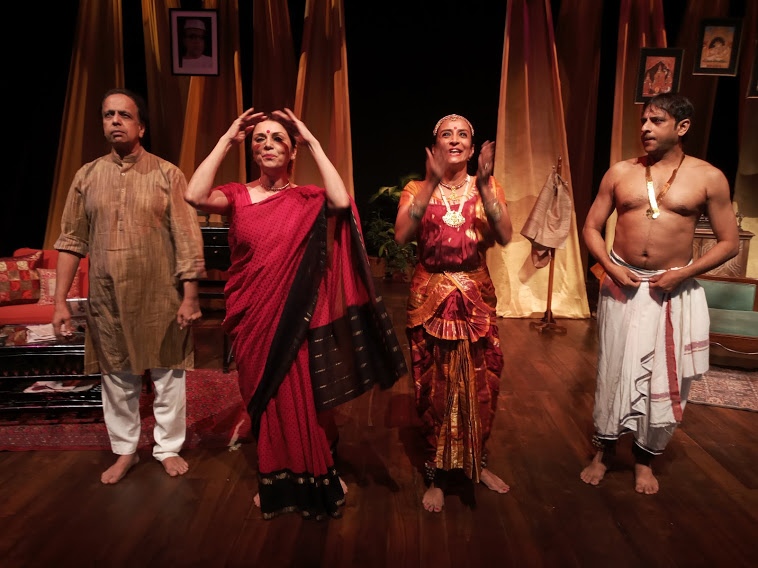
"Dance like a Man" performance with cast, Ananth Mahadevan, Lillete Dubey, Suchitra Pillai & Joy Sengupta, at Prithvi Theatre, 2021.

=== Films ===
Year	Title	Director	Screenwriter	Producer	Editor	Notes
1999	Ghoonghat Ke Pat Khol	Yes	Yes	No	No	Television film
2002	Dil Vil Pyar Vyar	Yes	No	No	No	
2004	Dil Maange More	Yes	Yes	No	No	Co-written with Javed Siddiqui, Kiran Kotrial
2006	Aksar	Yes	Yes	No	No	
2007	Aggar: Passion Betrayal Terror	Yes	No	No	No	
2007	Victoria No. 203: Diamonds Are Forever	Yes	No	No	No	
2008	Anamika: The Untold Story	Yes	Yes	No	No	
2009	Red Alert: The War Within	Yes	Yes	No	No	
2010	Mee Sindhutai Sapkal	Yes	Yes	No	Yes	Marathi film
2012	Staying Alive	Yes	No	No	No	
2014	The Xposé	Yes	No	No	No	
2015	Gour Hari Dastaan	Yes	No	No	No	
2016	Rough Book	Yes	Yes	No	No	
2016	Doctor Rakhmabai	Yes	No	No	Yes	Marathi film
2017	Aksar 2	Yes	No	No	No	
2020	Bittersweet	Yes	Yes	No	Yes	Marathi film
2020	The Knocker	Yes	Yes	No	No	short film; also cinematographer
2022	Life's Good	Yes	No	No	No	Filmed in 2011
2022	Rocketry: The Nambi Effect	No	Additional	No	No	
2022	The Storyteller	Yes	Additional	No	No	
2024	Aata Vel Zaali	Yes	Yes	Yes	Yes	Marathi film; co-edited with Kush Tripathy; also casting director
2025	Phule	Yes	Yes	No	No	

==== Acting credits ====
Year	Films	Role	Notes
1985	Khandaan	Subbu	
1986	Mazhe Ghar Mazha Sansar	Chintamani	Marathi Film
1988	Isabella	Ananthu	
1989	Chandni	Chandni's friend's husband	
1991	Vishkanya	Bajrang	
1992	Nagin Aur Lootere	Nagraj	
1992	Khiladi	Neelam's Uncle	
1993	Professor Ki Padosan	Vaidyaji	
1993	Gardish	Havaldar Sawant	
1993	Baazigar	Vishwanath Sharma	
1993	Bedardi	Professor Harish Thakkar	
1993	Bhookamp	Akhtar	
1993	Kanoon	Pasha Polyster	
1994	Gangster		
1994	Prem Yog		
1995	God and Gun		
1995	Janam Kundli	Pandit Dindayal Shastri	
1995	Gaddaar	Mr. Saxena	
1995	Hum Dono		
1995	Akele Hum Akele Tum		
1996	Vijeta	Inquiry Officer	
1997	Yes Boss		
1997	Ishq	Brijesh Lal Saxena	
1998	Miss 420		
1998	Pyaar To Hona Hi Tha		
1998	Kudrat	Police Inspector	
1999	Dil Kya Kare	DCP Krishan Kumar	
1999	Mann	Creditor	
1999	Baadshah	Mahender Seth	
2000	Rhythm	Temple Priest	Tamil film
2004	Shikaar		
2004	Chhupa Rustam	Mr. Chinoy	
2001	Kyo Kii... Main Jhuth Nahin Bolta	Anand Mhatre	
2002	Tum Se Achcha Kaun Hai	Sunil Madhavan	
2003	Satta		
2003	Joggers' Park		
2006	Sandwich	Mr. Rao	
2007	Aap Kaa Surroor	News Reporter	
2007	Victoria No. 203: Diamonds Are Forever	Film Director	
2008	Rafoo Chakkar: Fun on the Run	Harbans Singh	
2008	EMI	Babu	
2009	8 x 10 Tasveer	Sundar Puri	
2010	Na Ghar Ke Na Ghaat Ke	V.G Chunawala	
2012	Staying Alive		
2014	The Xposé	Subba Prasad	Also director
2015	Papanasam	Prabhakar	Tamil film
2017	Kaccha Limbu	Venkatesh	
2018	Vishwaroopam 2	Eshwar Iyer	Bilingual film
2018	Evening Shadows	Damodar	
2018	2.0	Scientist	Tamil film
2020	Scam 1992	S. Venkitaramanan, RBI Governor	
2020	Durgamati	Psychiatrist	
2021	Kaadan	Kurunjinathan/ Kanakamedala Raja Gopalam/ Jagannath Sevak	Trilingual film
2022	Forensic	Dr. Rajeev Gupta	
2022	Salaam Venky	Guruji	
2023	Mission Raniganj	PM Natarajan	
2024	Ameena	Aftab Hasnain	
2025	Sikandar	Chief Minister	
2025	Ek Deewane Ki Deewaniyat	Adaa's Father	
TBA	3 Monkeys		
2026	Daldal on Prime	Manohar Swamy	

=== Television ===
Year	Title	Role	Notes
1990	The Sword of Tipu Sultan	Pandit Purnaiah	
1994	Dekh Bhai Dekh		
1994	Junoon	Advocate Vrinal Modi	
1997	Ghar Jamai	—N/a	Director and writer only
1997–1998	Zabaan Sambhalke		
1998	Jaal	—N/a	Director only
2000	Alvida Darling	—N/a	Director only
2001	Dial 100	—N/a	Director only
2001	Kabhi To Milenge	Dr. Praful	Also director
2002	Devi	—N/a	Director only
2009	Ghar Ki Baat Hai	—N/a	Director only
2010	Ishaan: Sapno Ko Awaaz De	—N/a	Director only
2012	Lakhon Mein EK	—N/a	Director only
2017–2018	Aadat Se Majboor	Roshan Lal Tootejaa	
2020	Mere Sai	Bal Gangadhar Tilak	
2020–2022	Avrodh: The Siege Within	Satish Mahadevan	
2026	Daldal	Manohar Swamy	

== Theatre ==
Anant Mahadevan has been associated with theatre since the late 1970s, beginning with a performance as Polonius in a stage production of Hamlet.

He later appeared in the satirical play Blame It on Yashraj, written and directed by Bharat Dabholkar.

In 2019, Mahadevan appeared in the stage play Patte Khul Gaye, produced by Rahul Bhuchar under the banner of Felicity Theatre. The play explored themes of social behaviour and smartphone addiction.

== Bibliography ==
- Once Upon A Prime Time, My Journey On Indian Television. Embassy Books. 20 July 2020. ISBN 9789388247726.
