= Humsafar Trust =

Non-governmental organization

- Founded: 1994
- Founder: Ashok Row Kavi, Suhail Abbasi, Sridhar Rangayan
- Type: Charitable trust
- Purpose: LGBT rights, health
- Location: Mumbai, India
- Key people: Suhail Abbasi (chairperson); Vivek Raj Anand (CEO)
- Website: https://humsafar.org/about-us/

Humsafar Trust (humsafar meaning 'companion' in Hindustani: Hindi: हमसफ़र, Urdu: ہمسفر) is an NGO in Mumbai that promotes LGBT rights. Founded by Ashok Row Kavi, Suhail Abbasi, and Sridhar Rangayan in 1994, it is one of the largest and most active of such organisations in India. It provides counselling, advocacy and healthcare to LGBT communities and has helped reduce violence, discrimination and stigma against them. Humsafar Trust is the convenor member of Integrated Network for Sexual Minorities (INFOSEM).

== Origin ==
The Humsafar Trust (HST) was founded in April 1994 by journalist Ashok Row Kavi, media professional Suhail Abbasi and filmmaker Sridhar Rangayan, to reach out to LGBTQ communities in Mumbai Metro and surrounding areas. At that time prejudice and conventional Indian societal values prevented MSM and transgender Indians from getting effective health services. The initial focus of Humsafar Trust was on activism for providing HIV/AIDS health services to gay men, but soon expanded to provide guidance, checkups, hospital referrals, confidential HIV testing, counseling and outreach for the complete spectrum of the LGBT community.

== Advocacy initiatives ==
- Humsafar Trust produced feature film 68 Pages documenting experiences of a counsellor working with marginalised communities in 2007.
- Produced Bridges of Hope, a documentary documenting voices and concerns of MSM and TG community in 2004.
- Produced Yehi Hai...Right way, a condom demonstration film for MSM and Transgender.
- Humsafar Trust was the primary organiser of Project Bolo, an Indian LGBT oral history project funded by the United Nations Development Programme.
- Supported Kashish Mumbai International Film Festival in 2010
- First performance of Ek Madhavbaug - Chetan Datar's poignant Marathi play about a son coming out to his mother, had its first Hindi performance in 2010 by actor Mona Ambegaonkar. There have been multiple performances of this play with support of Humsafar Trust at various platforms including corporates and educational institutes.
- Co-produced feature film I AM OMAR in collaboration with Anti Clock Films, and ONIR, a film that brings to light harassment faced by the gay community
- Developed recommendation language manual for print and electronic media for correct reporting on LGBT issues - SANCHAR
- Developed Mission Azaadi Document, a reference manual to promote LGBTQH rights in India supported by International HIV/AIDS Alliance
- Launched the initiative LIKHO to nurture budding journalists and media persons in the LGBTQ community.
- Humsafar Trust and Tinder joined to bring more gender/sexual inclusivity to the social dating platform so that the LGBTQI+ community can express themselves freely. By this initiative Tinder added 23 gender options for users.

== Initiatives by Humsafar Trust ==
Convenor member of INFOSEM

HST is a convener member of Integrated Network for Sexual Minorities (INFOSEM), the only national level network of sexual minorities that has 196 community based organisations representing lesbian, gay, kothi, MSM, bisexual and transgender communities as members.

Yaariyan & Umang

HST has nurtured the support group Umang (Joy) for LBT persons and the youth LGBT group Yaariyan (Friendships). Both the groups are actively involved in engaging with young members of the community and undertake a number of community-binding and advocacy related initiatives. Yaariyan has been doing LGBTQ flashmob in Mumbai for many years.

Sanjeevani

Humsafar has nurtured Sanjeevani, a support group for people living with HIV. Sanjeevani was established in March 2003 and registered in March 2010 as a CBO of men who have sex with men (MSM) and transgender (TG) living with HIV. It has been a support group of over 300 individuals living with HIV.

Humsafar Connect

HST has set up Connect, a national online resource center that will connect LGBTQ communities worldwide.

HIV/AIDS ART Clinic

The Humsafar Trust inaugurated India's first integrated community-based HIV treatment centre and clinic in Mumbai to provide free counselling and anti-retroviral therapy (ART). It has been set up with the help of Mumbai District State AIDS Control Society (MDACS) and FHI 360. The community-based ART centre is a pilot differentiated care supported by the government of India.

"This centre can now diagnose, provide the pills, carry out testing and assessment and provide counselling and ART therapy all under one roof." - Ashok Row Kavi, founder of Humsafar Trust.

The aim is to relieve the government hospitals from the constant inflow of HIV/AIDS MSM patients.

== Activism ==
- Humsafar Trust organises an LGBT film festival in Mumbai.
- Humsafar Trust has supported the organisation of flash mobs to protest.
- In January 2012 Humsafar Trust director Vivek Anand filed a complaint on behalf of attendees at an LGBT fundraiser which was targeted by a protester and police.
- In August 2018, Humsafar Trust, in collaboration with the Canadian consulate hosted the Emerging Queer Leaders (EQueL) Summit in Mumbai.
- Publicis.Sapient in partnership with HST Launched a short film, #PeopleNotLabels to create awareness for trans people in Indian Society.

== Humsafar Delhi ==
Humsafar Trust has also started an office in the capital of India - New Delhi. It also has a drop-in centre where people can meet, engage and discuss.

"The Humsafar Trust will bring our best services in counselling, crisis management and community mobilisation to the LGBT groups in Delhi-NCR and other nearby areas. We also hope to network directly with the Parliament and the Union government on important legislation regarding sexual minorities and their problems." - Ashok Row Kavi, founder of Humsafar Trust.

"Humsafar's LGBTQ centre in Delhi hopes to provide not only a safer place for the community members, but also counselling and links with mental health professionals." - Vivek Anand, CEO of Humsafar Trust.

== See also ==
- LGBT rights in India
