= Public Service Broadcasting Trust =

Indian non-governmental organization

- Abbreviation: PSBT
- Formation: 2000
- Type: Non-governmental organization
- Purpose: Support for independent documentary filmmaking
- Headquarters: New Delhi, India
- Location: India
- Region served: India
- Official language: English, Hindi
- Managing Trustee: Rajiv Mehrotra
- Main organ: Open Frame Film Festival
- Website: PSBT.org

The Public Service Broadcasting Trust is an Indian non-governmental organisation. It helps independent documentary film-makers to work free from commercial and political pressures. It hosts the annual Open Frame film festival in New Delhi.

== Open Frame festival ==
The Public Service Broadcasting Trust (PSBT) annually hosts the Open Frame film festival and forum, dedicated to fostering a meaningful discourse on contemporary issues through the exploration of documentary films from India and around the world. As a not-for-profit trust, PSBT commissions independent documentary filmmakers nationwide, resulting in over 700 films covering diverse themes such as gender, democracy, labor, diversity, livelihood, human rights, and conflict.
