= Toxic (2026 film) =

2026 Indian film by Geetu Mohandas

- Theatrical release poster
- Directed by: Geetu Mohandas
- Written by: Geetu Mohandas; Yash
- Story by: Geetu Mohandas
- Produced by: Venkat K. Narayana; Yash
- Starring: Yash; Kiara Advani; Nayanthara; Huma Qureshi; Tara Sutaria; Rukmini Vasanth
- Cinematography: Rajeev Ravi
- Edited by: Ujwal Kulkarni
- Music by: Songs: Vishal Mishra; Ravi Basrur; Tanishk Bagchi; Faheem Abdullah; Arslan Nizami; Score: Ravi Basrur
- Production companies: KVN Productions; Monster Mind Creations
- Distributed by: see below
- Release date: 26 August 2026
- Running time: 194 minutes
- Country: India
- Languages: Kannada; English
- Budget: est. ₹500–₹1,000 crore (Note: Quoting India Today, "As per reports, budget estimates [for the film, Toxic] have varied dramatically, from around Rs 500 crore to close to Rs 1,000 crore.": NDTV and The Hollywood Reporter India have reported the budget as ₹500 crore.; Asianet News, NTV Telugu, Navbharat Times and The Indian Express have reported the budget as around ₹600 crore.; Asianet News later on reported the budget between ₹600–700 crore.; Hindustan Times has reported the budget between ₹700–800 crore.; Mint has reported the budget between ₹800–₹850 crore.; Zoom TV has reported the budget between ₹850–1000 crore.; Variety India has reported the budget as ₹1,000 crore.)
- Box office: ₹320–341.39 crore

Toxic: A Fairy Tale for Grown-Ups is a 2026 Indian psychological thriller Gangster Film (Note: Udayavani reported the genre as psychological thriller.; The Times of India reported the genre as a gangster film.) directed by Geetu Mohandas and jointly produced by Venkat K. Narayana and Yash through KVN Productions and Monster Mind Creations respectively. It stars Yash in a dual role to split personality as Raya / Ticket, alongside Kiara Advani, Nayanthara, Huma Qureshi, Tara Sutaria, and Rukmini Vasanth.

The film was officially announced in December 2023 under the tentative title Yash 19, as it is the 19th film of Yash as a leading actor, with the official title revealed a few days later. The film is reportedly budgeted at ₹500–1000 crore, making it one of the most expensive Indian films ever made. Principal photography took place from August 2024 to October 2025 across Bengaluru, Mumbai, Goa, Thoothukudi and Jaipur simultaneously shot in Kannada and English.

Toxic was released worldwide on 26 August 2026. The film received mostly negative reviews from critics, (Note: Quoting NDTV, "Toxic has received mostly negative reviews from critics and audiences in its early response."; Quoting The Free Press Journal, "The film received mostly negative reviews from critics and the audience, and it is being trolled on social media."; Quoting Wion, "However, the film opened to mostly negative reviews from critics.) who criticised its screenplay, pacing, themes, substance abuse, sexual content and excessive violence, though the performances (particularly of Yash and Kiara) and action sequences received some praise.

Despite the film becoming the ninth highest-grossing Indian film of 2026 and fourth highest-grossing Kannada film of all-time, the film was a massive box-office bomb, grossing ₹320 crore (US$34 million)–₹341.39 crore (US$36 million) against an estimated production budget of ₹500 crore (US$53 million) to ₹1,000 crore (US$110 million).

== Plot ==
The film follows Raya, a gangster in pre-independence Goa, under Portuguese rule. In the 1920s, his mother kills his father, leaving his elder sister, Ganga, to raise him. In 1947, Raya and Ganga avenge their father's death by killing gangster Fernandez Almeida, then begin working for his brother, Salvador Almeida. Raya eventually becomes a notorious and ruthless underworld figure and enters a relationship with Salvador's daughter, Rebecca. His growing power, however, provokes the jealousy of Salvador's mistress, Elizabeth, and her brother, Tony. During a visit to a circus, Raya is attacked by assassins disguised as clowns and meets its popular performer, Nadia. After killing the attackers, he investigates the assassination attempt and, with Nadia's help, discovers Tony's involvement. Tony takes responsibility to protect Elizabeth, who is forced to kill him as a test of loyalty in front of Raya, Ganga and Salvador.

Raya falls in love with Nadia, beginning a relationship that strains his bond with Rebecca. Salvador and Ganga urge him to marry Rebecca and abandon Nadia, and he reluctantly agrees. On his wedding night, however, Raya learns that Nadia is pregnant with his child and that Salvador intends to kill them. Raya kills Salvador, but Rebecca shoots him during the ensuing gunfight, prompting Ganga to kill Rebecca. Raya escapes with the help of his friend Karmadi, while Ganga sacrifices herself to secure his escape. Seeking revenge, Elizabeth forces Nadia to kill Ganga, destroying Nadia and Raya's relationship. Raya kills Elizabeth but, devastated by Ganga's death, leaves Goa, abandoning Nadia and their son, Ticket. Nadia subsequently spirals into despair.

Years later, following the Portuguese withdrawal from Goa in the 1960s, Raya returns from expanding his criminal operations overseas, including in Macau. He visits Nadia's circus but refuses to see her, prompting her to commit suicide. Raya then takes Ticket for a drive but, while drunk, accidentally drives off a cliff into the sea. Although he saves his son, his distressed behaviour frightens Ticket away.

Raya continues to expand his criminal empire while deteriorating emotionally. He eventually meets Melissa and marries her. On the day she gives birth to their son, Adam, Raya is attacked by assassins, one of whom appears to be Ticket, seeking revenge for his father's past actions. As an adult, Ticket begins systematically destroying Raya's businesses and turns his father's ally, Xian Wei King, against him by killing King's son. On Christmas Eve, Ticket breaks into Raya's house, prompting Melissa to leave with Adam. Raya attempts to stop them, but Ticket captures both father and son and tries to kill them. Raya overpowers Ticket but spares his life. Later, the two argue bitterly, with Ticket confronting Raya over his mistakes and the suffering he has inflicted on those around him.

Overcome with anger and guilt, Raya urges Ticket to kill him, but Ticket refuses. The following morning, Melissa arrives with the police to retrieve Adam. Raya and Ticket briefly unite to fight the police, and Raya attempts to escape with Adam. When Ticket tries to reconcile with his father, Raya tells him to leave and asks his name. Enraged, Ticket shoots Raya in the head. It is then revealed that Raya and Ticket are the same person: Ticket is a split personality created by Raya, while the real Ticket died in the car accident years earlier after Raya failed to save him.

Realising the truth, Raya sends Adam away with Melissa before experiencing hallucinations of his deceased loved ones. He joins a battle between his men and Xian Wei King's forces, seeking revenge for King's son, whom he killed while acting as Ticket. Karmadi and Raya's remaining men are killed. Still hallucinating, Raya fights alone, shoots down King's plane, killing him, and triggers an avalanche that sweeps away the remaining enemy forces. As the avalanche approaches, Raya sees a hallucination of young Ticket and kneels to embrace him, leaving his ultimate fate unknown.

== Cast ==
- Yash as Raya / Ticket (Note: Yash portrayed a single character, Raya, who has a split personality manifested as his son, Ticket.) (Dual role to Split personality)
  - Krishiv Jindal as Young Raya
- Kiara Advani as Nadia, Rumi alias Ticket's mother, Raya's ex-lover
- Nayanthara as Ganga, Raya's elder sister
  - Aarohi Patel as Young Ganga
  - Diyara Valecha as Kid Ganga
- Huma Qureshi as Elizabeth, Salvador's mistress
- Tara Sutaria as Rebecca Almeida, Salvador's daughter, Raya's ex-fiancée
- Rukmini Vasanth as Melissa, Adam's mother, Raya's lover turned wife
- Akshay Oberoi as Tony, Elizabeth's brother
- Darrell D'Silva as Salvador Almeida
- Sudev Nair as Karmadi, Raya's friend
- Balaji Manohar as Bheera, Raya's friend
- Sanjeeda Sheikh as Kamala, Raya and Ganga's mother (special appearance)
- Kabir Pahwa as Rumi alias Ticket, Nadia's son
- Mikail Rao Khan as Adam, Melissa's son
- Kyle Paul as Fernandez Almeida
- Steve Yap as Xian Wei King
- Surjith Gopinath as a drunken car driver
- Habib Al Aidroos as Robert
- Randhir Verma as Firdaus
- Benedict Garrett as Pedro
- Beatriz Taufenbach as a prostitute

== Production ==
=== Development ===
In April 2023, Yash was reported to be preparing his next film after the KGF film franchise (2018–present) with Geetu Mohandas. The project was being referred to as Yash 19, meaning Yash's 19th film as a lead actor. Reports said Geetu was developing it as her next directorial project and the two had committed to the collaboration. Some reports at the time claimed filming could begin in June 2023, but that schedule did not materialise. Geethu described her next film as a gangster drama film with a female perspective and explained that, for the first time, she was working with a writing room rather than writing alone. In late September 2023, Hollywood action choreographer J. J. Perry posted a photograph on Instagram with himself and Yash, hinting at a possible collaboration. The project was officially unveiled on 8 December 2023. KVN Productions and Yash's Monster Mind Creations were announced as production partners, with Geethu Mohandas confirmed as director. The title announcement revealed the original release date, 10 April 2025.

In January 2024, cinematographer Rajeev Ravi was announced as part of the film's technical crew. In January 2025, Geetu stated that Yash was also part of the film's writing team. Toxic is reportedly budgeted at ₹500–1,000 crore, making it one of the most expensive Indian films ever made.

=== Casting ===
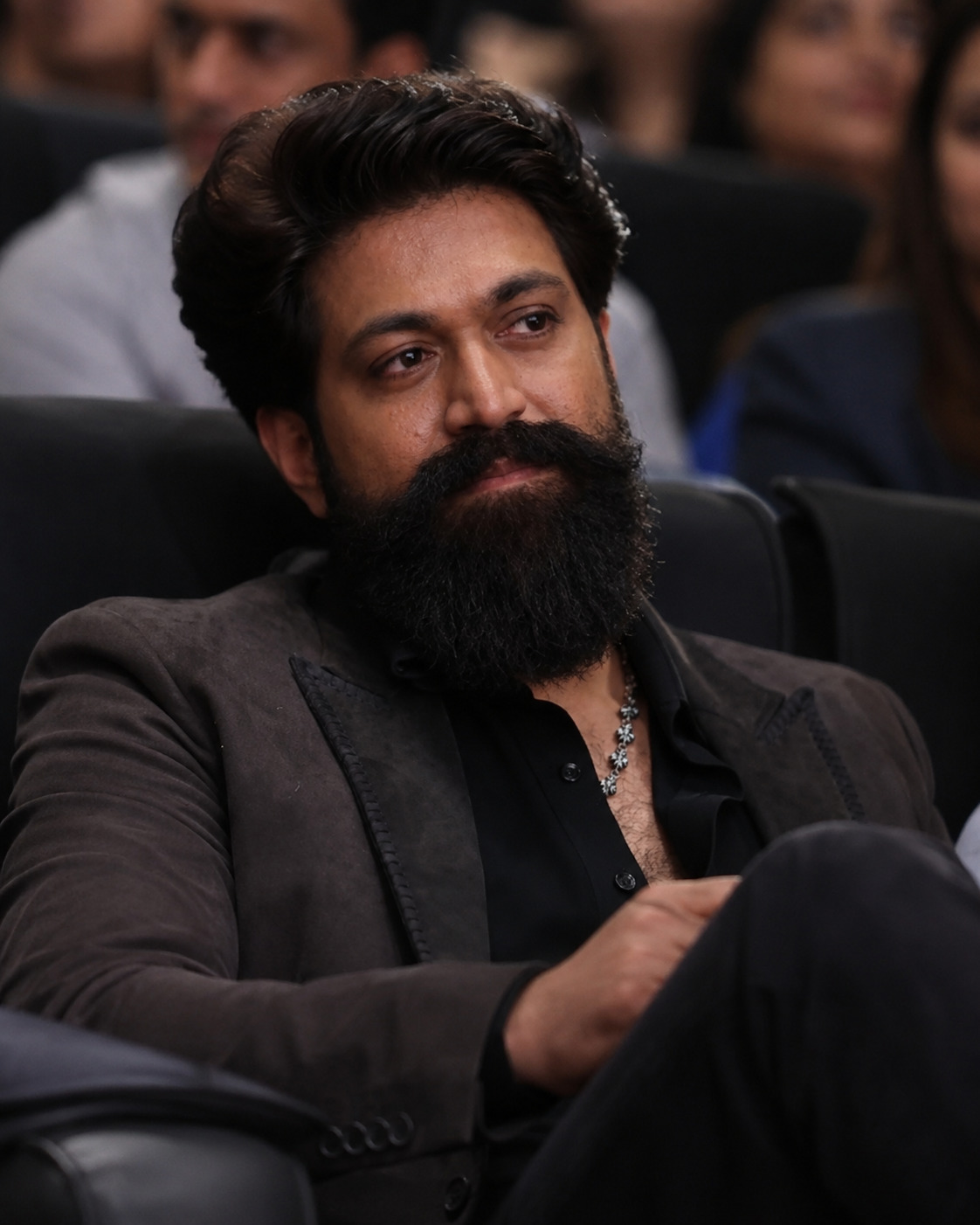
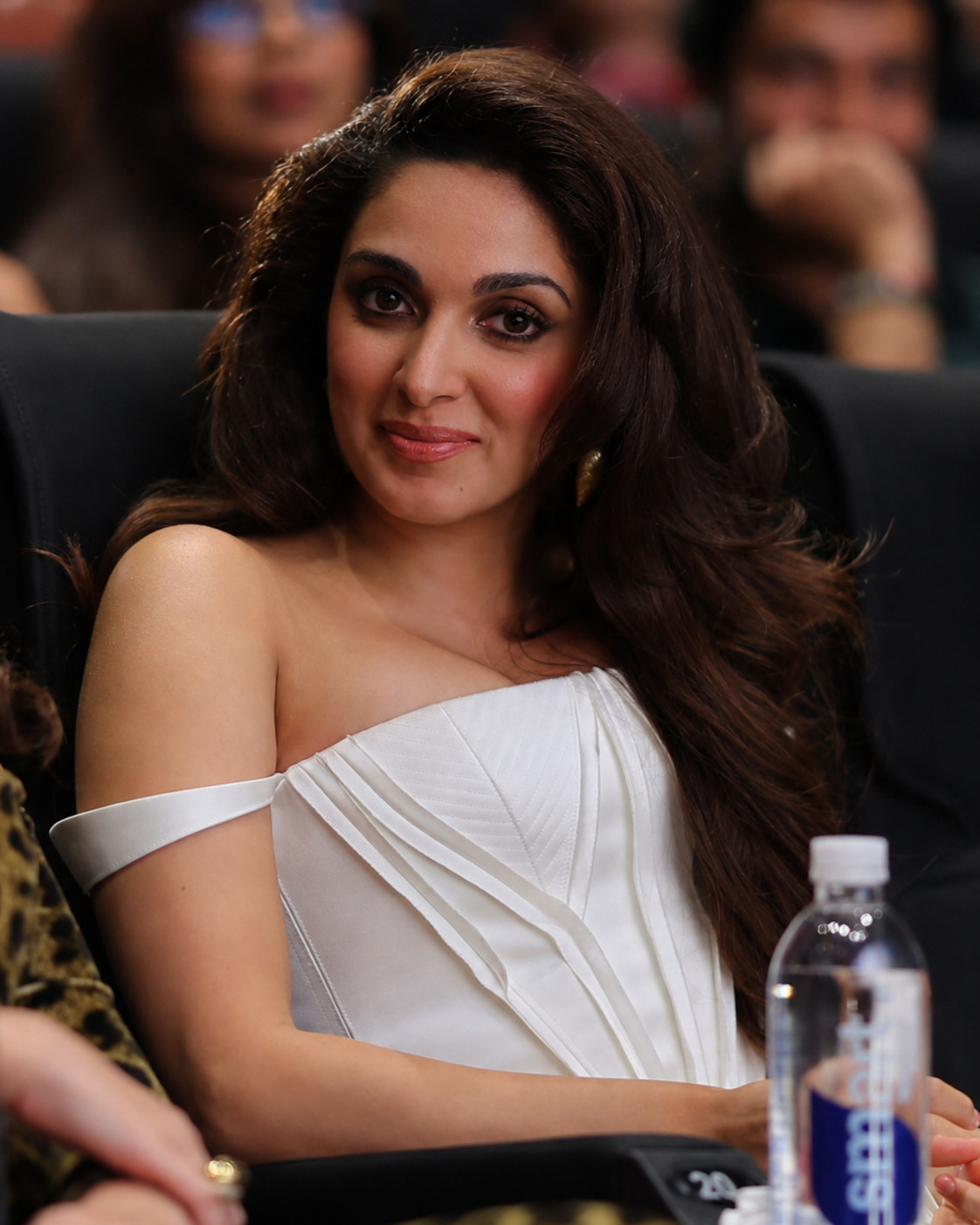
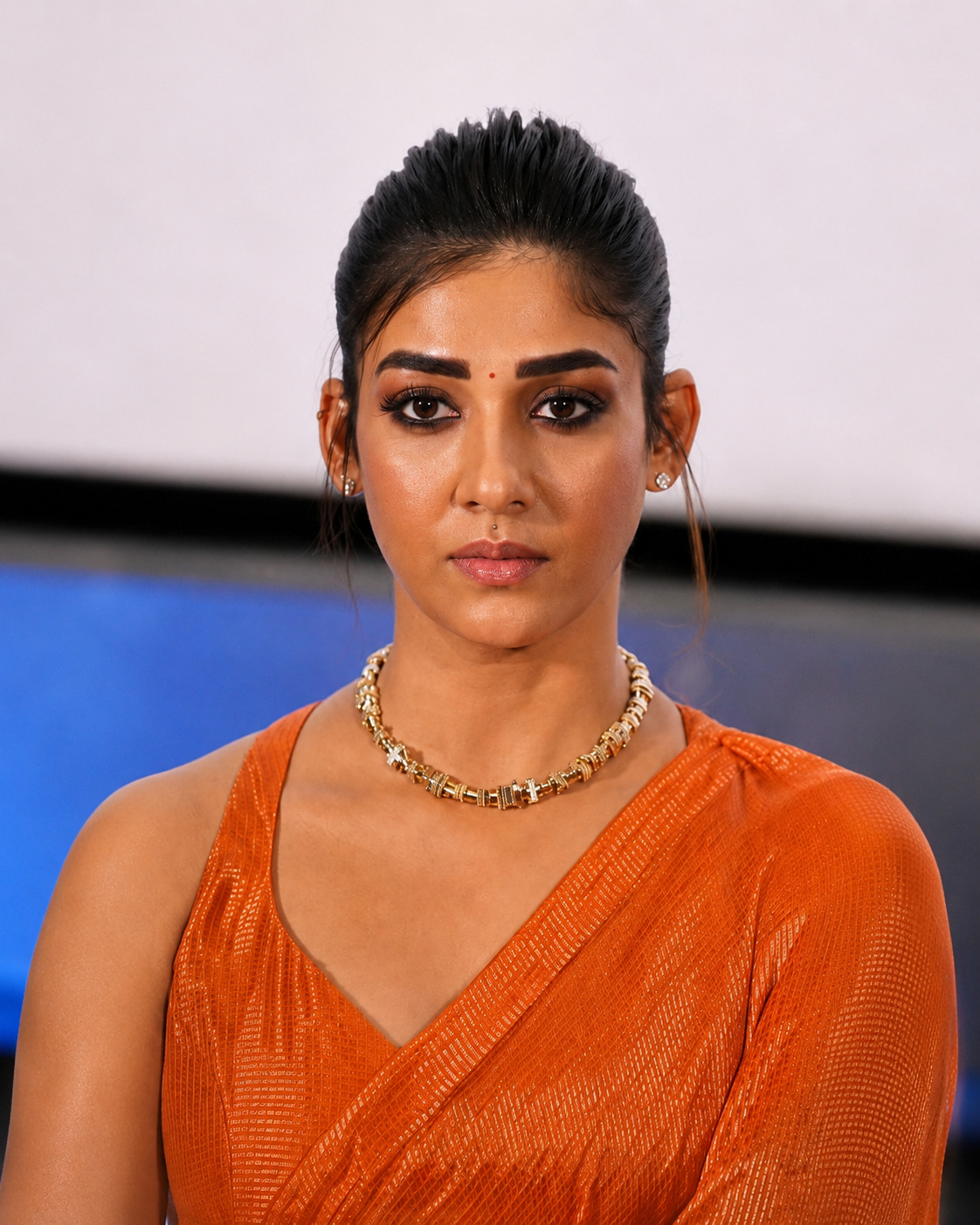
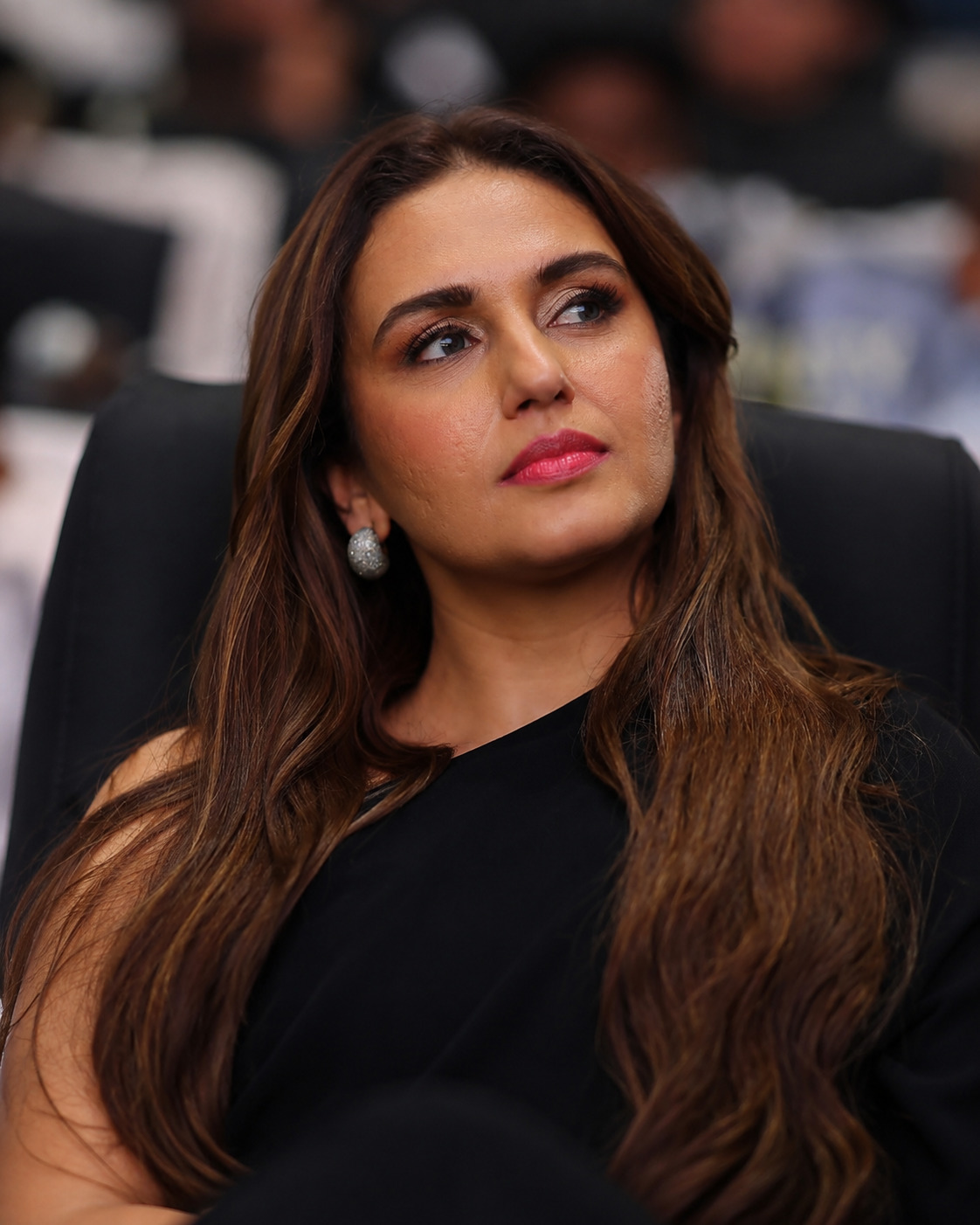
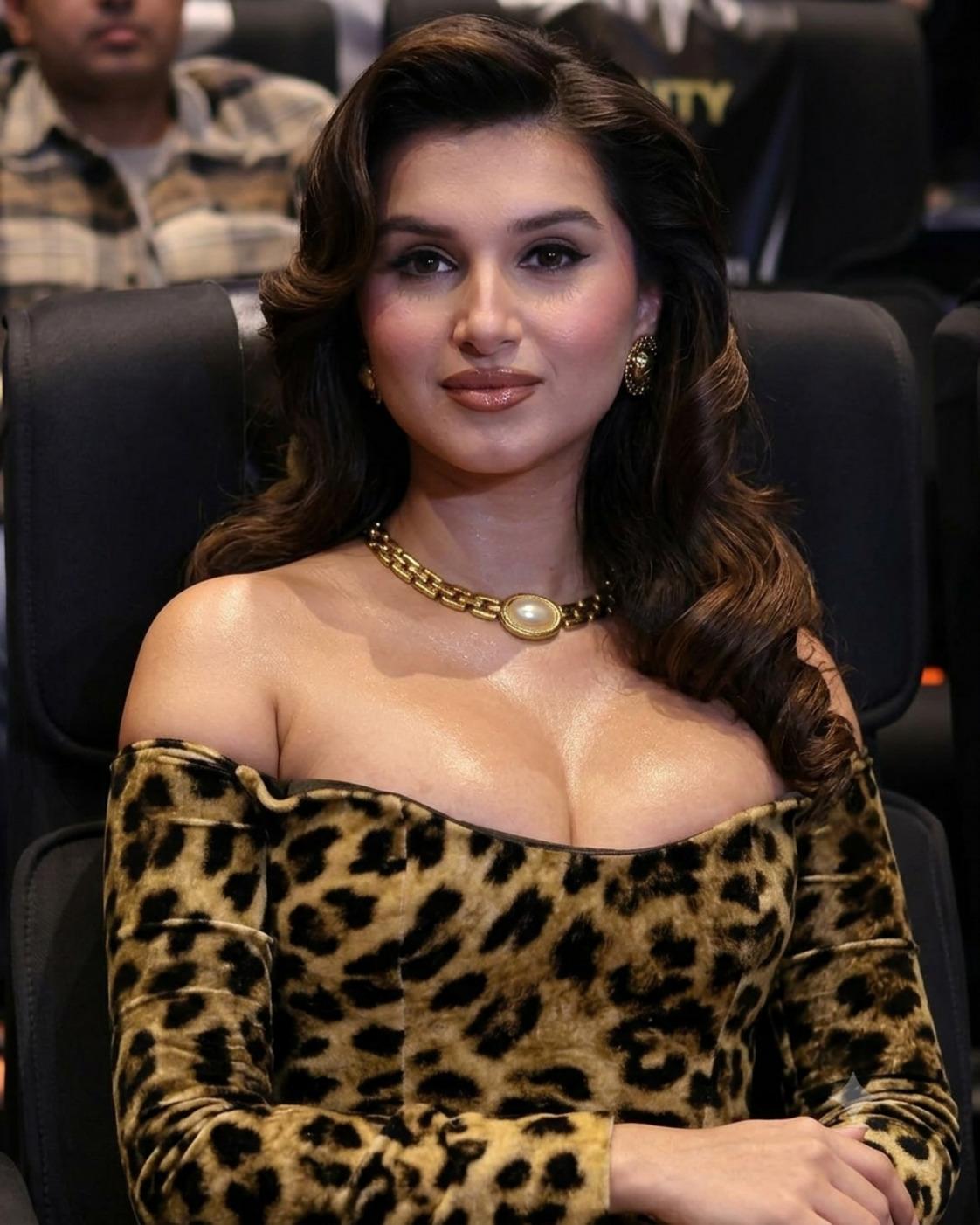
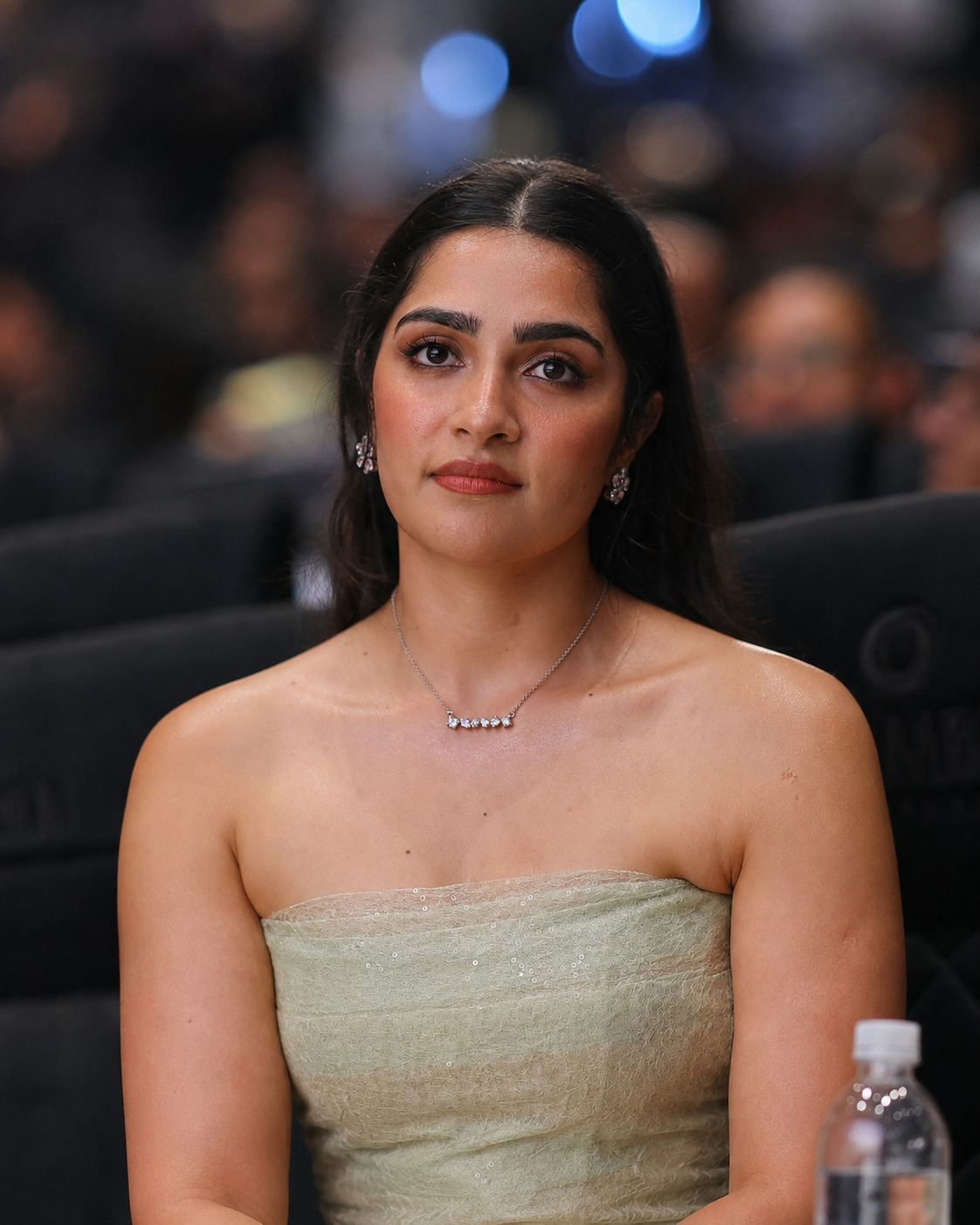
The film's primary cast — Yash, Kiara Advani, Nayanthara, Huma Qureshi, Tara Sutaria and Rukmini Vasanth

Yash plays the main lead. Kiara Advani joined the film in April 2024, as the female lead alongside Yash, thus also marking her Kannada debut. Huma Qureshi joined the cast in June 2024 for a key negative role. Tovino Thomas was rumoured to join the cast as the main antagonist in July 2024. However, later he clarified that he was not part of the film. In August 2024, Akshay Oberoi and Tara Sutaria joined the cast. In January 2025, Oberoi confirmed that Nayanthara joined the cast for a key role. Sudev Nair joined the cast in April 2025 while Rukmini Vasanth joined the cast in August 2025 following the completion of Kantara: Chapter 1. In February 2026, it was confirmed that Sanjeeda Sheikh would have a special appearance in the film.

Various foreign actors like Darrell D'Silva, Kyle Paul, and Beatriz Taufenbach featured in the film.

=== Filming ===
Principal photography commenced in August 2024 in Bengaluru along with the pooja ceremony. As part of the production process, the film utilised previsualisation to plan stunt sequences and ensure safety. A major portion of the shoot began in September 2024 at a large-scale 20-acre set near Bengaluru, recreating the period from the 1940s to the 1970s. The production involved an extensive team of over 1,000 crew members and 450 actors, including foreign extras. In October 2024, some sequences were filmed in the forest areas of Peenya in Bengaluru. Later, an FIR was filed against the producer for allegedly cutting trees in the forest area without permission. In November 2024, sequences featuring Advani were shot in Mumbai. A dance sequence featuring Yash and Advani was choreographed by Ganesh Acharya in January 2025 in Goa. In February 2025, Yash alongside Advani, Nayanthara, Qureshi and Sutaria shot several sequences in Bengaluru. In June 2025, the film's remaining shoot was shifted to Mumbai from Bengaluru so as to facilitate Advani's pregnancy. In September 2025, a massive 45 day shoot featuring many action sequences choreographed by J. J. Perry was completed in Mumbai. In October 2025, the final schedule was filmed in Bengaluru.

Additionally shooting also took place in Thoothukudi, where an action sequence was filmed, while a special song sequence was also shot in Jaipur.

== Music ==
The film's soundtrack album was composed by Vishal Mishra, Ravi Basrur, Tanishk Bagchi, Faheem Abdullah, and Arslan Nizami. Basrur also composed the background score of the film. Thus, it was Basrur's third collaboration with Yash after the KGF film franchise. The music rights were acquired by Zee Music Company.

The first single titled "Tabaahi" was released on 2 March 2026 in audio format. The full video of the song was released on 8 July 2026. The second single titled "Manamohaka" was released on 21 July 2026. The film's album was launched at a special event in Mumbai on 13 August 2026.

== Marketing ==
The film's announcement video alongside the title was revealed on 8 December 2023. A short glimpse titled "Birthday Peek" was released on 8 January 2025, coinciding with Yash's 39th birthday. The glimpse of Yash's character Raya was unveiled on 8 January 2026, coinciding with his 40th birthday. It generated instant global traction, amassing over 200 million views and 5.5 million likes within 24 hours across platforms. The official teaser was revealed on 20 February 2026. A promotional teaser titled "Ladies & Ladies" was released on 1 July 2026. The film's official trailer was revealed on 8 August 2026 at a special event in Bengaluru. The event was also attended by Shiva Rajkumar alongside the entire cast and crew. On 19 August 2026, the English version of the trailer was released. A pre-release event was held in Malla Reddy University in Hyderabad on 22 August. On 24 August 2026, a pre-release event took place in Nehru Stadium in Chennai. On 25 August 2026, another pre-release event was held at Forum Mall in Kochi.

== Release ==
=== Theatrical ===
Toxic was released worldwide on 26 August 2026, coinciding with Onam; in the standard, IMAX, Dolby Cinema, 4DX and EPIQ formats. Apart from the film's original Kannada and English languages, it was also released in the Hindi, Tamil, Telugu and Malayalam languages. The film's English version was released in India on 4 September 2026 with a shorter runtime of 176 minutes.

Originally, it was scheduled for release on 10 April 2025 but was eventually postponed due to delayed shooting and production issues. Then, it was announced for release on 19 March 2026; however, it was again postponed due to the ongoing crisis in Middle East Countries, as well as to avoid a clash with the Hindi film Dhurandhar: The Revenge. Later, it was announced for release on 4 June 2026, but was postponed again due to alignments for a better global distribution. The film was reportedly released in 12,000 screens worldwide.

=== Distribution ===
Sri Venkateswara Film Distributors acquired the distribution rights in Andhra Pradesh and Telangana for ₹120 crore (US$13 million). The distribution rights for North India and Nepal were acquired by AA Films. The overseas distribution rights for the Indian-language versions were acquired by Phars Film for ₹105 crore (US$11 million). Earlier, E4 Entertainment was announced as the distributor across Kerala, however they were later replaced by Panorama Studios. The distribution rights across Tamil Nadu were acquired by Think Studios, S Picture, Trident Arts and Five Star Senthil for ₹63 crore (US$6.7 million). In Karnataka, the film was self-distributed by KVN Productions and Monster Mind Creations themselves. Lionsgate distributed the English-language version worldwide, although release dates for the English-language version outside North America and India have not been announced yet.

=== Home media ===
Toxic will reportedly be available to stream on OTT platform ZEE5 from November 2026.

== Reception ==
=== Box office ===
Toxic: A Fairy Tale for Grown-Ups grossed ₹340 crores in 18 days. It grossed ₹337.80 crore (US$36 million) worldwide. It grossed ₹294.09 crore (US$31 million) in India and ₹43.71 crore (US$4.7 million) in the overseas market.

The film earned ₹239.30 crore (US$26 million) net in India, of which ₹130.29 crore (US$14 million) net was from Hindi version.

On its opening day, the film collected a total India net of ₹101.10 crore (US$11 million), including ₹50.31 crore (US$5.4 million)–₹55 crore (US$5.9 million) (Note: Bollywood Hungama reported ₹50.31 crore.; Box Office India reported ₹53.50 crore.; Cinema Express reported ₹55 crore.) from Hindi version with total India gross collections at ₹120.75 crore (US$13 million). Worldwide, it grossed ₹140.75 crore (US$15 million) on its opening day.

=== Critical response ===
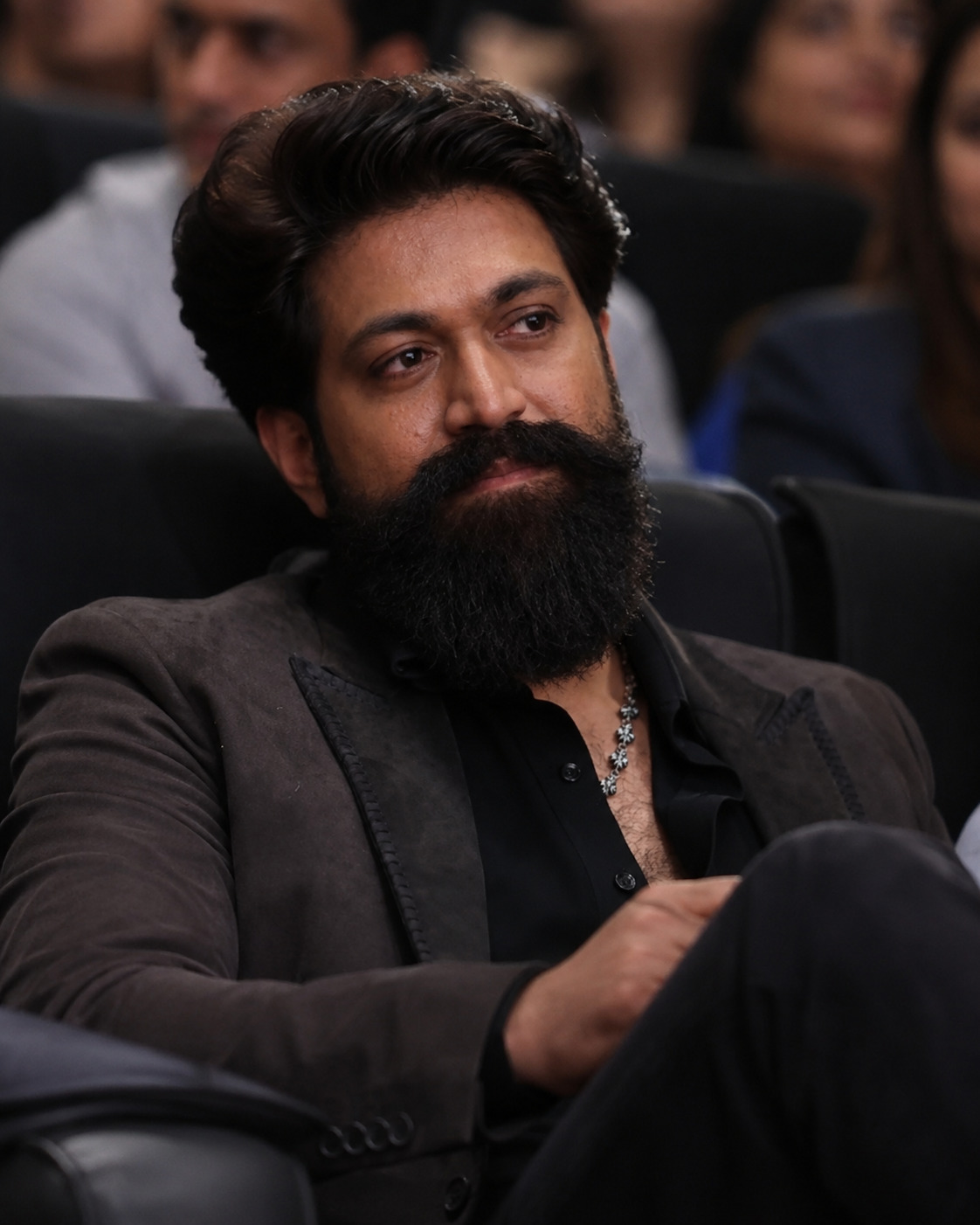
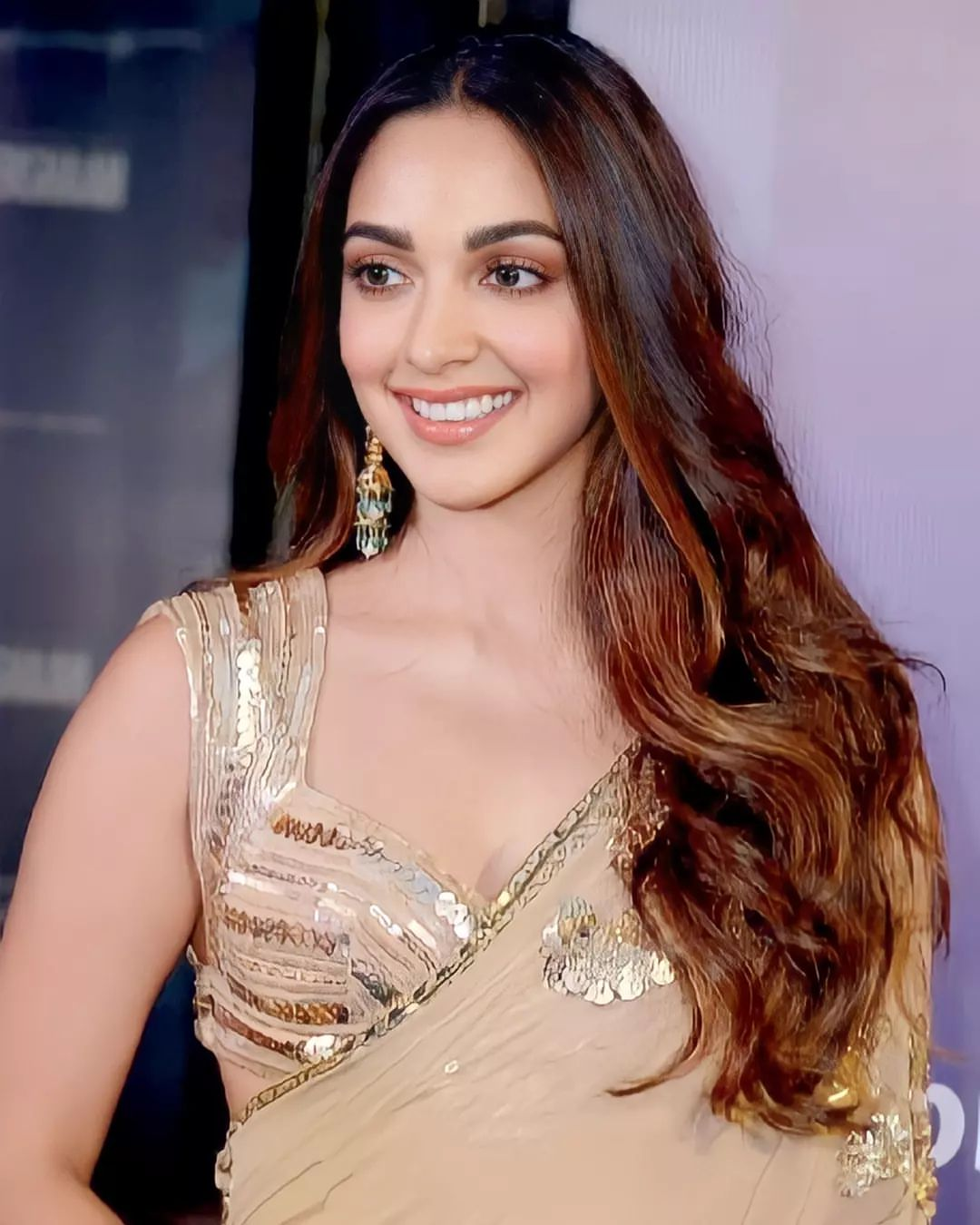
Yash and Kiara Advani received praise for their performances

On the review aggregator website Rotten Tomatoes, 21% of 28 critics' reviews are positive, with an average rating of 4.60/10.

Latha Srinivasan of NDTV gave the film 3 stars out of 5, concluding, "Toxic is not the gangster Hollywood-style epic one expected (it has some shades of KGF) but it's an ambitious effort undertaken by Yash and Geetu Mohandas to give the Indian audience a unique experiment and it delivers on that for the most part." Sridevi S. of The Times of India also gave the film 3 stars out of 5. She appreciated the visual presentation, cinematography, world-building, ambition behind the project, acting performances (especially that of Kiara Advani and Yash), screen presence of Yash, set design and action sequences. However, she criticised the screenplay, editing, music and pointed out the lack of cohesion in the plot and lack of depth in the characters. She critiqued, "Yet Toxic often mistakes visual grandeur for storytelling depth. The film soon begins to feel like a series of Instagram reels stitched together: each segment looks like something and feels like something, but ultimately adds up to very little. Beneath the violence, sex, swagger and scale, the screenplay needed considerably more substance." A critic at Zoom TV gave the film 3 stars out of 5 as well and observed, "Despite its ambitious scope and a high-profile ensemble cast, the film presents a mixed experience that balances visual spectacle with narrative inconsistencies."

Zinia Bandyopadhyay of Firstpost gave the film 2.5 stars out of 5, praising the acting performances of Yash and the ensemble cast despite the 'limited screen time' of latter but criticising the 'sluggish pacing.' She wrote, "My biggest complaint, however, remains the editing. Everything seems to run in slow motion. Dialogues are slowed down to give them weight, scenes are stretched for impact and the pace before the interval feels deliberately held back. At times, it feels as though you are watching the movie in 0.75x speed. At 3 hours and 15 minutes, Toxic could have benefited from some serious trimming." Siddhant Adlakha of IGN gave the film a 5 out of 10 review score, concluding, "Led by megastar Yash in a dual role, the decades-spanning gangster saga Toxic: A Fairy Tale for Grown-Ups is oppressively overbearing and cut within an inch of its life in the vein of a modern movie trailer. While it eventually coheres in its final minutes with a reveal that — although over-explained — brings the themes to a grand crescendo, it's hard to say the 3-hour buildup is worth the wait."

Kaveree Bamzai of Open Magazine gave the film 2 stars out of 5 and concluded in her review, "So many women, so little time. What you get is beautiful gowns for gorgeous women, some ghosts from the past plaguing Raya, and set pieces costing the GDP of a minor state, and then, like a circus trick, poof, it's all gone. But not before an interminable running time tests one's patience." Sukanya Verma of Rediff also gave the film 2 stars out of 5, noting "Purely relying on Yash's aura to the point of draining him dry, Toxic doesn't have an smidgen of storytelling in its body rolling in sex, shock and sounds of bullets fired at anyone and everyone." A critic at Bollywood Hungama gave the film 2 stars out of 5 as well, concluding, "On the whole, TOXIC relies far too heavily on style, swagger and the familiar KGF-esque aura of Yash, while falling short on a compelling story and emotional connect. The performances, scale, action and technical finesse provide occasional highs, but the uneven screenplay, sluggish portions and a climax twist that is unlikely to resonate with the mass audience prove to be major deterrents." Arfa Javaid of ABP Live, too, gave the film 2 stars out of 5, noting "Toxic is an over-the-top action spectacle rescued by Yash, but weighed down by a screenplay that struggles to give all that violence, sex and visual excess a compelling purpose." Likewise, Sanjay Ponnappa of India Today gave the film 2 stars out of 5, remarking, "The biggest problem is the film's lack of clarity about what it wants to be. Is it a gangster drama? An emotional drama? A psychological thriller? It tries to dabble in all of these, but never quite commits to any one of them. Being a jack of all trades and master of none can still work if the film manages to keep you invested. But what happens when the card you're dealt is a dud? That is, unfortunately, what Toxic feels like."

Shubhra Gupta of The Indian Express gave the film 1.5 stars out of 5, writing "It may be Geetu Mohandas at the helm, but it is finally, and irrevocably, a Rocking Star Yash film, with eye-glazing, endless litany of violence." Pranati A. S. of Deccan Herald also gave the film 1.5 stars out of 5, summing up in her review, "Perhaps it is time to say this again: Godard's famous line, "All you need to make a movie is a girl and a gun", was never meant to be taken this literally."

Debanjan Dhar of Outlook gave the film 1 star out of 5, noting "Director Geetu Mohandas probes how far men with vain, violently maniacal impulses can go, but her design is almost cartoonish and her voice is dulled by studio artillery, despite DP Rajeev Ravi's extravagant mounting." Neeshita Nyayapati of Hindustan Times also gave the film 1 star out of 5, summing up in her review, "Toxic tries to be the antithesis of glorifying problematic characters but ends up pandering to them." Mayank Shekhar of Mid-Day gave the film 1 star out of 5 as well and was critical towards the storytelling and unclear character motivations.

Sruthi Ganapathy Raman of The Hollywood Reporter India wrote in her review, "The star's charisma gets him and his character out of a lot of sticky situations in Geetu Mohandas's 'Toxic,' but is still not enough to save the film's inconsistent and lavishly hollow drama." Nandini Ramnath of Scroll.in juxtaposed, "Despite the opportunity to populate an overtly male genre with female characters, Toxic peddles tiresome stereotypes about damaging mothers and damaged single mothers. There are sharper insights into toxic masculinity from Sandeep Reddy Vanga's Animal, which, while valourising its hero, also provides a glimpse into the roots of his derangement."

Vivek M.V. of The Hindu highlighted the blurred lines of distinction between Toxic and KGF writing, "With Toxic, Yash makes it clear that he is, above all, an image-conscious star. The dialogues of his character, which he is now understood to have written, feel like they belong to the KGF universe. Even his dialogue delivery seems like an extension of his performance in KGF. None of it fits the world of Toxic." Sowmya Rajendran of The News Minute appreciated Kiara Advani particularly, writing, "The real show-stopper, however, is Kiara Advani as Nadia. Her luminescent beauty lends a fairytale quality to the scenes, mingling the princess archetype of innocence and purity with a luscious sensuality that makes her 'Other Woman' role irresistible." She also had praise for Yash's portrayal as Ticket and wrote, "Yash also plays Ticket, Raya's son, who appears to be part Animal, part Joker. Here, too, there is manic energy and deadpan comedy, but the actor also brings a certain shattered vulnerability to the role. This is crucial because beneath all the glitz and glamour, Toxic aspires to be a character study." However, she criticised the lack of subversion in the film, as a counterweight against toxicity, writing, "When the toxicity offers so many concrete pay-offs, the subversion also has to do that to dilute its impact. Instead, the unravelling, set in a snowy fairyland with a montage of abstract visuals, does not have the same power over the audience."

BVS Prakash of Deccan Chronicle critiqued, "The problem is that the fictional world created by director Geetu Mohandas never manages to draw the audience in. Instead of building a compelling narrative around its period setting and gangster backdrop, the film relies heavily on violence, gore, intimacy and glamour. The result is an over-the-top action adventure with very little substance." He juxtaposed, "Unlike KGF, where the core story had a strong emotional and relatable foundation that made Yash's larger-than-life heroics work, Toxic feels contrived from the outset. The film's premise of a power struggle surrounding Portugal-ruled Goa, opium and casinos is difficult to buy, and the narrative repeatedly sacrifices logic for style."

=== Thematic analysis ===
Sreeju Sudhakaran of Rediff.com pointed out, "It is deeply ironic that a film helmed by a female director, featuring five major actresses, utterly fails the Bechdel Test."

Before the film's release, director Geetu Mohandas described it as a gangster film with a "female gaze". Yash also said that Mohandas brought a different perspective to the depiction of desire, romance and sensuality in the film. After its release, however, some critics argued that the female characters remained largely defined by their relationships with the male protagonist, raising questions about how fully the film realised its stated perspective.

== Controversies ==
Following the release of the glimpse video for one of Yash's characters in the film, the Women's wing of Aam Aadmi Party submitted a complaint to the Karnataka State Commission for Women as they had objections with the obscene visuals featured in the teaser. In February 2026, another formal complaint was lodged to the CBFC by the National Christian Federation where they alleged that the film's teaser depicts obscene scenes and also hurts religious sentiments by including a statue of Archangel Michael in the fight sequence inside the cemetery.

Following the film's Hyderabad pre-release event in Malla Reddy University that was held on 22 August, a case was registered against the event organisers and management after a scaffolding-mounted soundbox collapsed, which injured five people.
