= Haryana State Commission for Women =

Statutory body for women's rights, India

Commission overview
- Formed: 1993
- Jurisdiction: Government of Haryana
- Headquarters: Haryana State Commission For Women, Bays No. 39-40, CADA Bhawan, Sector-4, Panchkula, Haryana.
- Commission executive: Smt. Renu Bhatiya, Chairperson
- Website: Official websiteOfficial website

Haryana State Commission for Women is a statutory body constituted in the year 1993 to deal with the issues relating to crime against women in the state of Haryana. The commission for welfare of women in the state was set up by Haryana Government as a quasi-judicial body.

== History and objectives ==
Haryana State Commission for Women was formed to investigate specific problems relating to women and apart from studying women related issues from the state. The commission is equipped with powers to safeguard rights of women and ensure their protection and equality against any form of harassment and issues faced in the family and community.

The commission was created with the following objectives:

- Ensuring protection and welfare of women.
- Handle gender-based issues through timely intervention in case of any violation of relevant laws or opportunity denial or depriving the women of any rights.
- Recommending to state government on women-based issues.
- The commission occasionally takes steps to create awareness in public regarding the women-based legislation in the state.

== Composition ==
Haryana State Commission for Women was formed with a chairperson and maximum 5 members. The social welfare department of the state makes modalities for appointing the Chairman of the State Commission for Women.

Smt. Preeti Bhardwaj Dalal is the Chairperson of the Haryana State Commission for Women. She along with other members will hold office for a period of 3 years.

== Activities ==
Haryana State Commission for Women was formed to perform below activities:

- Commission should ensure that it adheres to the provision and protection guaranteed for women under Constitution of India and women related legislations.
- In case any agency in the state fails to implement protective measures against women, getting the same to the notice of Government.
- Making recommendations for the amendments in any law if it fails on provision of justice to the women of the state.
- Taking up with concerned authorities any issue of violation of women's rights and recommending follow-up action to them.
- Women who have complaints of violation of their rights and non-implementation of their protective measures guaranteed under the Constitution of India can directly approach Women Commission for redressal.
- Counselling and assisting women who are victims of atrocities and discrimination in the state.
- Financing litigation expenses for any issues involving mass group of women and occasionally make reports to the state government relating to them.
- Inspecting any premises, jail or other remand home where women prisoners are lodged or any other case and bringing them to the notice of respective authorities, in case of need.
- Enquire, study and investigate any specific women-based issues.
- Initiate educational research or undertaking any promotional method and recommend ways for ensuring women representation in all areas and identifying reasons depriving them of their rights.
- To enquire suo-moto or any complaints of any issue which deprives women of their rights or women protection laws not being implemented or noncompliance of any policies relating to them or failure of following instructions relating to women welfare and relief associated with them.

== Controversies ==
The Haryana State Commission for Women has faced significant controversies that have raised questions about its operational integrity, impartiality, and effectiveness.

=== Inaction in Sexual Assault Case Involving Minor Girls ===
In 2023, the HSCW came under intense criticism for its delayed and inadequate response to a mass sexual assault case involving 142 minor girls in Jind district. Civil society groups and child rights activists accused the commission of failing to meet victims or their families and of handling the case through bureaucratic correspondence from its Panchkula headquarters rather than conducting field investigations. The perceived apathy contributed to a lack of trust among the victims and their families and drew broader criticism regarding the commission’s efficacy in addressing gender-based violence.

=== Handling of Political and High-Profile Cases ===
In 2024, the HSCW issued a suo motu notice to Congress leader Randeep Singh Surjewala over comments allegedly made against BJP MP Hema Malini, deeming them offensive to women’s dignity. Surjewala claimed the remarks were distorted and politically weaponized, leading to allegations that the commission was selectively targeting opposition leaders to serve partisan interests.

=== Alleged Extortion and Misuse of Authority ===
Critics accused the commission of functioning as an "extortion racket" in marital disputes. The controversy deepened in 2025 when Vice-Chairperson Sonia Aggarwal was arrested along with her driver for allegedly accepting a INR 1 lakh bribe to settle a complaint. These incidents reinforced public perceptions of corruption and misuse of institutional power within the commission.

=== Misuse of Jurisdiction in Ali Khan Mahmudabad Case ===
In 2025, the HSCW summoned political scientist Ali Khan Mahmudabad, alleging that his social media posts were derogatory toward women in the armed forces and incited communal unrest. Legal experts and academics criticized the move as a jurisdictional overreach and an infringement on academic freedom and freedom of speech. An open letter signed by over 1,600 individuals accused the commission of slandering Mahmudabad and acting outside its legal authority.

== See also ==
National Commission for Women
