= Andhra Pradesh Women Commission =

Statutory body for women's rights, India

Andhra Pradesh State Commission for Women
Commission overview
- Formed: February 2016 in residuary Andhra Pradesh
- Jurisdiction: Government of Andhra Pradesh
- Headquarters: 4th Floor, MGM Capital, Chinakakani, NH, Mangalagiri, Guntur District. Pin : 522503.
- Commission executive: Vacant
- Website: Official website

Andhra Pradesh State Commission for Women is a statutory body constituted as per the A.P. Women's Commission Act-1998 as amended by Act No.9 of 2023 to deal with the issues relating to crime against women in the state of Andhra Pradesh. The commission for welfare of women in the state was set up by Andhra Pradesh Government as a quasi-judicial body.

== History and objectives ==
Andhra Pradesh State Commission for Women was formed to investigate specific problems relating to women and apart from studying women related issues from the state. The Commission is equipped with powers to safeguard rights of women and ensure their protection and equality against any form of harassment and issues faced in the family and community.

The commission was created with the following objectives:

- Ensuring protection and welfare of women.
- Handle gender-based issues through timely intervention in case of any violation of relevant laws or opportunity denial or depriving the women of any rights.
- Recommending to state government on women-based issues.
- The commission occasionally takes steps to create awareness in public regarding the women-based legislation in the state.

== Composition ==
The Women Commission shall consist of the chairperson and not more than 6 members residing in the state. The statute lays down qualifications for the appointment of the Chairperson and Members of the Commission.

- A Chairperson, shall be eminent women committed to cause of welfare of women
- Six Members to be nominated by the State, provided that at least one Member each shall be from amongst persons belonging to the Scheduled Castes, Scheduled Tribes, Backward classes and Minorities Communities respectively
- To enquire suo-moto or any complaints of any issue which deprives women of their rights or women protection laws not being implemented or noncompliance of any policies relating to them or failure of following instructions relating to women welfare and relief associated with them.

== Public response ==
In February 2018, women’s organisations in Visakhapatnam staged protests seeking action against Ram Gopal Varma over alleged derogatory remarks, with media reports noting that protesters expressed dissatisfaction with delays by local police and criticised the response of the Andhra Pradesh State Commission for Women, after which a case was registered and an investigation initiated.

== Activities ==
Andhra Pradesh State Commission for Women was formed to perform below activities:

- Commission should ensure that it adheres to the provision and protection guaranteed for women under Constitution of India and women related legislations.
- In case any agency in the state fails to implement protective measures against women, getting the same to the notice of Government.
- Making recommendations for the amendments in any law if it fails on provision of justice to the women of the state.
- Taking up with concerned authorities any issue of violation of women's rights and recommending follow-up action to them.
- Women who have complaints of violation of their rights and non-implementation of their protective measures guaranteed under the Constitution of India can directly approach Women Commission for redressal.
- Counselling and assisting women who are victims of atrocities and discrimination in the state.
- Financing litigation expenses for any issues involving mass group of women and occasionally make reports to the state government relating to them.
- Inspecting any premises, jail or other remand home where women prisoners are lodged or any other case and bringing them to the notice of respective authorities, in case of need.
- Enquire, study and investigate any specific women-based issues.
- Initiate educational research or undertaking any promotional method and recommend ways for ensuring women representation in all areas and identifying reasons depriving them of their rights.

== List of Chairpersons ==
No.	Name	Term of office		
	Tripurana Venkataratnam	5 June 2013	1 June 2014	361 days
	Nannapaneni Rajakumari	10 February 2016	7 August 2019	3 years, 178 days
	Vasireddy Padma	26 August 2019	4 March 2024	4 years, 191 days
	Gajjala Venkata Lakshmi	16 March 2024	25 August 2024	162 days
	Dr. Rayapati Sailaja	19 May 2025		1 year, 81 days

== Related Articles ==
National Commission for Women
