= National Commission for Women =

Statutory body of the Government of India

National Women Commission of India
- राष्ट्रीय महिला आयोग

Statutory Body/Commission overview
- Formed: 31 January 1992 (34 years ago)
- Jurisdiction: India
- Headquarters: New Delhi, India
- Statutory Body/Commission executive: Vijaya Kishore Rahatkar, Chairperson
- Website: www.ncw.gov.in

The National Commission for Women (NCW) is a statutory body of the Government of India, generally concerned with advising the government on all policy matters affecting women. It was established on 31 January 1992 under the provisions of National Commission for Women Act, 1990. The first head of the commission was Jayanti Patnaik. As of 19 October 2024, Vijaya Kishore Rahatkar is the chairperson.

== Activities ==
The objective of the NCW is to represent the rights of women in India and to provide a voice for their issues and concerns. The subjects of the commission's campaigns have included dowry, politics, religion, equal representation for women in jobs, and the exploitation of women for labour. The NCW has also discussed police abuses against women.

The commission publishes a monthly newsletter, Rashtra Mahila ("Nation's Women"), in both Hindi and English.

== Controversies ==
=== Section 497 of the Indian Penal Code ===
In December 2006 and January 2007, the NCW found itself at the center of a minor controversy over its insistence that Section 497 of the Indian Penal Code not be changed to make adulterous wives equally prosecutable by their husbands.

But the grounds on which [then NCW chairperson] Ms. Vyas resists the logic of making this a criminal offence — particularly for women, as often recommended — are not as encouraging. She is averse to holding the adulterous woman equally culpable as the adulterous man because women, she believes, are never offenders. They are always the victims.

The NCW has demanded that women should not be punished for adultery, as a woman is "the victim and not an offender" in such cases. They have also advocated the amendment of Section 198 of the CrPC to allow women to file complaints against unfaithful husbands and prosecute them for their promiscuous behaviour. This was in response to "loopholes" in the Indian Penal Code that allowed men to file adultery charges against other men who have engaged in illicit relations but did not allow women to file charges against their husbands.

The Commission has also worked to guarantee women security in unconventional relationships.

=== Mangalore pub attack controversy ===
The NCW came under sharp criticism for their response to the attack by forty male members of the Hindu right-wing Sri Ram Sena on eight women in a bar in Mangalore in late January 2009. Video from the attack shows the women were punched, pulled by their hair, and thrown out of the pub.

NCW member Nirmala Venkatesh was sent to assess the situation, and said in an interview that the pub did not have adequate security and that the women should have protected themselves. Venkatesh said, "If the girls feel they were not doing anything wrong why are they afraid to come forward and give a statement?" On 6 February, the NCW said they decided not to accept Venkatesh's report but would not be sending a new team to Mangalore. On 27 February, the Prime Minister's Office approved the removal of Nirmala Venkatesh on disciplinary grounds.

=== Guwahati molestation controversy ===
The NCW came under fire again after the molestation of a 17-year-old girl by a gang of men outside a pub in Guwahati on 9 July 2012. NCW member Alka Lamba was accused of leaking the name of the minor victim to the media, and was subsequently removed from the fact-finding committee, though she remains a member of the commission. The following week, NCW chairperson Mamta Sharma made comments suggesting that women "be careful how you dress", which invited criticism that she was guilty of victim blaming. The controversy led activists to call for a restructuring of the commission.

=== Badaun rape and murder controversy ===
In 2021, the NCW was once again criticized for engaging in victim blaming following the gang rape and murder of a woman in Badaun, Uttar Pradesh. A two-member delegation from the NCW was sent to the site of the incident to meet with the victim's family and prepare a fact-finding report. NCW member Chandramukhi Devi, who was part of the delegation, stated to the press that part of the blame for the incident lay with the victim, as she had chosen to visit the temple late in the evening. Devi stated, "A woman should not go out at odd hours under the influence of somebody. I think if she had not gone out in the evening, or had some child along with her, this could have been prevented." The comments attracted wide criticism on social media, as well as from celebrities. Following public criticism, Devi withdrew her remarks.

=== LGBTQ members ===
The NCW has been criticized for limited action in matters involving LGBTQ individuals, particularly lesbian and queer women. Despite the decriminalization of homosexuality and the striking down of Section 377, LGBTQ members, mostly lesbians, have faced threats to life, social ostracism, and in some cases, forced marriages. While legal protections exist for transgender women, similar protections have not consistently been extended to lesbian and queer adult women. As a result, some lesbian couples have sought protection from the judiciary due to threats from family members, and in some cases, have been subjected to conversion therapy, as law enforcement authorities and NCW members have reportedly been slow to act on complaints filed by queer couples.

=== Inaction against Political leaders ===
The NCW has faced criticism for inaction against political leaders for comments against women, particularly on serious matters like rape. Despite complaints, no formal action is taken, especially during election periods. In March 2010, Samajwadi Party leader Mulayam Singh Yadav reportedly made several controversial comments regarding the Women's Reservation Bill.

At an election rally during the 2014 elections, Yadav stated that "Boys are boys, they make mistakes, why hand them for rape." On 19 August 2015, Yadav remarked that gang-rapes are impractical and that victims in such cases tend to lie, for which he was summoned by the Judicial Magistrate of Mahoba district court in Uttar Pradesh. His remarks were widely criticized, and despite complaints to the Election Commission and the NCW, no formal action was taken; he was subsequently elected from the constituency of Mainpuri in the 2014 elections. As a result of these statements, some media outlets described Yadav and the Samajwadi Party as "Supporters and Defenders of Rape and Rapists."

== Chairpersons ==
No.	Name	Portrait	From	To
1	Jayanti Patnaik		3 February 1992	30 January 1995
2	V. Mohini Giri		21 July 1995	20 July 1998
3	Vibha Parthasarathy		18 January 1999	17 January 2002
4	Poornima Advani		25 January 2002	24 January 2005
5	Girija Vyas		16 February 2005	15 February 2008
(5)	Girija Vyas		9 April 2008	8 April 2011
6	Mamta Sharma		2 August 2011	1 August 2014
7	Lalitha Kumaramangalam		29 September 2014	28 September 2017
8	Rekha Sharma		7 August 2018	7 August 2024
9	Vijaya Kishore Rahatkar		19 October 2024	Incumbent

== State Level Women Commission ==
Following is the list of state level women commissions

Rank	State	States Women commission
1	Andhra Pradesh	Andhra Pradesh Women Commission
2	Arunachal Pradesh	Arunachal Pradesh State Commission for Women
3	Assam	Assam State Commission for Women
4	Bihar	Bihar State Women Commission
5	Chhattisgarh	Chhattisgarh State Women Commission
6	Goa	Goa State Commission For Women
7	Gujarat	Gujarat State Commission For Women
8	Haryana	Haryana State Commission for Women
9	Himachal Pradesh	Himachal Pradesh State Commission for Women
10	Jammu and Kashmir	Jammu and Kashmir State Commission for Women
11	Jharkhand	Jharkhand State Commission for Women
12	Karnataka	Karnataka State Commission for Women
13	Kerala	Kerala Women's Commission
14	Madhya Pradesh	Madhya Pradesh State Commission For Women
15	Maharashtra	Maharashtra State Commission for Woman
16	Manipur	Manipur State Commission for Women
17	Meghalaya	Meghalaya State Commission for Women
18	Mizoram	Mizoram State Commission for Women
19	Nagaland	Nagaland State Commission for Women
20	Odisha	Odisha State Commission For Women
21	Punjab	Punjab State Commission For Women
22	Rajasthan	Rajasthan State Commission For Women
22	Sikkim	Sikkim State Commission For Women
23	Tamil Nadu	Tamil Nadu State Commission For Women
24	Telangana	Telangana State Women Commission
25	Tripura	Tripura State Commission For Women
26	Uttar Pradesh	Uttar Pradesh State Women Commission
27	Uttarakhand	Uttarakhand State Commission For Women
28	West Bengal	West Bengal Commission for Women
29	Delhi	Delhi Commission for Women
30	Pondicherry	Puducherry Women Commission

== See also ==
- Domestic violence in India
- Dowry system in India
- Female foeticide in India
- Feminism in India
- Gender inequality in India
- Gender pay gap in India
- Men's rights movement in India
- Rape in India
- Welfare schemes for women in India
- Women in India
- Women in Indian Armed Forces
- Women's Reservation Bill
- Women's suffrage in India
