= Girija Vyas =

Indian politician (1946–2025)

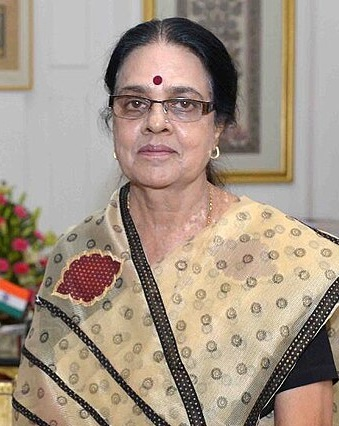
- Vyas in 2017

Union Minister of Housing and Urban Poverty Alleviation
- In office 17 June 2013 – 26 May 2014
- Prime Minister: Manmohan Singh
- Preceded by: Ajay Maken
- Succeeded by: Venkaiah Naidu

Union Deputy Minister of Information and Broadcasting
- In office 21 June 1991 – 17 March 1993
- Prime Minister: P. V. Narasimha Rao
- Minister: Ajit Kumar Panja
- Preceded by: S. Krishna Kumar

Chairperson of the National Commission for Women
- In office 16 February 2005 – 8 April 2011
- Preceded by: Poornima Advani
- Succeeded by: Mamta Sharma

Member of Parliament, Lok Sabha
- In office 16 May 2009 – 16 May 2014
- Preceded by: Shrichand Kriplani
- Succeeded by: Chandra Prakash Joshi
- Constituency: Chittorgarh
- In office 6 October 1999 – 13 May 2004
- Preceded by: Shanti Lal Chaplot
- Succeeded by: Kiran Maheshwari
- Constituency: Udaipur
- In office 19 June 1991 – 3 March 1998
- Preceded by: Gulab Chand Kataria
- Succeeded by: Shanti Lal Chaplot
- Constituency: Udaipur

Personal details
- Born: 8 July 1946 Nathdwara, Rajputana Agency, British India
- Died: 1 May 2025 (aged 78) Ahmedabad, Gujarat, India
- Party: Indian National Congress

Girija Vyas (8 July 1946 – 1 May 2025) was an Indian politician, poet, and author. She was a member of the 15th Lok Sabha, from the Chittorgarh constituency and previously served four terms as Udaipur's Lok Sabha representative. She was president of the fifth National Commission for Women of India and had published 8 books.

== Early life and education ==
Girija Vyas was born on July 8, 1946, in Udaipur, Rajasthan, to Krishna Sharma and Jamuna Devi Vyas. Raised in Nathdwara, she was influenced by her father, a freedom fighter, and her mother, a teacher and women's empowerment advocate. Vyas completed her graduation and MA-Philosophy at the University of Udaipur (now Mohanlal Sukhadia University) and earned a Doctorate in Philosophy from Delhi University for her thesis: Dissertation on a Comparative Study of Ethical Teachings in Gita and Bible (1973). She had taught at Mohanlal Sukhadia University and later at University of Delaware under a postdoctoral fellowship at the university during 1979–80.

Vyas published eight books, three of which were poetry collections in Urdu, Hindi, and English. Her notable works include Ehsaas Ke Par (Urdu poems), Seep, Samundar Aur Moti (Hindi and Urdu poems), and Nostalgia (English verses).

== Political career ==
In 1985, Vyas was elected to the Rajasthan Legislative Assembly from Udaipur. She managed diverse portfolios in the Hari Dev Joshi government. She was also a member of the Estimates Committee during this period. Vyas returned to the Rajasthan Assembly in 2008 to resign after a year.

in 1991, Vyas won the Udaipur Lok Sabha seat in the 10th Lok Sabha. She served as Union Deputy Minister for Information and Broadcasting under Prime Minister P.V. Narasimha Rao until 1993. She was re-elected from Udaipur in 1996, 1998, and 1999, securing four terms from the constituency. In 2009, she won from Chittorgarh in the 15th Lok Sabha, serving as chief whip of the Congress party.

In 2013, she was appointed Minister of Housing and Urban Poverty Alleviation in the Manmohan Singh government. From 2005 to 2011, she chaired the fifth National Commission for Women (NCW), focusing on women's rights and empowerment. She contested the 2014 Lok Sabha election from Chittorgarh but lost to the BJP's Chandra Prakash Joshi.

In 1993, she became president of the All India Mahila Congress, advocating for women's political participation. She served as president of the Rajasthan Pradesh Congress Committee. Between 1990 and her death, she was a member of the All-India Congress Committee, later serving as the chair of its Media Department. She was also a member of Indo-EU Civil Society.

== Controversy ==
In the early 2000s, Vyas was implicated in a petrol pump allotment scam, where allotments were allegedly made to prominent politicians or their relatives. In 2004, a two-judge panel recommended to the Supreme Court that her petrol pump allotment be canceled.

== Death ==
On 31 March 2025, Vyas sustained burn injuries while performing an arti in her Udaipur home when her dupatta caught fire. She received treatment at an Ahmedabad hospital but died on 1 May, at the age of 78. Her funeral was held in Udaipur on 2 May.
