= Goldsikka ATM =

Indian gold-dispensing ATM

Goldsikka ATM is an Indian automated teller machine (ATM) in Hyderabad that dispenses Gold coins. It was designed to dispense items made of pure gold from automated banking vending machines. It was India's first gold ATM. It was also the world's first to provide real time gold pricing for the ATM.

== History ==
It was launched by Goldsikka Pvt. Ltd. with the collaboration of OpenCube Technologies Pvt. Ltd. in 3 December 2022 at Ashoka Raghupathi Chambers, Begumpet. It was inaugurated by Vakiti Sunitha Laxma Reddy, Chairperson of Telangana Women's Commission. In December 2023, Goldsikka ATM was launched at Ameerpet metro station, that dispenses Gold and silver coins.

== Functions ==
It can dispense gold coins ranging from 0.5 grams to 100 grams. In the machine, people can use credit or debit card. It gives 24/7 service to their customers and also gives the live price of gold. The gold will be of 24 carat and can store 5 kg gold. It gives pure and hallmarked gold coins. Its price is updated from the London bullion market. Its coins are dispersed in packs which are tamper proof and certified with 999 purity.

== See also ==
- Gold to Go
- Gold as an investment
