= Poornima Advani =

Indian lawyer, author and social worker

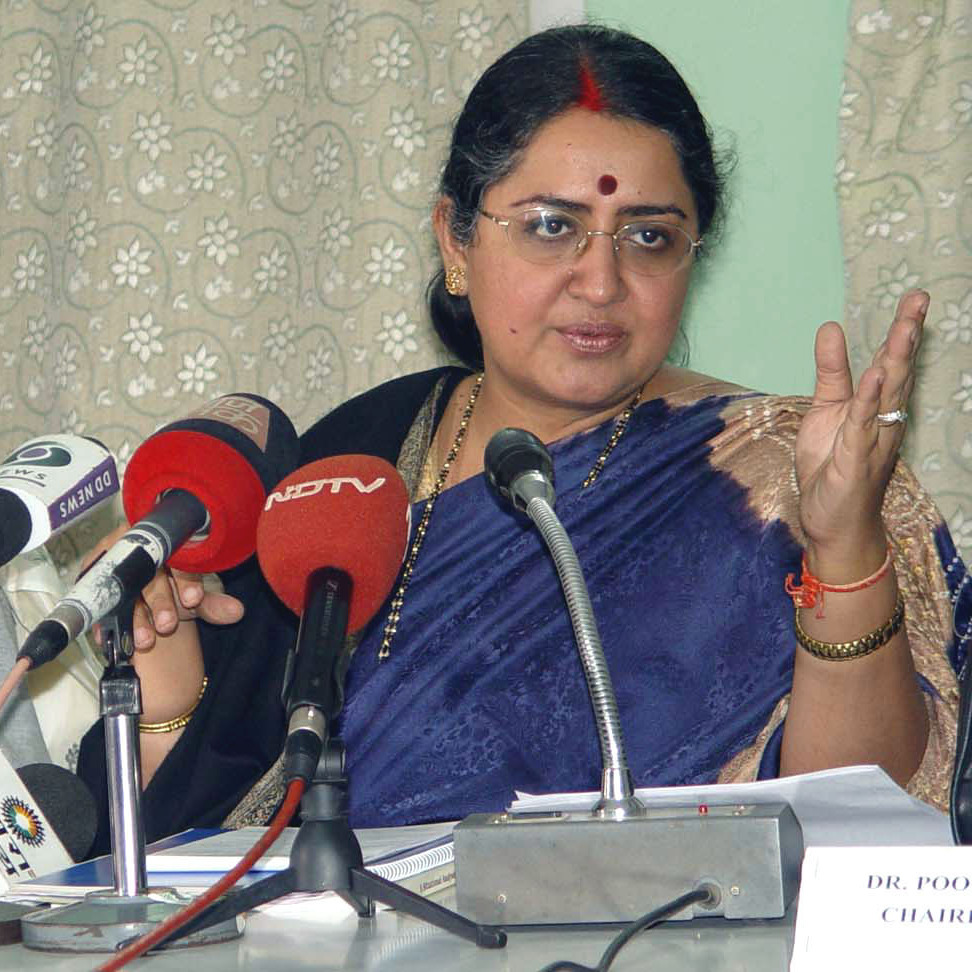
- Advani addressing the media in 2005.

Chairperson of National Commission for Women
- In office 25 January 2002 – 24 January 2005
- Succeeded by: Girija Vyas

Personal details
- Profession: Lawyer, Author, Professor, Social worker

Poornima Advani was an Indian lawyer, author and social worker. She has served as the chairperson of National Commission for Women (NCW), from January 2002 to January 2005.

== Biography ==
Her mother, Meera Govind Advani is an author.

Advani holds a doctorate in law from the University of Bombay and a post-graduate diploma in physiotherapy.

She was a member of the NCW and has written legal and medical publications. She was also a lecturer in the department of law, University of Bombay and also in many global universities, including University of Queensland (Australia), School of Oriental and South African Studies, London; University of East London; and London School of Economics. She is currently a Partner at The Law Point, a national law firm, which she co-founded in the year 2005, along with Mr. B.N. Makhija, Former Principal Advisor, Planning Commission of India.

== Publications ==
She has authored a book titled Indian Judiciary: A Tribute (1997).

== Awards ==
Advani was honoured with the Acharya Tulsi Kartitva Puraskar in 2003.
