= Canadian International Trade Tribunal =

The Canadian International Trade Tribunal (CITT) is an independent quasi-judicial body operating in Canada's trade system. The administrative tribunal reports to Parliament through the Minister of Finance. The Tribunal was established on December 31, 1988, and is based in Ottawa, Ontario. The Tribunal is composed of a chairperson and up to six permanent members appointed by the Governor-in-council. Temporary members may also be appointed. It replaced the Canadian Import Tribunal.

The Tribunal is mandated to act within five key areas:

- Anti-dumping injury inquiries: To inquire into and decide whether dumped and/or subsidized imports have caused, or are threatening to cause, injury to a domestic industry
- Procurement inquiries: To inquire into complaints by potential suppliers concerning procurement by the federal government and decide whether the federal government breached its obligations under certain trade agreements to which Canada is party
- Customs and excise appeals: To hear and decide appeals of decisions of the Canada Border Services Agency made under the Customs Act and the Special Import Measures Act (SIMA) and of the Minister of National Revenue made under the Excise Tax Act
- Economic and tariff inquiries: To inquire into and provide advice on such economic, trade and tariff issues as are referred to the Tribunal by the Governor in Council or the Minister of Finance
- Safeguard inquiries: To inquire into complaints by domestic producers that increased imports are causing, or threatening to cause, injury to domestic producers and, as directed, make recommendations to the Government on an appropriate remedy

== See also ==
- Canada Border Services Agency
- General Agreement on Tariffs and Trade (GATT)
- Import, export, tariff, subsidy
- World Trade Organization
