= Quasi-judicial proceeding =

A quasi-judicial proceeding is a trial that adopts the form of a judicial process without a formal basis in law.

== Origins ==
The word 'quasi' consists of two Latin words: Quam + Si. Quam, in Latin, means ‘as much as’ and Si means ‘if.’ The prefix ‘quasi’ connotes the meaning – ‘similar to but not exactly the same as.’ Thus, quasi-judicial proceedings are similar to but not exactly court proceedings. The term also implies that these authorities are not routinely responsible for holding such proceedings and often may have other duties.

In short, an administrative function is called ‘quasi-judicial’ when there is an obligation to assume a judicial approach and to comply with the basic requirements of natural justice. Thus, the fundamental purpose of a quasi-judicial hearing is to provide the affected parties due process. Due process requires notice of the proceedings and an opportunity to be heard.

== Elements ==
1. Adequate Notice
2. Impartial Hearing Officer
3. Right to be represented by or through counsel
4. Right to Confront Parties and Witnesses
5. Right to Compel production of Evidences
6. Right to have findings of facts and law, and explicit reasons for the decision (speaking order)
7. Right to Judicial Review

== See also ==
- Nuremberg trials
- Quasi-judicial body
