= Telangana State Women Commission =

Statutory body for women's rights, India

Telangana State Commission for Women
Statutory body overview
- Formed: 15 October 2004
- Jurisdiction: Telangana, India
- Headquarters: 2nd Floor, South Block, Buddha Bhavan, Ranigunj, Secunderabad-500003.
- Statutory body executive: Vacant, Chairperson
- Website: Official Website

Telangana State Women Commission is a statutory body constituted in the year 1993 to deal with the issues relating to crime against women in the state of Telangana. The commission for welfare of women in the state was set up by Telangana Government as a quasi-judicial body.

== History and objectives ==
Telangana State Commission for Women was formed to investigate specific problems relating to women and apart from studying women related issues from the state. The Commission is equipped with powers to safeguard rights of women and ensure their protection and equality against any form of harassment and issues faced in the family and community.

The commission was created with the following objectives:

- Ensuring protection and welfare of women.
- Handle gender-based issues through timely intervention in case of any violation of relevant laws or opportunity denial or depriving the women of any rights.
- Recommending to state government on women-based issues.
- The commission occasionally takes steps to create awareness in public regarding the women-based legislation in the state.

Telangana State Women Commission had activated number 181 as state's women helpline number and started SHE teams initiative.

== Composition ==
Telangana State Commission for Women was formed with a chairperson and other members. The social welfare department of the state makes modalities for appointing the Chairman of the State Commission for Women. Their salary and other emoluments are fixed by state government and revised from time to time.

Smt.Vakiti Sunitha Lakshma Reddy is the Chairperson of the Telangana State Commission for Women. She along with other members will hold office for a period of 3 years.

== Activities ==
Telangana State Commission for Women was formed in 2006 to perform below activities:

- Commission should ensure that it adheres to the provision and protection guaranteed for women under Constitution of India and women related legislations.
- In case any agency in the state fails to implement protective measures against women, getting the same to the notice of Government.
- Making recommendations for the amendments in any law if it fails on provision of justice to the women of the state.
- Taking up with concerned authorities any issue of violation of women's rights and recommending follow-up action to them.
- Women who have complaints of violation of their rights and non-implementation of their protective measures guaranteed under the Constitution of India can directly approach Women Commission for redressal.
- Counselling and assisting women who are victims of atrocities and discrimination in the state.
- Financing litigation expenses for any issues involving mass group of women and occasionally make reports to the state government relating to them.
- Inspecting any premises, jail or other remand home where women prisoners are lodged or any other case and bringing them to the notice of respective authorities, in case of need.
- Enquire, study and investigate any specific women-based issues.
- Initiate educational research or undertaking any promotional method and recommend ways for ensuring women representation in all areas and identifying reasons depriving them of their rights.
- To enquire suo-moto or any complaints of any issue which deprives women of their rights or women protection laws not being implemented or noncompliance of any policies relating to them or failure of following instructions relating to women welfare and relief associated with them.

== Criticism ==
Several media reports have documented criticism of the Telangana State Commission for Women by political leaders over its handling of certain issues. In March 2025, leaders of the Bharat Rashtra Samithi (BRS) alleged that the commission had not responded to what they described as objectionable remarks made by members of the state government, while issuing notices in other cases. Speaking to the media, former minister Sabitha Indra Reddy questioned the commission’s response to incidents of violence against women in the state, citing official crime figures and calling for greater intervention. The commission did not publicly respond to the allegations at the time.

== See also ==
- National Commission for Women
