= Mamta Sharma (politician) =

Indian politician

Ex MLA Mamta Sharma
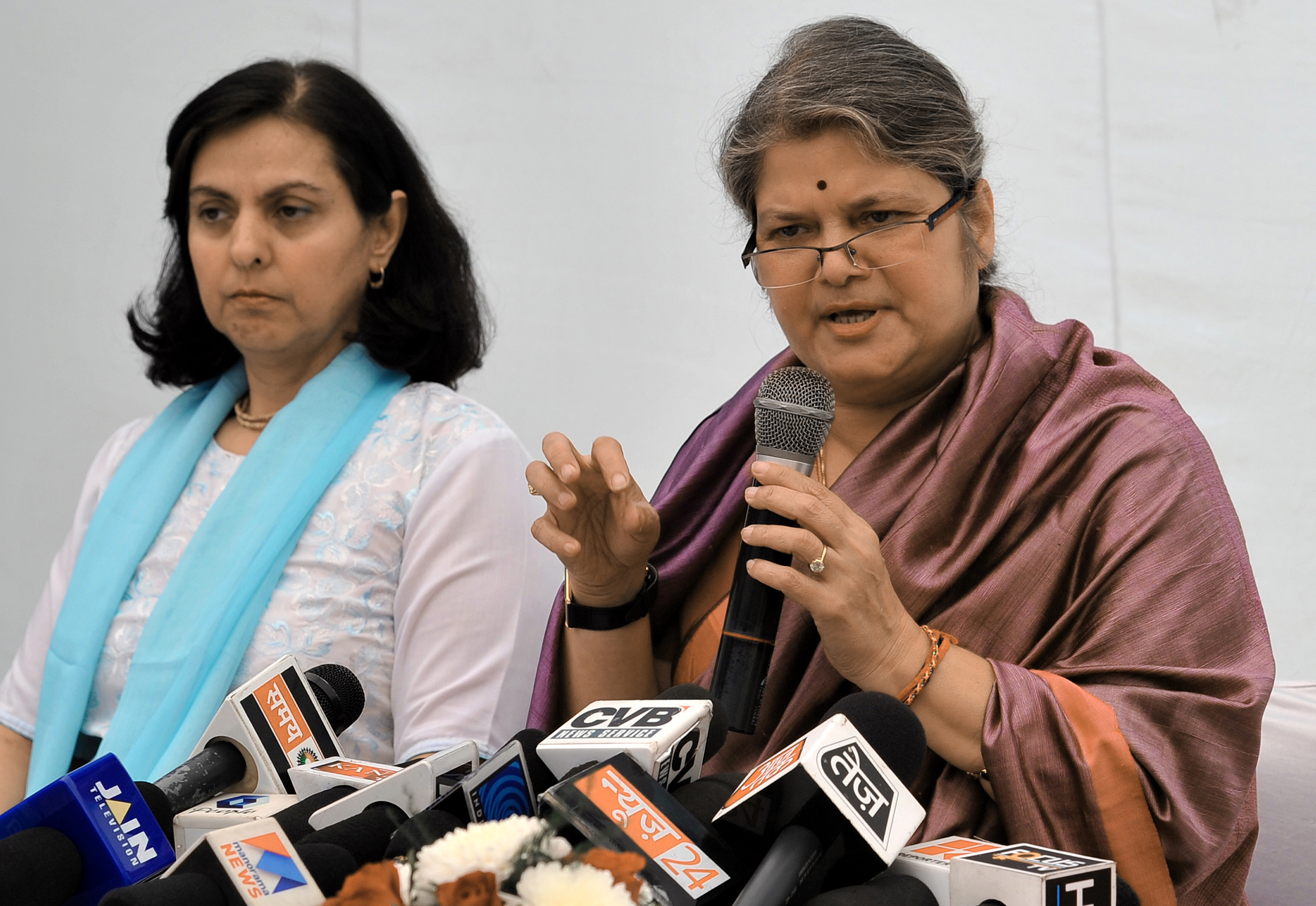
- Sharma addressing a press conference in 2011

Chairperson National Commission for Women
- In office 2011–2014

Member Rajasthan Legislative Assembly
- In office 1998–2003

Personal details
- Party: Indian National Congress

Mamta Sharma is an Indian politician and former chairperson of the National Commission for Women India.

== Political life ==
Sharma was a two term member of the Rajasthan Legislative Assembly winning from the Bundi constituency in 1998 and 2003 on an Indian National Congress ticket.
