= Tamil Nadu State Commission For Women =

Statutory body for women's rights, India

Tamil Nadu State Commission for Women
Commission overview
- Formed: 1993
- Jurisdiction: Tamil Nadu
- Headquarters: Kalas Mahal, 1st Floor, Chepauk, Chennai 600005
- Commission executive: Tmt. A. S. Kumari (as of January 2026), (Chairperson)
- Website: Official Website

Tamil Nadu State Commission for Women (TNSCW) is a statutory body established in 1993 to safeguard the rights of women and address crimes against them across the state. It is one of the departments of the Government of Tamil Nadu.

== See also ==
- Government of Tamil Nadu
- Tamil Nadu Government's Departments
