= Quasi-judicial body =

Non-judicial body which can interpret law

A quasi-judicial body is a non-judicial body which can interpret law. It is an entity such as an arbitration panel or tribunal board, which can be a public administrative agency (not part of the judicial branch of government) but also a contract- or private law entity, which has been given powers and procedures resembling those of a court of law or judge and which is obliged to objectively determine facts and draw conclusions from them so as to provide the basis of an official action. Such actions are able to remedy a situation or impose legal penalties, and they may affect the legal rights, duties or privileges of specific parties.

== Powers ==
Such bodies usually have powers of adjudication in such matters as:

- breach of discipline
- conduct rules
- trust in the matters of money or otherwise
- commercial and investment disputes

Their powers are usually limited to a very specific area of expertise and authority, such as land use and zoning, financial markets, employment law, public standards, and/or a specific set of regulations of an agency.

The decisions of such a body are often made after a quasi-judicial proceeding, which may resemble a court.

== Differences from judicial bodies ==
There are some key differences between judicial and quasi-judicial bodies, in that:

- Judicial decisions are bound by precedent in common law, whereas quasi-judicial decisions usually are not so bound;
- In the absence of precedent in common law, judicial decisions may create new law, whereas quasi-judicial decisions must be based on conclusions of existing law;
- Quasi-judicial bodies need not always follow strict judicial rules of evidence and procedure;
- Quasi-judicial bodies must hold formal hearings only if mandated to do so under their governing laws, regulations or agreements;
- Quasi-judicial bodies, unlike courts, may be a party in a matter and issue a decision thereon at the same time, depending on the specifically governing rules.

== Decisions ==
In general, decisions of a quasi-judicial body require findings of facts to reach conclusions of law that justify the decision. They usually depend on a predetermined set of guidelines or criteria to assess the nature and gravity of the permission or relief sought, or of the offense committed. Decisions of a quasi-judicial body are often legally enforceable under the laws of a jurisdiction; they can be challenged in a court of law, which is the final decisive authority.

== List of quasi-judicial bodies ==
The following is a partial list of quasi-judicial bodies:

=== Canada ===
- Canadian International Trade Tribunal
- Canadian Transportation Agency
- Ontarian committees of adjustment
- Ontario Municipal Board
- Trademarks Opposition Board
- Canadian Nuclear Safety Commission

=== India ===
Some non-constitutional bodies that are quasi-judicial in nature:

- National Company Law Tribunal (NCLT)
- Central Administrative Tribunal (CAT)
- Income Tax Appellate Tribunal (ITAT)
- Assessing authorities under the Income Tax Laws
- Authorities O/o Chief Labour Commissioner (Central) posted in various states under Labour Laws
- National Human Rights Commission
- National Consumer Disputes Redressal Commission
- Competition Commission of India
- Appellate Tribunal for Electricity
- Railway Claims Tribunal
- Intellectual Property Appellate Tribunal
- Banking Ombudsman
- National Green Tribunal
- Central Information Commission
- Securities and Exchange Board of India (SEBI)
- Reserve Bank of India (RBI)
- Employees Provident Fund Organization
- Election Commission of India (ECI)
- Employees' state Insurance Corporation
- Juvenile Justice Board

=== United Kingdom ===
- Parades Commission
- Local planning committees
- Sheriffs Principal in Scotland
- Financial Services Authority

=== United States ===
- Civil Aeronautics Board (defunct as of 1985)
- United States Merit Systems Protection Board
- Commercial Fisheries Entry Commission
- Californian planning commissions
- California Coastal Commission
- Federal Aviation Administration
- US Patent & Trademark Office including the Patent Trial and Appeal Board
- Local Zoning Board of Appeals
- National Labor Relations Board
- Equal Employment Opportunity Commission
- Federal Election Commission
- Federal Trade Commission
- International Trade Commission

=== Other ===
- Parole boards
- Commission of Inquiry
- United Nations Human Rights Committee
- Court of Arbitration for Sport
- Philippines Commission on Elections
- National Privacy Commission (Philippines)
- European Patent Office
- National Labor Relations Commission
- New Zealand's Broadcasting Standards Authority
- Botswana Communications Regulatory Authority
- Chief District Officer of Nepal
- Federal Judicial Administration Council (Ethiopia)
- African Commission on Human and Peoples' Rights
- World Trade Organization Dispute Settlement
