= List of LGBTQ literary awards =

A list of literary awards for LGBTQ literature and books with queer content. This page uses the following acronyms, all of which may be considered synonymous:

- LGBT: Lesbian, gay, bisexual, transgender
- LGBT+: Lesbian, gay, bisexual, transgender, and other queer identities
- LGBTQ: Lesbian, gay, bisexual, transgender, queer / questioning
- LGBTQIA: Lesbian, gay, bisexual, transgender, queer/ questioning, intersex, asexual

== Awards ==
| Sponsor | Award / Category | Awarded to | Years active |
|---|---|---|---|
| The Alice B Readers Appreciation Committee | The Alice B Readers Award | For living writers who have consistently produced well-written stories and novels about lesbians. | 2004–present |
| American Library Association's Rainbow Round Table | Over the Rainbow Book List | Books for adult readers with "commendable literary quality and significant, authentic [LGBTQIA+)] content" | 2011–present |
| American Library Association's Rainbow Round Table | Rainbow Book List | Books celebrating LGBTQIA+ youth and families, for readers from birth to age 18 | 2008–present |
| American Library Association's Rainbow Round Table | Stonewall Book Award (SBA) | Books of exceptional merit relating to the LGBTQIA+ experience. Split into further awards in 1990 and 2010. | 1971–present |
| American Library Association's Rainbow Round Table | SBA - Barbara Gittings Literature Award | Stonewall Book Award, literature category | 1990–present |
| American Library Association's Rainbow Round Table | SBA - Israel Fishman Non-Fiction Award | Stonewall Book Award, non-fiction category | 1990–present |
| American Library Association's Rainbow Round Table | SBA - Mike Morgan and Larry Romans Children’s and Young Adult Literature Award | Stonewall Book Award, children and young adult literature category | 2010–present |
| Association for Queer Anthropology | Ruth Benedict Prize | For anthropology books about LGBTQ topics | 1986–present |
| Bi Writers Association | Bisexual Book Awards | Best works of literature addressing themes of bisexuality | 2013–present |
| Blue Metropolis | Blue Metropolis Violet Prize | Established LGBTQ writer to honour their body of work | 2018–present |
| Dwijen Dinanath Arts Foundation's Rainbow Awards | Fiction of the Year | Novels, graphic novels or collections of short stories authored by a single author that is an "exemplary" affirmative work on the lives of sexual and gender minorities. | 2023–present |
| Dwijen Dinanath Arts Foundation's Rainbow Awards | Non-fiction of the Year | Memoirs, biographies, history or other non-fictional works that is an "exemplary" affirmative work on the lives of sexual and gender minorities. | 2023–present |
| Dwijen Dinanath Arts Foundation's Rainbow Awards | Feature of the Year | Feature story that is an "exemplary" affirmative work on the lives of sexual and gender minorities. | 2023–present |
| Dwijen Dinanath Arts Foundation's Rainbow Awards | Op-Ed of the Year | An op-ed piece that is an "exemplary" affirmative work on the lives of sexual and gender minorities. | 2023–present |
| Dwijen Dinanath Arts Foundation's Rainbow Awards | Lifetime Achievement Award | Profound contributions to the queer literary world. | 2023–present |
| Gaylactic Spectrum Awards Foundation | Best novel | Science fiction, fantasy, and horror works that explore LGBT topics in a positive way. Split into categories for novels, short fiction, and other texts. | 1999–present |
| Gaylactic Spectrum Awards Foundation | Best short fiction | Science fiction, fantasy, and horror works that explore LGBT topics in a positive way. Split into categories for novels, short fiction, and other texts. | 1999–present |
| Gaylactic Spectrum Awards Foundation | Best other work | Science fiction, fantasy, and horror works that explore LGBT topics in a positive way. Split into categories for novels, short fiction, and other texts. | 1999–present |
| Glamour | Prix République du Glamour | French novels with lesbian content | |
| Golden Crown Literary Society's Goldie Awards | Ann Bannon Award | Book selected as a favorite among Golden Crown Literary Society members | 2007–present |
| Golden Crown Literary Society's Goldie Awards | Contemporary Romance | Modern novel with a focus on a lesbian relationship: split into categories for short, mid-length, and long novels.: Formerly "Romance / Erotic Love Stories," established in 2005, then "Romance" in 2007 | |
| Golden Crown Literary Society's Goldie Awards | Debut Authors | Debut novel with lesbian content | 2006–present |
| Golden Crown Literary Society's Goldie Awards | Directors Award | Golden Crown Literary Society member for contribution to the Society | |
| Golden Crown Literary Society's Goldie Awards | Erotic Novels | Novel with a "high level of sexual content" between women: Formally "Romance / Erotic Love Stories," established in 2005 | 2007–present |
| Golden Crown Literary Society's Goldie Awards | Fiction Anthology/Collections | Anthologies with significant lesbian content | |
| Golden Crown Literary Society's Goldie Awards | General Fiction | Novel with lesbian content that is not the main focus of the book: Formally "Dramatic / General Fiction," established in 2007 | 2007–present |
| Golden Crown Literary Society's Goldie Awards | Historical Fiction | Novel set at least 25 years in the past with lesbian content that is not the main focus of the book | |
| Golden Crown Literary Society's Goldie Awards | Humorous Novels | Comedic novels with lesbian content | |
| Golden Crown Literary Society's Goldie Awards | Mystery/Thriller/Crime | Mystery, thriller, or crime novel with lesbian content | 2005–present |
| Golden Crown Literary Society's Goldie Awards | New Adult Fiction | Novels with lesbian content whose target audience is people aged 19–29 | |
| Golden Crown Literary Society's Goldie Awards | Nonfiction | Nonfiction works with lesbian content | |
| Golden Crown Literary Society's Goldie Awards | Paranormal/Occult/Horror | Novels with paranormal, occult, or horror elements as part of the main plot that also include lesbian content | |
| Golden Crown Literary Society's Goldie Awards | Poetry | Poetry with lesbian content | |
| Golden Crown Literary Society's Goldie Awards | Romantic Blend | Novels with two main focuses, one of which is a lesbian relationship | |
| Golden Crown Literary Society's Goldie Awards | Science Fiction/Fantasy | Science fiction or fantasy novels with lesbian content | 2005–present |
| Golden Crown Literary Society's Goldie Awards | Short Story/Essay Collections | | 2007- |
| Golden Crown Literary Society's Goldie Awards | Speculative Fiction | | 2007- |
| Golden Crown Literary Society's Goldie Awards | Young Adult | Young adult novels with lesbian content | |
| Golden Crown Literary Society's Goldie Awards | The Lee Lynch Classic Book Award | Classic books with lesbian content | |
| Golden Crown Literary Society's Goldie Awards | Tee Corinne Award for Outstanding Cover Design | Book with a cover selected as a favourite among Golden Crown Literary Society members | |
| Golden Crown Literary Society's Goldie Awards | Trailblazer Award | Writer in recognition of their lifetime achievement and contributions to lesbian literature | 2005–present |
| Japanese Association for Gender, Fantasy & Science Fiction | Sense of Gender Awards | Science fiction or fantasy fiction that best explores and deepens the concept of gender | 2001–present |
| Green Carnation Committee in association with Foyles | Green Carnation Prize | Books by LGBTQ writers in the UK. | 2014-2017 |
| Lambda Literary Foundation's Lambda Literary Awards | J. Michael Samuel Prize for Emerging Writers Over 50 | Authors who identify as LGBTQ who published their first book after the age of 50 | |
| Lambda Literary Foundation's Lambda Literary Awards | Jeanne Córdova Prize for Lesbian/Queer Nonfiction | Nonfiction authors who identify as lesbian or queer or who are transgender or gender non-conforming | |
| Lambda Literary Foundation's Lambda Literary Awards | Jim Duggins, PhD Outstanding Mid-Career Novelist Prize | Authors who identify as LGBTQ and have published multiple well-received novels, seeming likely to publish more | |
| Lambda Literary Foundation's Lambda Literary Awards | Judith A. Markowitz Award for Exceptional New LGBTQ Writers | Writers who identify as LGBTQ and have published one or two books, showing promise for their future writing careers | |
| Lambda Literary Foundation's Lambda Literary Awards | AIDS Literature | Texts with HIV/AIDS content | (discontinued) |
| Lambda Literary Foundation's Lambda Literary Awards | Anthology | Anthologies with LGBT+ content. Previously divided into categories for anthologies about various LGBT identities. | |
| Lambda Literary Foundation's Lambda Literary Awards | Arts and Culture | | (discontinued) |
| Lambda Literary Foundation's Lambda Literary Awards | Belles Lettres | Works of Belles-lettres | (discontinued) |
| Lambda Literary Foundation's Lambda Literary Awards | Children's or Young Adult Literature | Children's and young adult texts with LGBT+ content | |
| Lambda Literary Foundation's Lambda Literary Awards | Debut Fiction | Debut fictional texts with LGBT+ content. Previously was divided into gay and lesbian debut fiction categories. | (discontinued) |
| Lambda Literary Foundation's Lambda Literary Awards | Drama | Drama with LGBT+ content | |
| Lambda Literary Foundation's Lambda Literary Awards | Editor's Choice | | (discontinued) |
| Lambda Literary Foundation's Lambda Literary Awards | Fiction: Bisexual Fiction; Gay Fiction; Lesbian Fiction; Transgender Fiction | Fictional texts with LGBT+ content, often divided into categories based on identity. | |
| Lambda Literary Foundation's Lambda Literary Awards | Graphic Novel | Graphic novels with LGBT+ content | |
| Lambda Literary Foundation's Lambda Literary Awards | Humor | Humorous texts with LGBT+ content | (discontinued) |
| Lambda Literary Foundation's Lambda Literary Awards | Memoir or Biography: Gay Memoir/Biography; Lesbian Memoir/Biography | Memoirs or biographies with LGBT+ content | |
| Lambda Literary Foundation's Lambda Literary Awards | Mystery: Gay Mystery; Lesbian Mystery | Mystery texts with LGBT+ content | |
| Lambda Literary Foundation's Lambda Literary Awards | Nonfiction | Nonfiction texts with LGBT+ content, sometimes split into categories based on identity | |
| Lambda Literary Foundation's Lambda Literary Awards | Poetry: Gay Poetry; Lesbian Poetry | Poetry with LGBT+ content, sometimes split into categories based on identity. | |
| Lambda Literary Foundation's Lambda Literary Awards | Romance & Erotica: Gay Romance; Lesbian Romance | Works of romance and erotica with LGBTQ+ content, sometimes divided into separate categories based on romance, erotica, or specific LGBTQ identities | |
| Lambda Literary Foundation's Lambda Literary Awards | LGBTQ+ Studies | Academic texts with LGBTQ+ content, sometimes split into categories by identity | |
| Lambda Literary Foundation's Lambda Literary Awards | Photography/Visual Arts | Photography and visual art works with LGBT+ content | (discontinued) |
| Lambda Literary Foundation's Lambda Literary Awards | Speculative Fiction | Science fiction, fantasy, or horror texts with LGBTQ+ content. Sometimes split into categories based on gay or lesbian identity. | |
| Lambda Literary Foundation's Lambda Literary Awards | Transgender Literature | Works with transgender content | |
| Lambda Literary Foundation's Lambda Literary Awards | Randall Kenan Prize for Black LGBTQ Fiction | Black LGBTQ fiction writers | |
| Lambda Literary Foundation's Lambda Literary Awards | Trustee Award | Individuals who have broken new ground in the field of LGBTQ literature, publishing, filmmaking, journalism, playwriting, etc. | |
| Lambda Literary Foundation's Lambda Literary Awards | Visionary Award | Individuals who have broken new ground in the field of LGBTQ literature and publishing. | |
| Lesfic Bard Awards, LLC | Lesfic Bard Awards | Awards for lesbian writers. A triple-blind judging process is used to determine finalists and winners. | 2018–present |
| Otherwise Award | Otherwise Award (formerly The James Tiptree Jr. Award) | Works of science fiction or fantasy that expand or explore one's understanding of gender. Awarded yearly at WisCon. | 1991–present |
| Polari Salon | Polari Children's and YA Prize | Books on LGBTQ+ themes by authors from the UK and Ireland. | 2022– |
| Polari Salon | Polari First Book Prize | Books on LGBTQ+ themes by authors from the UK and Ireland. | 2011– |
| Polari Salon | Polari Book Prize | Books on LGBTQ+ themes by authors from the UK and Ireland. | 2019– |
| Publishing Triangle | Audre Lorde Award | Lesbian poetry | |
| Publishing Triangle | Betty Berzon Award for Emerging Writers | Early career achievement of an LGBT+ writer | |
| Publishing Triangle | Bill Whitehead Award | Lifetime achievement by writers within the LGBT community | |
| Publishing Triangle | Edmund White Award | Debut novels by writers within the LGBT community | |
| Publishing Triangle | Ferro-Grumley Award | Fiction with LGBT content | |
| Publishing Triangle | Judy Grahn Award | Works of non-fiction of relevance to the lesbian community | |
| Publishing Triangle | Leslie Feinberg Award | Works of literature on transgender themes | |
| Publishing Triangle | Randy Shilts Award | Works of non-fiction of relevance to the gay community | |
| Publishing Triangle | Robert Chesley Award | Works by playwrights in the LGBT community | |
| Publishing Triangle | Thom Gunn Award | Works of gay male poetry | |
| Writers' Trust of Canada | Dayne Ogilvie Prize | Emerging LGBT+ Canadian writer | |

== See also ==
- List of American Library Association awards
- Lambda Literary Awards
- List of LGBTQ-related awards
