= Boris Dittrich =

Dutch politician (born 1955)

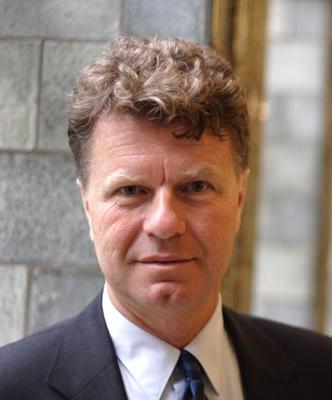
- Dittrich in 2007

Member of the Senate
- Incumbent
- Assumed office 11 June 2019

Leader of the Democrats 66
- In office 22 January 2003 – 3 February 2006
- Preceded by: Thom de Graaf
- Succeeded by: Alexander Pechtold

Leader of the Democrats 66 in the House of Representatives
- In office 22 January 2003 – 3 February 2006
- Preceded by: Thom de Graaf
- Succeeded by: Lousewies van der Laan

Member of the House of Representatives
- In office 17 May 1994 – 30 November 2006

Personal details
- Born: Boris Ottokar Dittrich; 21 July 1955 (age 71) Utrecht, Netherlands
- Party: Democrats 66 (since 1981)
- Spouse: Jehoshua Rozenman (m. 2006)
- Education: Leiden University (Bachelor of Laws, Master of Laws)
- Occupation: Politician · Jurist · Lawyer · Judge · Activist · Political pundit · Author · Professor

Boris Ottokar Dittrich (Dutch pronunciation: [ˈboːrɪz ˈditrix]; (Note: Boris in isolation: [ˈboːrɪs].) born 21 July 1955) is a Dutch politician, jurist, author and human rights activist who served as Leader of the Democrats 66 (D66) from 2003 to 2006. A former member of the House of Representatives (1994–2006), he has been a member of the Senate since 2019.

Dittrich's father came to the Netherlands as a political asylum seeker from Czechoslovakia in 1948; he became a professor in Eastern European history at Utrecht University. Boris Dittrich grew up in Utrecht and went to law school at Leiden University, working as a lawyer in Amsterdam from 1981 until 1989 and later as a judge in the district court of Alkmaar from 1989 until 1994. Dittrich is married to the Dutch-Israeli sculptor Jehoshua Rozenman.

== Career ==
=== Parliamentary career ===
In 1994 Dittrich became a member of the House of Representatives representing the social-liberal party Democrats 66 (D66).

Dittrich rose to become D66 party leader in 2003 after Thom de Graaf stepped down because of disappointing results in the 2003 general election.

Dittrich negotiated the participation of D66 in the second Balkenende cabinet with the Christian Democratic Appeal and the People's Party for Freedom and Democracy. He decided not to become a minister but to remain party leader in Parliament in order to monitor how the new government would execute the coalition agreement. The new government introduced major reforms to which the staggering Dutch economy responded positively.

Dittrich was strongly against Dutch military participation in the Afghan province of Uruzgan and he tried to persuade both the government and Parliament not to get involved in the war. However, when the cabinet (including his own D66 ministers) decided to follow the American lead under President Bush, backed by three quarters of the Dutch Parliament, he decided to take political responsibility and stepped down as Leader of the D66 on 3 February 2006. A few months later D66 withdrew its support from the government after three years because of a dispute with minister for integration and asylum affairs Rita Verdonk about the way she handled the issue of the Dutch passport of Ayaan Hirsi Ali. D66 and the minister had had a number of clashes before because of her harsh policy towards asylum seekers and immigrants. This withdrawal caused the fall of the government and a snap election was announced for November 2006.

Dittrich was a highly productive parliamentarian; he is the first member ever to have drafted four different private member's bills that have successfully become law. Dittrich took the initiative for laws against stalking; for the rights of victims to speak during a criminal trial; for abolishing the time limits on prosecution of crimes like murder and manslaughter; and he wrote the law to fix book prices in order to protect smaller bookshops, authors and customers.

During his career, Dittrich became a national figure for his initiatives on issues like same-sex marriage, euthanasia, legalisation of specific forms of sex work, and decriminalising the use of soft drugs. These are issues that have made the Netherlands leading when it comes to this kind of legislation in the world. Dittrich was the first openly gay member of Parliament who focused on LGBT rights (Evelien Eshuis from the Dutch Communist Party being the first openly lesbian member of Parliament who worked for LGBT rights in the 1980s). In 1994 he proposed to introduce same-sex marriage to the dismay of the Dutch LGBTQ organisation COC. The group later changed course. Dittrich and two colleagues embarked on a long campaign. In spite of fierce opposition from religious groups, the Netherlands became the first country in the world to introduce same-sex marriage. He is a strong advocate for human rights and represented the Dutch Parliament on numerous occasions at meetings in the United Nations. Dittrich was a member of the Parliamentarians for Global Action (PGA) and was also vice president of Liberal International until October 2007.

After twelve and a half years in Parliament, Dittrich decided to work outside national politics. He continued in his role as a member of Parliament until the 22 November 2006 general election.

=== Post-parliamentary career ===
In early 2007 Dittrich became Advocacy Director of the Lesbian, Gay, Bisexual & Transgender (LGBT) Rights Program at Human Rights Watch in the Headquarters of the non-governmental organization in New York City.

Dittrich worked on different levels to achieve non-discrimination and equal rights for LGBT people. On a national level he supports grass roots organizations to achieve the goals they set out in their country specific context. For instance when groups in Cameroon asked Human Rights Watch to research the effects of the law that criminalizes homosexual conduct in that country. The research resulted in a joint report that Dittrich and the groups’ representatives discussed at a national level with the Cameroonian prime minister, minister of Justice, members of Parliament, and other stakeholders. On an international level Dittrich presented the findings from the report on Cameroon to the UN Human Rights Committee in Geneva.

In New York he co-organized yearly events at the United Nations to celebrate International Human Rights Day on December 10. In 2007 he chaired the event that introduced the Yogyakarta Principles to the UN in New York. The 2008 event introduced a joint statement by 66 countries to denounce violence and discrimination against people because of their sexual orientation or gender identity. In 2009 the Holy See took the floor and called upon the more than 76 countries in the world to decriminalize homosexual conduct. The events became increasingly important. In 2010 and 2012 former UN secretary-general Ban Ki Moon gave the opening address. In all events human rights defenders from different parts of the world shared their personal stories about how discriminatory laws and practices influenced their lives. In most cases also positive examples of activism were given to inspire the hundreds of attending diplomats.

Mid 2013 Dittrich moved from New York to Berlin, Germany where he continued to work as global advocacy director of the LGBT Rights Program at Human Rights Watch until October 2018.

=== Renewed political career ===
In 2019 Dittrich was elected as senator in the Dutch Senate for his political party D66. His four-year term started on June 11. Dittrich was chosen First Vice-President of the Senate on 14 October 2025.

== Honors ==
In 2006, then Queen Beatrix granted Dittrich Knighthood in the Order of Orange-Nassau for his political work.

In 2012 he received the Bob Angelo Medal, an award from the Nederlandse Vereniging tot Integratie van Homoseksualiteit COC for defending the rights of lesbians, gays, bisexual and transgender people.

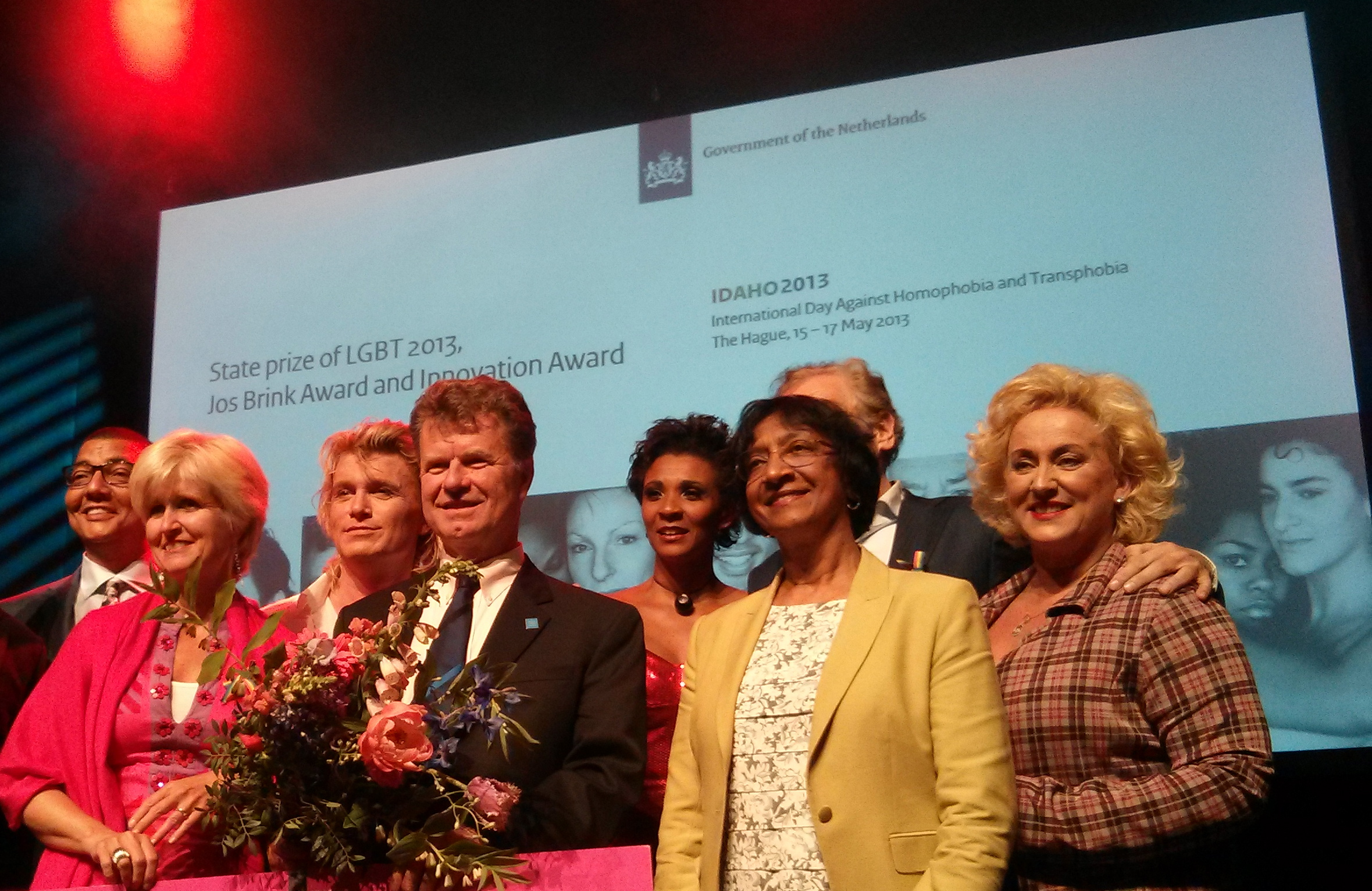
Boris Dittrich, advocacy director for the Lesbian, Gay, Bisexual, and Transgender Rights Program at Human Rights Watch, at the reception for the Jos Brink Award and Innovation Award in The Hague, The Netherlands, on May 17, 2013. Together with the UN High Commissioner for Human Rights, Ms Navi Pillay

On the International Day Against Homophobia (IDAHO) May 17, 2013 Dittrich received the national Jos Brink Award from the Dutch government for his activism on LGBT rights during three decades. Navi Pillay, former UN High Commissioner for Human Rights, attended the celebration in The Hague. In her speech she highlighted the worldwide UN led campaign against homophobia and transphobia called "Free and Equal".

In 2013 Dittrich also received a golden pin (Gouden Wimpel) on behalf of the Dutch Postcode Lottery for his LGBT work for Human Rights Watch. The pin was given to him in Kenya, while on a field trip with Kenyan LGBT activists, by Winston Gerschtanowitz the ambassador of the Postcode Lottery.

In 2019 Dittrich received the ‘Living Legend Award’ from the organization Workplace Pride in the Netherlands and the Jillis Bruggeman Penning from the city of Schiedam for his work promoting LGBT rights.

=== Decorations ===
Honours
Ribbon bar	Honour	Country	Date	Comment
	Knight of the Order of Orange-Nassau	Netherlands	29 November 2006	

== Guest lecturing ==
While working for Human Rights Watch Dittrich has been a guest lecturer about human rights law and sexual orientation/gender identity at many universities, among which:

- Harvard University;
- Yale University;
- Columbia University;
- Berkeley University;
- University of Chicago;
- Johns Hopkins University
- University of Amsterdam, Utrecht, Leiden, Groningen, Nijmegen;
- Meiji University, Tokyo;
- Rikkyo University, Tokyo;
- University of Sydney;
- University of Auckland;
- Cork University, Ireland;
- Hoa Sen University, Ho Chi Minh City, Vietnam;
- Chinese University of Hong Kong;
- University of Aruba

== Books ==
Dittrich is the author of eight books:

- ‘Een blauwe stoel in Paars’, stories about his work as member of parliament (including a chapter on the same-sex marriage legislation, and on his laws on stalking and cancellation of term limits in relation to murder and manslaughter) Van Gennep Publishers, Amsterdam 2001.
- ‘Elke Liefde Telt’, about Dittrich's work around the globe for Human Rights Watch, Nieuw Amsterdam Publishers 2009.
- ‘Moord en Brand', a thriller about politics and journalism in the Hague, Nieuw Amsterdam Publishers 2011.
- 'De Waarheid liegen’, a novel about a murder at Grand Central's subway station in New York, de Arbeiderspers Publishers 2013.
- 'W.O.L.F.’, a literary thriller against the backdrop of the rise of the extreme right in Berlin, Germany, published by De Bezige Bij/Cargo in 2016. This book was chosen as best Dutch thriller of 2016 by the Vrij Nederland Thriller and Detective Guide.
- 'HALSZAAK’, a literary thriller about a judge who loses it after several sentences that were heavily criticized, published by De Bezige Bij/Cargo in 2017.
- 'BARST’. The CPNB (collective of publishers, bookstores, distributors) choose Dittrich to write the 2018 gift book for the Thriller and Detective Weeks in June. 330,000 copies of BARST were published.
- 'De Wereld rond met Boris Dittrich’, published in 2019. This is a collection of columns he wrote for the Dutch Magazine VertrekNL. Publisher: Uitgeverij Personalia.

== Notes ==
Party political offices
Preceded by Thom de Graaf	Leader of the Democrats 66; 2003–2006	Succeeded by Alexander Pechtold
Preceded by Thom de Graaf	Parliamentary leader of the Democrats 66 in the House of Representatives; 2003–2006	Succeeded by Lousewies van der Laan
