= 1st Rainbow Awards =

2023 LGBTQ literary awards ceremony

- Date: December 10, 2023
- Venue: Rainbow Lit Fest, Gulmohar Park, New Delhi
- Country: India
- Presented by: Dwijen Dinanath Arts Foundation
- Website: therainbowawards.in

The 1st Rainbow Awards ceremony was held at Rainbow Lit Fest, Gulmohar Park, New Delhi on 10 December 2023. It celebrated writers from 1 January 2022 and journalists from 1 June 2022, both until 31 May 2023.

== Jury ==
The nine-member jury composed of following members evaluated the submissions and decide on the award winners. Rohin Bhatt, queer rights activist, lawyer and bioethicist, served as a co-coordinator.

- Adrija Bose, editor
- Alka Pande, art historian and writer
- Anish Gawande, co-found of the Pink List India
- Jyotsna Siddharth, artist and writer
- Kalki Subramaniam, activist, artist and writer
- Parvati Sharma, writer
- Poonam Saxena, writer and translator
- Sindhu Rajasekaran, writer and researcher

== Winners and nominees ==
=== Lifetime Achievement Award ===
Hoshang Merchant, a Hyderabad-based poet and professor best known for his anthology Yaraana, was honoured with Lifetime Achievement Award.

=== Literature ===
Fiction of the Year: Entering the Maze: Queer Fiction of Krishnagopal Mallick by Niladri R. Chatterjee (Niyogi Books); Tell Me How to Be by Neel Patel (Flatiron Books); The Woman Who Climbed Trees by Smriti Ravindra (HarperVia)	Non-fiction of the Year: Footprints of a Queer History: Life-stories from Gujarat by Maya Sharma (Yoda Press); I Am Onir and I am Gay by Onir with Irene Dhar Malik (Penguin Random House); Homeless: Growing Up Lesbian and Dyslexic in India by K Vaishali (Simon & Schuster)

=== Journalism ===
Feature of the Year: Brahmin Men Who Love to Eat A** by Akhil Kang (Decolonizing Sexualities Network); The Horrors of Queer Conversion Therapy in India by Nolina Minj (Scroll); Seen-Unseen by Riddhi Dastidar (Queer Beat)	Op-Ed of the Year: Queering Translation: Locating Queerness in Indian Languages by Chittajit Mitra (Hindustan Times); Why Saurabh Kirpal Needs to Be Appointed as Judge? by Kinshuk Gupta (The Indian Express); Though Homosexuality Has Been Decriminalised, Two Incidents in Pune Show How Bias Still Prevails by R Raj Rao (Scroll)

== See also ==
- List of LGBT-related awards
- 34th GLAAD Media Awards
