= 2nd Rainbow Awards =

2024 LGBTQ literary awards ceremony

- Date: December 2024
- Venue: Rainbow Lit Fest, Gulmohar Park, New Delhi
- Country: India
- Presented by: Dwijen Dinanath Arts Foundation
- Website: therainbowawards.in

The 2nd Rainbow Awards ceremony is to be held at Rainbow Lit Fest, Gulmohar Park, New Delhi in December 2024. It intends to celebrate the work published between 1 June 2023 and 31 May 2024.

== Jury ==
The nine-member jury, composed of the following members will evaluate the submissions and decide on the award winners.

- Parvati Sharma, writer
- Poonam Saxena, journalist, writer and translator
- Niladri R. Chatterjee: Professor
- Dhamini Ratnam, journalist and editor
- Ashlin Mathew, journalist
- Aroh Akunth, founder of Dalit Queer Project
- Sindhu Rajasekaran, author, filmmaker and academic
- Sayantan Datta, journalist and Assistant Professor

== Winners and nominees ==
=== Lifetime Achievement Award ===
Minakshi Sanyal, a cofounder of the nonprofit Sappho for Equality. The organization focuses on queer issues and is located in Kolkata.

=== Literature ===
Fiction of the Year: Cockatoo by Yashraj Goswami; A House of Rain and Snow by Maharghya Chakraborty; trans. Srijato Bandopodhyay; Mahmud and Ayaz by R. Raj Rao	Non-fiction of the Year: The Grammar of My Body by Abhishek Anicca; Mental Health Journey: Untold Stories of People from the Northeast of India, ed. Kumam Davidson Singh; The Yellow Sparrow by Santa Khurai

=== Journalism ===
Feature of the Year "Everyone Accepts Me The Way I Am" by Smitha Tumuluru	Op-Ed of the Year "Where do the quiet gays go?" by Shruti Sunderraman

== See also ==
- List of LGBT-related awards
- 35th GLAAD Media Awards
