= List of LGBTQ-related awards =

List of awards

This list of LGBTQ-related awards is an index to articles on notable awards related to LGBTQIA+ (lesbian, gay, bisexual, transgender and queer) media, competitions, film and literature.

== General ==
Country	Award	Sponsor	Description	Ref.
Netherlands	Annie Brouwer-Korf Award	City of Utrecht	Annual city award since 2007 for people or organizations that are particularly committed to the emancipation and acceptance of LGBTQIA+.	
United States	Brenda Howard Memorial Award	Queens Chapter of PFLAG	Recognizes an individual whose work for the bisexual and LGBTQ communities best exemplifies the vision, principles, and community service exemplified by Brenda Howard.	
United Kingdom	British LGBT Awards	SPM Group	Individuals and organisations that have demonstrated an outstanding commitment to the LGBTQ+ community.	
United States	Brudner Prize	Yale University	Lifetime accomplishment and scholarly contributions in the field of Lesbian, Gay, Bisexual, and Transgender Studies (LGBTS)	
China	China Rainbow Media Awards	Aibai Culture & Education Center, Beijing Gender Health Education Institute	Media artisans and publication outlets for their coverage or featuring of lesbian, gay, bisexual and transgender people in the People's Republic of China	
Germany	Felix-Rexhausen Award	Bund Lesbischer und Schwuler JournalistInnen	Mainstream media for their fair, accurate and inclusive representations of the LGBT community and the issues that affect their lives	
United States	GLAAD Media Award	GLAAD	Various branches of the media for their outstanding representations of the LGBTQ community and the issues that affect their lives	
Netherlands	John Blankenstein Award	Municipal Council of The Hague	Significance of gay men and lesbian women participating and positioning themselves equally in society	
Netherlands	Jos Brink Award	Ministry of Education, Science and Culture	Every two years the Dutch government organizes since 2009 a life time award and innovation award for persons or organizations dedicated to the acceptance of lesbian, gay, bisexual, transgender, and intersex people	
United States	Miss Fag Hag Pageant	Hetrick-Martin Institute	Pageant contest for fag hags	
United States	NewNowNext Awards	Logo TV	LGBT-specific and general interest achievements in entertainment and pop culture	
United States	The Outies	Out & Equal	Individuals and organizations that are leaders in advancing equality for LGBT employees in America’s workplaces	
United States	Pill Awards	ADD-TV	Artists in the LGBT community	
Canada	PTP Pink Awards	Pink Triangle Press	Significant celebrity and community builders of the LGBTQ community in Canada	
Canada	Q Hall of Fame Canada	Q Hall of Fame	People who have greatly impacted the lives of LGBTQ Canadians through their dedication to human rights	
United States	Ruth Benedict Prize	American Anthropological Association	Excellence in a scholarly book written from an anthropological perspective about a lesbian, gay, bisexual, or transgender topic	
United Kingdom	Stonewall Awards	Stonewall	People who have affected the lives of British lesbian, gay, bi and trans people	
United States	VH1 Trailblazer Honors	Logo TV, VH1	Persons and entities who have made significant contributions towards minority empowerment and civil activism. It is the only televised LGBT awards ceremony in the United States.	

== Film ==
Country	Award	Sponsor	Description	Ref.
United States	Blatino Erotica Awards	Blatino Oasis	[Gay] men of African or Latino descent who either work in the adult entertainment industry or ... whose work ... is classified as erotic or sexy in nature	
United States	Cybersocket Web Awards	Cybersocket, Inc.	Gay porn websites	
United States	Dorian Awards	GALECA: The Society of LGBTQ Entertainment Critics	Finest in film and television accessible in the United States, as well as Broadway and Off-Broadway productions, across general and LGBTQ-centric categories	
United States	The Frameline Award	Frameline Film Festival	Major contribution to LGBTQ+ representation in film, television, or the media arts	
United States	GayVN Awards	AVN (magazine)	Work done in the gay pornographic industry	
United States	GLAAD Media Award	GLAAD	Outstanding representations of the LGBTQ community in media	
United States	Grabby Awards	Grab Magazine	Work done in the gay adult erotic video industry	
United Kingdom	Iris Prize	The Festivals Company	Film which is by, for, about or of interest to gay, lesbian, bisexual, transgender or intersex audiences	
Italy	Queer Lion	Venice Film Festival	Best Movie with LGBT Themes & Queer Culture	
Canada	Queer Louve	Festival du nouveau cinéma	LGBTQ-themed films screened at the FNC	
France	Queer Palm	Cannes Film Festival	LGBTQIA+-relevant films entered into the Cannes Film Festival	
Taiwan	Queermosa Awards	Taiwan International Queer Film Festival	LGBT film festival	
United States	Reel Affirmations	Reel Affirmations	LGBT films: Best Feature, Best Documentary, Best Male Short, and Best Female Short	
Spain	Sebastiane Award	San Sebastián International Film Festival	Film or documentary screened during San Sebastián International Film Festival that best reflects the values and reality of lesbians, gays, bisexuals and transgender people	
Germany	Teddy Award	Berlin International Film Festival	Films with LGBTQIA+ topics	

== Literary awards ==
Country	Award	Sponsor	Description	Ref.
United States	Alice B Readers Award	Alice B Readers Appreciation Committee	Living writers of lesbian fiction whose careers are distinguished by consistently well-written stories about lesbians	
United States	American Library Association Rainbow List	American Library Association	Books with significant gay, lesbian, bisexual, or transgender content, and which are aimed at youth, birth through age 18	
United States	Audre Lorde Award	Publishing Triangle	Works of lesbian poetry	
United States	Bill Whitehead Award	Publishing Triangle	Lifetime achievement by writers within the LGBTQ community	
United States	Bisexual Book Awards	Bi Writers Association	Best works of literature addressing themes of bisexuality	
Canada	Blue Metropolis Violet Prize	Blue Metropolis	To an established LGBTQ writer to honour their body of work	
Canada	Dayne Ogilvie Prize	Writers' Trust of Canada	Emerging Canadian writer who is part of the lesbian, gay, bisexual, transgender, or queer community	
United States	Edmund White Award	Publishing Triangle	Debut novels by writers within the LGBTQ+ community	
United States	Ferro-Grumley Award	Publishing Triangle	Best work of LGBTQ fiction	
United States	Gaylactic Spectrum Awards	Gaylactic Spectrum Awards Foundation	Works of science fiction, fantasy and horror that explore LGBTQ (lesbian, gay, bisexual, transgender) topics in a positive way	
United States	GCLS Goldie Awards	Golden Crown Literary Society	Several categories	
United States	Judy Grahn Award	Publishing Triangle	Works of non-fiction of relevance to the lesbian community	
United States	Lambda Literary Award	Lambda Literary Foundation	Published works which celebrate or explore LGBTQ+ themes	
United States	Otherwise Award	Otherwise Award	Works of science fiction or fantasy that expand or explore one's understanding of gender	
United Kingdom	Polari Prize	Polari Salon	LGBTQ+ works by authors who were born or live in the UK or Ireland	
France	Prix République du Glamour	Glamour magazine (France)	Best French lesbian novels	
United States	Publishing Triangle Award for Trans and Gender-Variant Literature	Publishing Triangle	Works of literature on transgender themes	
India	Rainbow Awards	Dwijen Dinanath Arts Foundation	Several categories	
United States	Randy Shilts Award	Publishing Triangle	Works of non-fiction of relevance to the gay community	
United States	Robert Chesley Award	Publishing Triangle	Works by playwrights in the LGBTQ community	
Japan	Sense of Gender Awards	Japanese Association for Gender, Fantasy & Science Fiction	Science fiction or fantasy fiction which best explores and deepens the concept of Gender	
United States	Stonewall Book Award	Rainbow Round Table	Exceptional merit relating to the gay/lesbian/bisexual/transgender experience	
United States	Thom Gunn Award	Publishing Triangle	Works of gay male poetry	

== See also ==
- Lists of awards
- List of gay pornography awards
