= Christopher DiRaddo =

Canadian writer

Christopher DiRaddo (born 1974) is a Canadian writer from Montreal, Quebec. He is most noted as the 2024 recipient of the Judy Mappin Community Award from the Quebec Writers' Federation Awards, for his career contributions to the English-language literary community in the province.

A former media relations coordinator for Divers/Cité, Montreal's LGBTQ Pride festival, he published his debut novel The Geography of Pluto in 2014. His second novel, The Family Way, followed in 2021.

He was also the founder of the Violet Hour, a reading series in Montreal for LGBTQ writers, which later expanded into a regular book club to read and discuss both classic and contemporary works of LGBTQ literature. He has also been a regular participant in the city's Blue Metropolis literary festival, including creating the Blue Metropolis Violet Prize.

In 2019, he won a National Magazine Award for his enRoute piece "Austin or Bust".
