= John Blankenstein =

Dutch football referee and gay rights activist

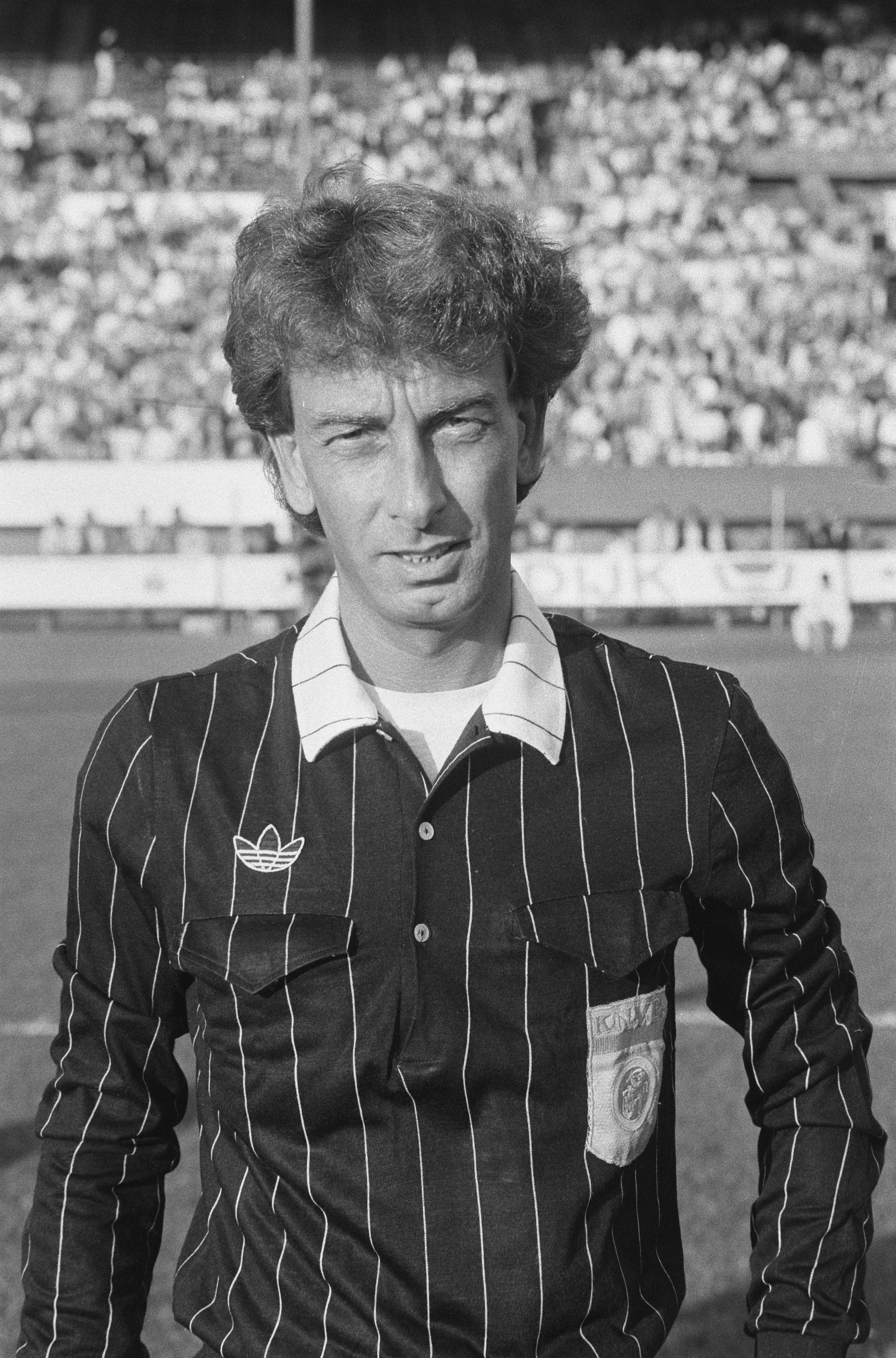
- Full name: John Blankenstein
- Born: 12 February 1949; De Bilt, Netherlands
- Died: 25 August 2006 (aged 57); The Hague, Netherlands
- Other occupation: Head of 'Referee-Affairs Professional Football' of the Royal Dutch Football Association

Domestic
Years	League	Role
1966–1979	Eerste Divisie	Referee
1979–1996	Eredivisie	Referee

International
Years	League	Role
1985–1995	FIFA listed	Referee

John Blankenstein (12 February 1949 in De Bilt – 25 August 2006 in The Hague) was a Dutch football referee and gay rights activist. He was notable for being one of the first homosexual athletes to come out in the Netherlands.

== Professional career ==
As a child, Blankenstein moved with his family to the city of The Hague, where he later played football at local club VCS.

At age 22, when he failed at developing a successful career as a professional football player, he started a career as a referee working for the Royal Dutch Football Association. From 1980 until the end of his career, he refereed 502 professional football matches. From 1985 until 1995, Blankenstein worked as a referee in 88 international matches and was on the list of referees of the International Federation of Association Football (FIFA).

Highlights of his career were the UEFA Cup final in 1993 and being chosen to referee in the 1992 European Championship.

In 1994, Blankenstein was selected to referee the 1994 UEFA Champions League Final between AC Milan and FC Barcelona, only to be replaced by Englishman Philip Don a few days before the match. The contents of the official decision were never made public, but it was said that it was because Johan Cruijff and Ronald Koeman, both FC Barcelona players, were from the Netherlands. Blankenstein himself later stated it had been because of him being openly homosexual.

After his career as a referee, Blankenstein became head of 'Referee-Affairs Professional Football' for the Royal Dutch Football Association in the city of Zeist.

== Homosexuality ==
During the 1980s and 1990s, Blankenstein became well known internationally for being one of the first openly homosexual football referees. Blankenstein was active in various anti-discrimination charities and was a celebrity in the Netherlands. For breaking with the taboo on the subject of homosexuality in football, the Dutch LGBT advocacy organization COC Nederland awarded him the Bob Angelo medal in 2003. Until June 2004, Blankenstein was chairman of COC Haaglanden, the branch of COC Nederland in the city of The Hague. During the summer of 2004, he became one of the founders of Homo LesBische Federatie Nederland. In 2005, he was awarded the Harry Stapels Award by the sports organization, NCS, for ten years of supporting the emancipation of homosexual sportsmen and -women.

On Friday, 25 August 2006, Blankenstein died in the Leyenburg Hospital in The Hague, Netherlands due to a rare kidney-related disease.

To continue his work for acceptance of and equal rights for homosexual people in sports, the John Blankenstein Foundation was founded on 18 December 2008. On 13 January 2009, the city of The Hague established an annual award for gay-emancipation and named it the John Blankenstein Award in his honor.

== Literature ==
- ISBN 1604865245 Soccer Vs. the State: Tackling Football and Radical Politics, by Gabriel Kuhn, PM Press 2011.
