= Hoshang Merchant =

Indian poet

- Born: 1947 (age 78–79); Mumbai, India
- Education: Purdue University (PhD); Occidental College (MA); St. Xavier's College, Mumbai (BA)
- Occupations: Writer, Poet
- Writing career
- Genre: Poetry
- Notable works: Flower to Flame; Selected Poems; Bellagio Blues

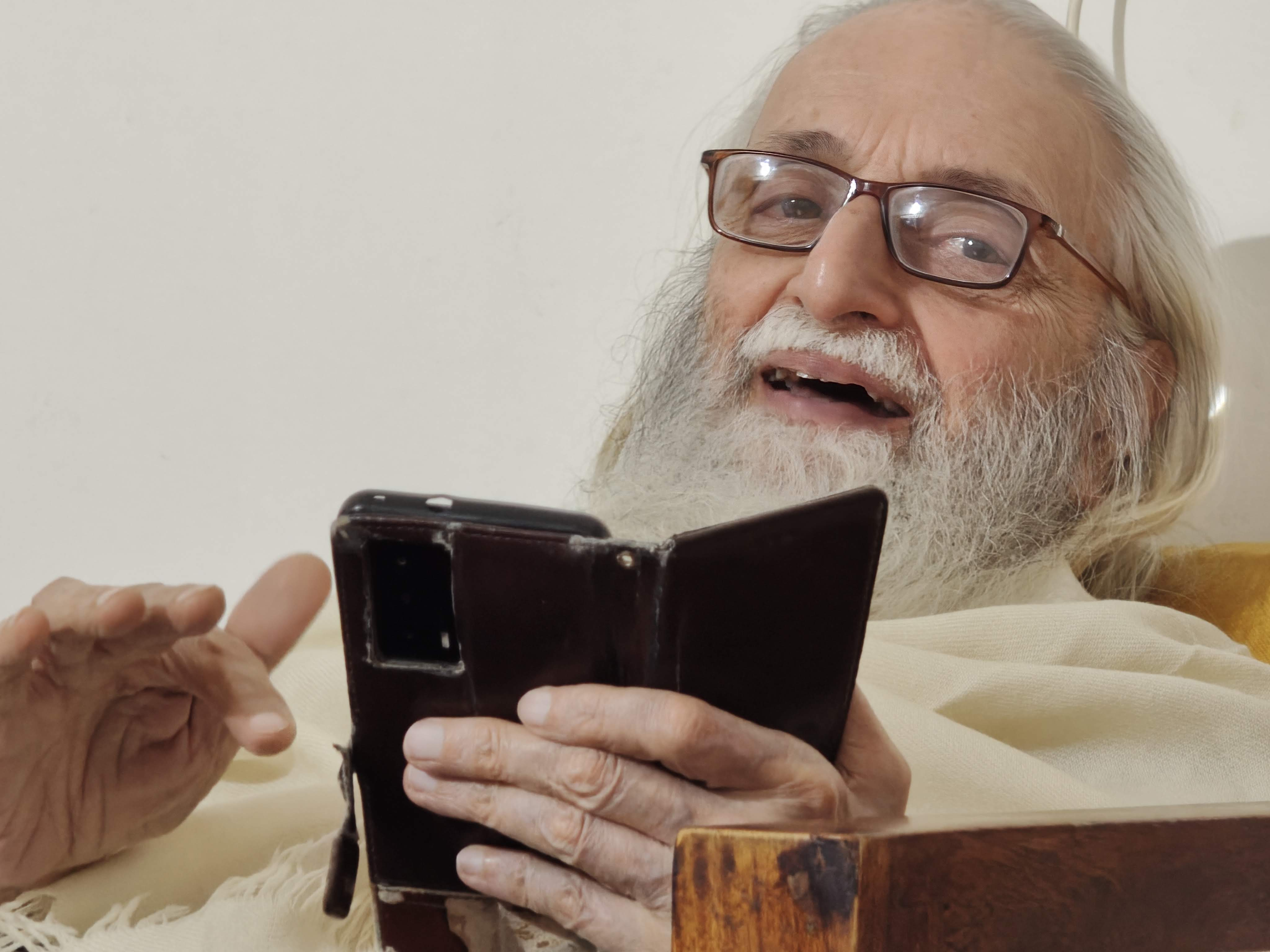
Hoshang Merchant in Bengaluru, India, February 2026.

Hoshang Dinshaw Merchant (born 1947) is an Indian poet, activist and academic. He is a preeminent voice of gay liberation in India and modern India’s first openly gay poet. Merchant is best known for his anthology on gay writing titled Yaarana.

== Early years and education ==
Merchant was born in 1947 to a working class Zoroastrian family in Mumbai, India. He was educated at Xavier's Lads Academy and St. Xavier's College, Mumbai. He has a Masters from Occidental College, Los Angeles. At Purdue, he studied Renaissance and Modernism, and for his PhD (1981), wrote a dissertation on Anaïs Nin. He has lived and taught in Heidelberg, Jerusalem and Iran where he was exposed to various radical movements of the Left. Merchant is openly gay and is as old as India' independence.

Writers Workshop in Kolkata, India has published seventeen books of his poetry since 1989. Rupa and Co. published his book of poems Flower to Flame in 1992 in the New Poetry in India series. The Rockefeller got him Bellagio Blues (2004). Yaraana: Gay Writing from India (Penguin, 1999), Forbidden Sex/Texts (Routledge, 2009), Indian Homosexuality (Allied, 2010), The Man Who Would Be Queen: Autobiographical Fiction (Penguin, 2012) and Sufiana: Poems (2013) are among his notable works.

== Teacher, poet and critic ==
Since the mid-80s, Hoshang Merchant has made his home in Hyderabad, where he taught English at University of Hyderabad.

He has written 20 books of poetry, and four critical studies. He edited India's first gay anthology Yaraana: Gay Writing from India. Secret Writings of Hoshang Merchant (OUP: New Delhi, 2016), edited by Akshaya K. Rath, is his most recent publication.

== Works ==
=== Poetry ===
- Stone to Fruit (1989, Calcutta: Writers Workshop)
- Yusuf in Memphis (1991, Calcutta: Writers Workshop)
- Hotel Golkonda: Poems 1991 (1992, Calcutta: Writers Workshop)
- Flower to Flame (1992, Delhi: Rupa & Co.)
- The Home, the Friend and the World (1995, Calcutta: Writers Workshop)
- Jonah and the Whale (1995, Calcutta: Writers Workshop)
- Love's Permission (1996, Calcutta: Writers Workshop)
- The Heart in Hiding (1996, Calcutta: Writers Workshop)
- The Birdless Cage (1997, Calcutta: Writers Workshop)
- Talking to the Djinns (1997, Calcutta: Writers Workshop)
- Selected Poems (1999, Calcutta: Writers Workshop)
- Bellagio Blues (2004, Hyderabad: Otherwise Books, Spark-India)
- Homage to Jibanananda Das (2005, Contemporary World Poetry Series, London: Aark Arts)

=== Critical studies ===
- In-discretions: Anaïs Nin (1990, Calcutta: Writers Workshop)
- Forbidden Sex, Forbidden Texts (2008, Delhi: Routledge)

=== Edited ===
- Yaarana: Gay Writing from India (1999, New Delhi: Penguin)

=== Appearances in the following poetry Anthologies ===
- Anthology of Contemporary Indian Poetry (2004) ed. by Menka Shivdasani and published by Michael Rothenberg, Big Bridge United States.
- The Penguin Book Of Indian Poets (2022) ed. by Jeet Thayil and published by Penguin Random House India.

== Accolades ==
Year	Nominated work	Award	Category	Result	Ref.
2023	N/A	Rainbow Awards	Lifetime Achievement	Won	

== See also ==
- Indian English Poetry
- Indian poetry in English
