= Jos Brink Award =

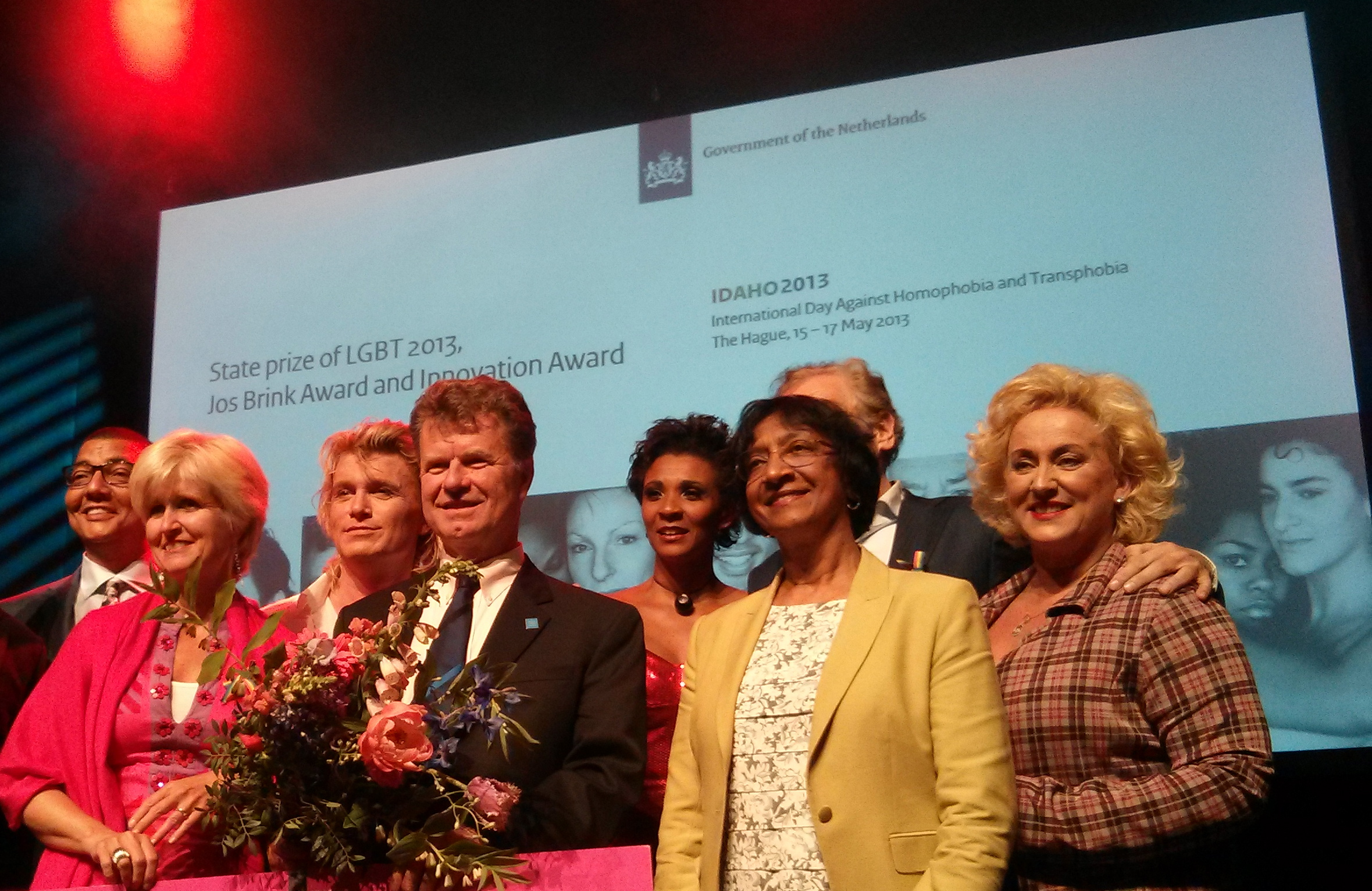
Boris Dittrich, advocacy director for the Lesbian, Gay, Bisexual, and Transgender Rights Program at Human Rights Watch, at the reception for the Jos Brink Award and Innovation Award in The Hague, The Netherlands, on May 17, 2013.

The Jos Brink Award (Jos Brink Prijs in Dutch) is a Dutch LGBT emancipation prize, founded in 2008 by the Dutch government. It is awarded every two years and named after the Dutch gay actor, cabaret artist and writer Jos Brink (1942–2007).

Since 2011, a Jos Brink Innovation Prize (Jos Brink Innovatie Prijs) is awarded besides a Jos Brink Oeuvre Prize. In 2015, only the former prize was awarded.

== General background ==
The Jos Brink Prijs was initiated by the Dutch Ministry of Education, Culture and Science, which is responsible for emancipation. It is awarded every two years to "a person or organization working on the acceptance of lesbians, homosexuals, bisexuals, transgender and intersex people".

The prize is awarded on or around May 17, the International Day Against Homophobia, Biphobia and Transphobia. The winner receives a monetary prize of EUR 10,000, and a work of art.

== Winners ==
Year	Jos Brink Oeuvre Prize	Jos Brink Innovation Prize	Other
2009	Henk Krol, founder and editor in chief of the Gay Krant		Encouragement prize: rcth (Rotterdams Centrum voor Theater)
2011	COC	Ahmed Marcouch	
2013	Boris Dittrich	Döne Fil	
2015		Gelijk = Gelijk	
2017	Ellie Lust	BeyonG Veldkamp	
2019	Joke Swiebel	Bowi Jong	
2021	Glenn Helberg	Naomie Pieter	
