= Santa Khurai =

Indian activist

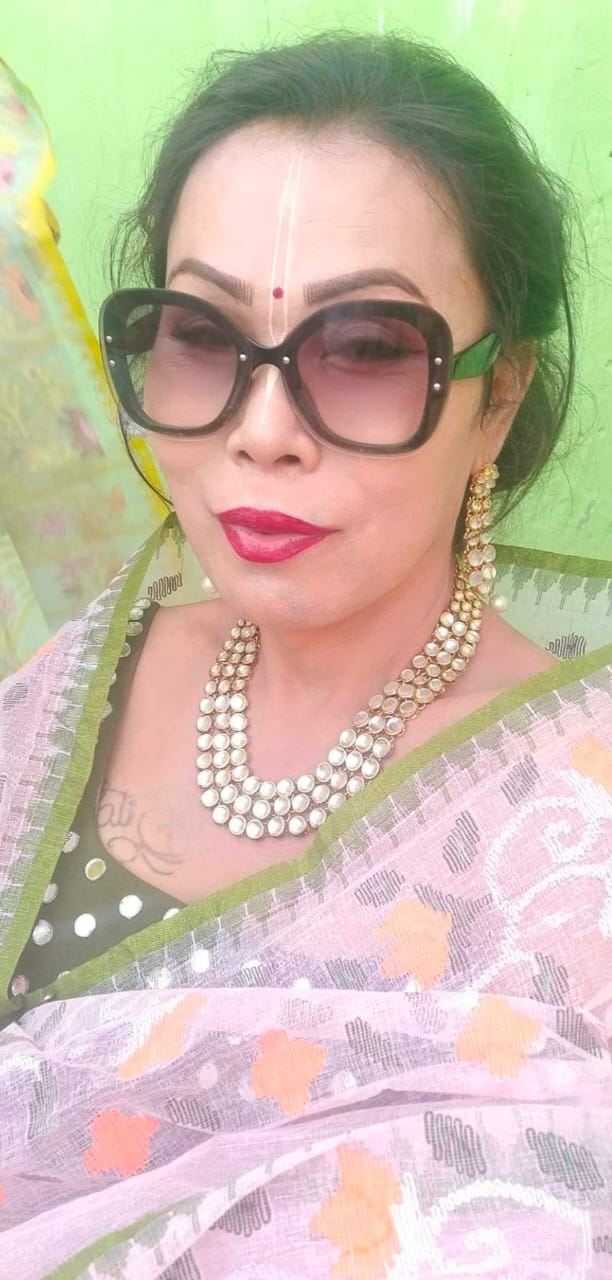
- Born: Manipur, India
- Occupations: Artist, writer, activist
- Organizations: All Manipur Nupi Maanbi Association (AMANA)
- Known for: Transgender rights activism, writing, filmmaking
- Notable work: The Yellow Sparrow, Men Shaman of Manipur – Nupa Amaibi, Nawa – The Spirit of Atey
- Style: Documentary, activist art
- Movement: Trans rights, indigenous feminism, Meitei cultural revival

Santa Khurai is a Meitei: Nupi Maanbi (transgender woman) gender-rights activist, writer, and artist from Manipur, India. She is a member of the Indigenous community of Manipur, the Meitei people. She is the secretary of the All Manipur Nupi Maanbi Association (AMANA).

She filed a public interest litigation (PIL) in the Supreme Court of India, challenging the constitutional validity of Clauses 12 and 51 of the Guidelines on Blood Donor Selection and Blood Donor Referral, 2017, issued by the National Transfusion Council and the National AIDS Control Organization under the Ministry of Health and Family Welfare.

Khurai has also presented a statement at the 48th session of the United Nations Human Rights Council, held in September 2021 in Geneva. The statement was made on behalf of lesbian, gay, bisexual, transgender and intersex persons from 14 countries from the Global East and the Global South.

Khurai has led trainings of trainers on international human rights law. She has also created films Men Shaman of Manipur - Nupa Amaibi supported by Heinrich-Böll-Stiftung, released in 2021 and Nawa – The Spirit of Atey, which won the best film award in the non-fiction film competition section at the Nagaland Film Festival 2019.

Santa Khurai was invited by the University of California, Berkeley to give a book talk on The Yellow Sparrow: Memoir of a Transgender on 12 March 2025.

== Activism ==
=== Public Interest Litigation: Constitutionality of Blood Donation Guidelines ===
Santa Khurai filed a Public Interest Litigation (PIL) Thangjam Santa Singh @ Santa Khurai vs Union of India & Ors. in the Supreme Court of India in March 2021. The PIL challenges Clauses 12 and 51 of the Guidelines on Blood Donor Selection and Blood Donor Referral issued by the National Blood Transfusion Council (NBTC) and the National AIDS Control Organisation (NACO) in 2017. These clauses permanently banned transgender persons, men who have sex with men, and female sex workers from donating blood. The guidelines considered this group of persons as "at risk" for HIV, Hepatitis B and Hepatitis C infections. Khurai pointed out that the effect of these guidelines was felt the most during the pandemic, when transgender persons were unable to donate blood to other members of their community during emergencies.

Khurai sought to strike down Clauses 12 and 51 of the Guidelines as unconstitutional and in violation of Articles 14, 15 and 21 of the Constitution of India, 1950. She argued that the grounds for the permanent ban were arbitrary, discriminatory and unscientific. Imposition of a life-long ban on certain marginalized sections, instead of a three-month or 45-day deferral from the last high-risk sexual contact, or just screening their blood as per the usual norms — ends up in stigmatizing the said communities as they are not based on how HIV-transmission actually works, nor are they based on the actual risks involved in specific activities and lets the individuals who may still engage in high-risk behavior donate.

The permanent ban violates Article 14 and 15, which ensure Equality of All Persons and prohibit discrimination as it:

a) Deprives transgender persons, gay and bisexual men, and female sex workers of the right to donate blood and considers them ‘at risk’ is based on gender identity and sexual orientation

b)There is no correlation between the goal to make blood donation safe, and the exclusion of said group of persons, and

c) Basis for exclusion is negative stereotypes in society against this group of persons.

The Supreme Court has issued notice to the Respondents and the case is currently pending.

Hearing Santa Khurai's petition, the Supreme Court of India asked, 'Are We Going To Brand Them All Risky?' as reported by Live Laws.14 May 2025.

=== The All Manipur Nupi Maanbi Association (AMANA) ===
In 2010, Khurai was invited to be part of a Universal Periodic Review (UPR) working session, a UN human rights initiative, in Delhi. Upon her return to Manipur, she became the Secretary of the All Manipur Nupi Maanbi Association (AMANA), a coalition working towards raising awareness of trans rights in Manipur.

Soon after Khurai joined, AMANA organised the Trans Queen Contest North East, to use fashion and beauty to bring the trans community forward and help expand the AMANA network in the region.

AMANA also organised the distribution of phaneks worn by mothers, which were collected by allies for trans women as a symbol of encouragement and acceptance.

Along with Solidarity and Action Against HIV Infection in India (SAATHII), AMANA co-implemented a short-term research-based project titled "Pheida - Gender at the Periphery" that sought to study elements in the history of gender inclusivity in Manipuri society.

As an Indigenous Manipuri Nupi Maanbi, Khurai has objected to the use of the term "Bahujan" in describing a Nupi Maanbi ('transgender women' in English), highlighting how indigenous people understand their world and how different it is from Indian mainland narratives that attempt to assimilate them. She has spoken about how the caste system comprising identities such as Savarna, Vaishya and Shudra, is detached from Meitei realities.

=== Manipur's First Transgender Women's Grievance Cell ===
Under the aegis of the Manipur State Commission for Women, Khurai played an instrumental role in setting up Manipur's first Transgender Women's Grievance Cell, which works to eradicate structural and institutionalised discrimination against trans women and help them access and navigate the judicial and law enforcement systems in Manipur. Cases reported to the Cell are directed to the State Women's Commission, who can then escalate them to the Social Welfare Department or a relevant body for intervention. Santa Khurai heads the Cell, along with Bonita Pebam, Roro Khumanthem, and Zen Pui.

=== Other Advocacy Efforts ===
Growing up in a home with no support from her parents, Khurai set up the first beauty salon run by a trans person in Manipur in the 1990s in order to support herself. The salon's success inspired others in the trans community to open their own salons and provide livelihood opportunities for others. In the 90s, she also led a Nupi Maanbi dance team called the "Seven Sisters".

Khurai has been working on gender and sexual minorities rights issues for the last twenty years. She is also associated with Solidarity and Action Against HIV Infection in India (SAATHII), and was a fellow at the Asia Pacific Trans Network (APTN) and RFSL Sweden.

At the 48th Human Rights Council Session held in Geneva in September 2021, Khurai presented a statement to the Special Rapporteur on Water and Sanitation on behalf of LGBTI persons from 14 countries from the Global East and Global South. Her statement highlighted issues faced by the LGBTIQ+ community related to democratic access to safe water and sanitation, including violations of rights to safe water and sanitation, due to a range of harmful norms and stereotypes. She also highlighted the adverse effects of water privatization and climate change, water crises and contamination, and how these disproportionately impact indigenous trans persons. Her statement sought the Special Rapporteur to engage and consult with LGBTI persons from underrepresented regions on these issues.

Khurai also advocated for separate toilets for transgender persons during the Sangai Film Festival. The State Tourism Department accepted the proposal to provide such toilets in order to alleviate the difficulties that the community faces in addressing public toilets. This was the first time that separate toilets for trans persons were assured during a festival in the region.

Khurai has also helped many trans persons in Manipur get their gender identity legally updated through the necessary documentation, enabling them to obtain passports with trans identification.

=== Covid-19 efforts ===
She filed a PIL seeking inclusion of the trans community into the COVID-19 relief scheme that aimed to uplift lives of residents during the pandemic. The Manipur High Court (HC) directed the state government to include transgender communities within the COVID-19 Affected Livelihood Support Scheme, after her PIL.

They also set up dedicated quarantine centres for stranded members of the transgender community who are returning to the state amid a nationwide lockdown. Two separate quarantine spaces, including a dedicated centre for the trans community, were set up in Imphal. This happened only after Khurai's PIL and is possibly a first of such steps taken for the trans community there.

Khurai's other efforts for COVID include organising a crowdfunding campaign for children to raise funds for gadgets to help them study online during the pandemic.

=== Supreme Court Intervention and Arrest Stay ===
Santa Khurai has initiated legal proceedings by filing a petition with the Supreme Court against the State of Manipur. The petition pertained to a case filed against her for a social media post in which she raised concerns about the alleged mishandling of transgender welfare funds by the Manipur State Welfare Department. The Supreme Court intervened on her behalf, issuing a stay on her potential arrest and stipulating her full cooperation with the ongoing investigation. This development holds a significant moment in her activism and the broader context of transgender rights in India.

== Media and Publications ==
=== Writings ===
Khurai is the author of several articles documenting the experiences of Manipur's Nupa Amaibi and their tradition. She is also one of the authors of Pheida – Gender at Periphery, highlighting the history of gender diversity and inclusivity in the Manipuri society. The book was released by traditional scholar Chanam Hemchandra Khaba in November 2020.

Khurai is a poet, contributing two poems, "My Father" and "Nupi Maanbi Thabal" to the queer anthology, The World That Belongs to Us, presenting heterogeneous and plural South Asian voices talking about the world and their experiences of queerness.

In November 2022, Khurai published a book titled Gaining Full Citizenship of Manipuri Indigenous Nupi Maanbi and Nupa Maanba, which explores how the transgender law and policy shape the lives of Nupi Maanbi and Nupa Maanba (transgender women and transgender men) indigenous to Manipur, their identity and community.

Khurai has also contributed to the book COVID-19 Assemblages: Queer and Feminist Ethnographies from South Asia (2022), published by Routledge India, with a poem titled "Looming".

In 2023, Speaking Tiger Books published The Yellow Sparrow by Santa Khurai.

Santa Khurai has published numerous articles exploring the experiences of transgender people in various domains, such as the education of transgender children, dispelling misconceptions around blood donation(collaboration) and promoting menstrual hygiene among transgender men.

Khurai is a significant contributor to the zine titled Covid Chronicles from Manipur: Hope and Despair, published on June 2, 2023, documenting the hardships experienced by the local transgender community during the COVID-19 pandemic and highlighting the support initiated by AMANA to ensure their survival.

Additionally, Santa Khurai’s insights have been featured in an interview published by the Orfalea Center for Global and International Studies, University of California, Santa Barbara.

The Yellow Sparrow has been shortlisted for the Rainbow Award 2024 by Rainbow Lit Fest, South Asia's largest queer and inclusive literary festival. It was also earlier shortlisted for the Ramnath Goenka Sahithya Samman in the non-fiction category along with Neerja Chowdhury's How Prime Ministers Decide, The Day I Became A Runner by Sohini Chattopadhyay, and H-Pop: The Secretive World of Hindutva Pop Stars by Kunal Purohit.

=== Films and Podcasts ===
Khurai and Amar Maibam made a documentary film titled Nawa – The Spirit of Atey that won the best film award in the non-fiction film competition section at the Nagaland Film Festival 2019. The film traces the realities of Atey, a transgender boy belonging to the Meitei community, explores his home-life and adolescent conversations, the challenges and support he receives towards his gender preference and expression. The film also talks about how the communities negotiate with their own biases to give a better life to their trans children.

In 2022, Khurai produced a podcast titled The Forbidden Prophecies: Life account of Manipuri indigenous transgender Shamans and a film titled Men Shaman of Manipur - Nupa Amaibi supported by Heinrich-Böll-Stiftung, exploring the life stories of Nupa Amaibis. Amaibi is a shaman-like indigenous community in Manipur. Within Amaibi, there are men, women, and transgender shamans. However, the Nupa Amaibis, the transgender shamans, are completely invisibilized in the shaman community, facing constant rejection and denial from all parts of society in Manipur. With only limited literature and works referencing their historical identity, Khurai's film and podcast are an effort towards amplifying the narratives of Nupa Amaibis and resisting the erasure of their existence from the consciousness of society.

Santa Khurai has been featured in numerous podcasts. An episode on the Indian Organising Podcast, Trans Right Activism with Santa Khurai where she engages in a comprehensive discussion about how trans rights intersect with critical issues like citizenship, documentation, access to resources, public health, water and sanitation. This illuminating conversation is hosted by Abhishek Desai and Anannya Parekh, with a production led by Suchanda Banerjee spanning two episodes. Additionally, in the podcast series Queering Perspective, one episode delves into the Trans community in Manipur, India. In this episode, Khurai not only explores the unique challenges faced by the trans community in Manipur but also delves into their distinctive experiences in comparison to the rest of India. Furthermore, it delves into the marginalisation of the Amaibi community, traditionally regarded as the spiritual leaders of the queer community in the region.
