= Thomas Trautmann =

American historian and cultural anthropologist

Thomas R. Trautmann
- Born: May 27, 1940; Madison, Wisconsin
- Occupations: Scholar of ancient Indology, professor
- Known for: Editor of Comparative Studies in Society and History
- Spouse: Marcella Hauolilani Choy (m. 1967)
- Children: 2
- Parent(s): Milton and Esther Florence (Trachte) Trautmann

Academic background
- Education: Beloit College (B.A.); University of London (PhD)
- Thesis: Kautilya and the Arthasastra: a Statistical Investigation of the Authorship and Evolution of the Text (1968)

Academic work
- Discipline: Anthropology, history
- Institutions: University of Michigan

Thomas Roger Trautmann is an American historian, cultural anthropologist, and Professor Emeritus of History and Anthropology at the University of Michigan. He is considered a leading expert on the Arthashastra, the ancient Hindu text on statecraft, economic policy, and military strategy, written in Sanskrit. Trautmann has mentored many students during his tenure at the University of Michigan. His studies focus on ancient India, the history of anthropology, and other related subjects. Trautmann's work in Indology has been credited with illuminating the underlying economic philosophy that governed ancient Indian kinship. He has also written book-length studies on both Dravidian and American Indian kinship. His most recent study concerns the use of the elephant in ancient India.

Trautmann began as an assistant professor in 1968, teaching his entire career at Ann Arbor until he was awarded emeritus status. He has served as director of the University of Michigan History Department, as well as head of the Center for South Asian Studies. From 1997 to 2006, he served as the editor of Comparative Studies in Society and History. He was honored with a festschrift in 2011. Born and raised in Madison, Wisconsin, he completed his undergraduate work at Beloit College and holds a PhD from the University of London, where he wrote his dissertation on the structure and composition of the Sanskrit text Arthasastra (published in book form in 1971).

== Works ==
- Bryer, Anthony; Gough, Michael; Trautmann, Thomas R.; Young, L. K. (1969). Byzantium and the ancient east. Paul Hamlyn. ISBN 978-0-600-13943-0.
- Trautmann, Thomas R. (1971). Kautilya and the Arthasastra: a statistical investigation of the authorship and evolution of the text. Leiden: BRILL. OCLC 576363603.
- Trautmann, Thomas R. (1974). Kinship and History in South Asia. Ann Arbor: Center for South and Southeastern Asian Studies, University of Michigan. ISBN 978-0-88386-417-3.
- Trautmann, Thomas R. (1981). Dravidian Kinship. Cambridge: Cambridge University Press. ISBN 978-0-521-23703-1.
- Trautmann, Thomas R. (1987). Lewis Henry Morgan and the Invention of Kinship. Berkeley: University of California Press. ISBN 978-0-520-06457-7.
- Trautmann, Thomas R. (2008). Lewis Henry Morgan and the invention of kinship: with a new introduction and appendices by the author. Lincoln: University of Nebraska Press. ISBN 978-0-8032-6006-1.
- Trautmann, Thomas R. (1992). "The revolution in ethnological time". Man: A Monthly Record of Anthropological Science (379). OCLC 715283212.
- Trautmann, Thomas R.; Kabelac, Karl Sanford (1994). "The Library of Lewis Henry Morgan and Mary Elizabeth Morgan". Transactions of the American Philosophical Society. 84 (6–7). Philadelphia: The American Philosophical Society: i. doi:10.2307/1006604. ISBN 978-0-87169-846-9. JSTOR 1006604.
- Hughes, Diane Owen; Trautmann, Thomas R., eds. (1996). Time: histories and ethnologies. Ann Arbor: University of Michigan Press. ISBN 978-0-472-06579-0.
- Trautmann, Thomas R. (1997). Aryans and British India. Berkeley: University of California Press. ISBN 978-0-585-10445-4.
- Godelier, Maurice; Trautmann, Thomas R.; Fat, Franklin Edmunc Tjon Sie, eds. (1998). Transformation of Kinship. Washington: Smithsonian Institution Press. ISBN 978-1-56098-768-0.
- Trautmann, Thomas R. (1999). "Hullabaloo about Telugu". South Asia Research. 19 (1). New Delhi: Sage Publications India: 53–70. doi:10.1177/026272809901900104. OCLC 500250081. S2CID 144334963.
- Trautmann, Thomas R. (2002). Languages and Nations: Conversations in Colonial South India. Berkeley: University of California Press. ISBN 978-0-520-93190-9.
- Trautmann, Thomas R. (2005). The Aryan Debate. New Delhi: Oxford University Press. ISBN 978-0-19-569200-6.
- Trautmann, Thomas R. (2006). Languages and nations: the Dravidian proof in colonial Madras. Berkeley: University of California Press. ISBN 978-0-520-24455-9.
- Trautmann, Thomas R.; Cuntaram, Irāma (2007). Tirāviṭac cāṉṟu: Ellīsūm tirāviṭa moḻikaḷum (in Tamil). Cennai: காலச்சுவடு பதிப்பகம். ISBN 978-81-89359-51-5.
- Trautmann, Thomas R. (2009). The Madras school of Orientalism: producing knowledge in colonial South India. New Delhi: Oxford University Press. ISBN 978-0-19-806314-8.
- Trautmann, Thomas R. (2009). The clash of chronologies: ancient India in the modern world. New Delhi: Yoda Press. ISBN 978-81-906186-5-6.
- Trautmann, Thomas R.; Cogswell, Jim; Paymal, Elisabeth (2011). India: brief history of a civilization. New York: Oxford University Press. ISBN 978-0-19-973632-4.
- Trautmann, Thomas R.; Talbot, Cynthia, eds. (2011). Knowing India: colonial and modern constructions of the past: essays in honour of Thomas R. Trautmann. New Delhi: Yoda Press. ISBN 978-93-8040-303-8.
- Trautmann, Thomas R.; Whiteley, Peter M. (2012). Crow-Omaha: new light on a classic problem of kinship analysis. Tucson: University of Arizona Press. ISBN 978-0-8165-0790-0.
- Trautmann, Thomas R. (2015). Elephants and Kings: An Environmental History. Chicago: University of Chicago Press. ISBN 978-0-2262-6422-6.
