= Jehoshua Rozenman =

Dutch-Israeli sculptor (born 1955)

Jehoshua Rozenman (Hebrew: יהושע רוזנמן; born June 21, 1955) is a Dutch-Israeli sculptor.

A native of Tel Aviv, Israel, Rozenman moved to the Netherlands in 1979 when he was accepted as a student to the Rijksacademie voor Beeldende Kunsten (National Academy of Arts) in Amsterdam. He graduated in 1984, and became a Dutch citizen and then stayed in the Netherlands. Rozenman worked for six years in New York and Amsterdam beginning in 2007. Rozenman relocated to Berlin, Germany in 2013. Rozenman divides his time living and travelling between Germany and the Netherlands. In 2006, he married the Dutch Democrats 66 politician and human rights activist Boris Dittrich.

== Description of his sculptures ==
Working with glass as a material fascinates Rozenman. Glass is fragile and vulnerable, but at the same time it is everlasting. Glass can be clear or non-translucent like ceramic, and fragile, or to the contrary, hard and unbreakable. Rozenman's method of working with glass resembles that of a smith, the way he melts a lump of glass in his oven, and then works the glass into abstract shapes. Rozenman's sculptures remind patrons of small architectonic structures, residues of an industrial building in decay; motors and machines rusted through the passing of endless time, or prehistoric creatures fossilized in a piece of amber; the remains of a world that ceased to exist thousands of years ago. The sculptures make a robust impression, threatening, but at the same time they are ambivalent, because decay, and the object's transitory nature are themes that are recurring in his work. Rozenman's sculptures are objects whose essences existed in the past, but seem that they have no present function. What remains is purity and beauty in an unconventional way.

== Solo exhibitions in museums ==
Rozenman started his career as a painter. In the late nineties he worked with video and in 2005 he began as a sculptor using glass as material, melting it in an oven. Rozenman was successful throughout his career. He exhibited with solo shows in several museums in the world.

- His sculpture exhibition ‘Cast images’ (made from perishable material) was shown in 1997 in the Stedelijk Museum in Amsterdam.
- His project ‘Under Cover’ was exhibited in the Museum of Textiles in Barcelona, Spain in 1998.
- Cast Images was shown in the Provincial Museum of Modern Art in Hasselt, Belgium in 1998.
- His project ‘Moving pictures’ was exhibited in the Museum of Modern Art in Groningen, the Netherlands in 2000.
- In 2002 his project "Behind the wall of scents" was exhibited in the Teffen Museum in Israel and in 2003 in the Israel Museum in Jerusalem.
- His project ‘Under Cover’ was exhibited in the Van der Togt Museum in Amstelveen, the Netherlands in 2005. The same museum showed his sculptures in 2009.
- In 2011/2012 his sculptures were shown in an exhibition called ‘Rusted Glass’ in the Museum Beelden aan Zee (Sculptures at the Sea) in Scheveningen/the Hague, the Netherlands.
- In 2013 his work was part of the International Sculpture Exhibition Art Zuid, in Amsterdam and of the exhibition "the outside within" at the Estate Anningahof near Zwolle, the Netherlands.

== Exhibitions in galleries ==
In the course of the years Rozenman had many exhibitions in galleries. His work has been shown in galleries in Amsterdam, Hoofddorp, the Hague, Utrecht, Leiden, Dordrecht, Groningen, Haarlem, Antwerp, Oostende, Tel Aviv, Jerusalem, Munich and New York.

== Art films and documentaries ==
Rozenman made several art films and a documentary.

- His film ‘The art of leaving me’ was shown at the film festival Gorcum and was part of Docs for Sale International Documentary Festival Amsterdam (IDFA) in 2001.
- His film ‘Raphael’ was co-produced with Anat Pick. Both artists gave a live performance with video in Jerusalem, Israel in 2001.
- The short film ‘Moving Pictures’ was shown in the Turin G&L Film Festival 2002, Milano G&L Film festival 2002, Flemish Theater Festival in Amsterdam and the Film Festival in Gorcum, 2000.
- His documentary ‘Late Wedding’ premiered at the Film Festival; in New York City and was shown during festivals in The Netherlands, New Zealand, Australia, Canada, Colombia in 2004 and 2005 and was broadcast on television in Canada and repeatedly in the Netherlands in 2005.

Books:

- The following projects Cast Images (Zinnen-Beelden) (1997), Under Cover (1998), Behind the wall of scents (2003) and Rusted Glass (Roestig glas) (2011) were accompanied by books.
