= John Blankenstein Award =

Dutch annual gay emancipation award

The John Blankenstein Award is the annual gay-emancipation award in The Hague, Netherlands. It highlights the significance of gay men and lesbian women participating and positioning themselves equally in society. The award comprises an art-object designed by local artist Liesbeth Busman (1977) – and a financial grant.

== History ==
On 12 June 2008, the Municipal Council of The Hague granted a motion to annually present a ‘gay emancipation award’. The motion was an initiative of a representative of the Socialist Party, Tymen Colijn. It would signify the intention of The Hague to profile itself as a gay-friendly city and therefore, this annual gay emancipation award was created. Among others, the Municipal Council believed issuing an emancipation-award could positively raise consciousness and understanding of homosexuality, as well as its own open position on gay emancipation and equality. Furthermore, it also hoped that this award would generate positive interest and attention to gay-related activities. Therefore, on 13 January 2009, the council of the Mayor and Municipal Executives of the city of The Hague passed a bill creating this unique award and named it after a famous Dutch citizen and sports figure - John Blankenstein.

== John Blankenstein ==
The gay emancipation award is named after former soccer-referee John Blankenstein (1949-2006). In the late 1980s, Blankenstein gained national and international fame by being the first professional referee to come out openly for being homosexual. Consequently, he worked fervently to raise awareness about being gay in sports. For standing up against prejudice towards the gay community, and for bringing the topic of homosexuality more out into the open, the Dutch gay association COC Nederland presented him with the ‘Bob Angelo Medal’. He was Chairman and board member of the Hague' regional chapter COC Haaglanden until he died in 2006.

== Art-object by Liesbeth Busman ==
The symbolism of the hand-crafted object which is part of the John Blankenstein Award is described by goldsmith and artist Liesbeth Busman as follows: "The John Blankenstein Award is an object in which the triangular volumes depict various stages of development and growth. The triangle is an archetypal, universal symbol for the female - and the male principle. By connecting the individual triangles together – manwomanwomanmanmanwoman etc. - they are a forming a developed community to which meaning is given by man, regardless of his or her sexual orientation, shape or color. Each triangular shaped volume is different: individual volumes unfold within the object and expose more and more of the pink inner. The interior of the volume is gold plated with pink 'Traum Gold'. The color pink has a signal function. Literally as John Blankenstein as a referee gave signals with his referee whistle, but also figuratively because of its signal position within the gay rights movement. Behind the object the shadows, through the plexiglas, provide a changing, free view of the object. The gay rights movement is in motion. At the lower triangular part the shape has been completely unfolded. The pink inner has been released. This part can also be worn as a brooch. Thus, the Gay rights movement is further propagated."

== Jury and Organization ==
The persons and institutions involved in deciding the winner and presenting the award are: a predetermined jury of well known gay, lesbian and straight people, COC Haaglanden and the city of The Hague. COC Haaglanden is the host and organizes and executes the processes and procedures associated with this award.

== Nominations ==
To be nominated for the John Blankenstein Award, a candidate should contribute to a positive perception with regard to gay emancipation in the city of The Hague. The winner must be prepared to fill a position of ‘gay ambassador’ or be a gay role model. All successful initiatives may compete for the award, whether they be individuals, groups or institutions. The financial grant is bestowed as a subsidy that should be spent on advancement of gay emancipation. Candidates can be nominated by the general public, organizations or by themselves. Municipal establishments, executing bodies, staff and members of the jury involved may not participate in the competition. A candidate should live in The Hague or surroundings and should have a clear connection with the city. Any winner shall not receive such an award for 5 subsequent years, nor is an award presented to deceased persons. These rules where set in the bill passed by the council of the Mayor and Municipal Executives of the city of The Hague on 13 January 2009.

== Recent Award Winners ==
- 20 June 2009 - During “Pink Saturday”, Municipal Executive Bert van Alphen presented the First Edition of the award to Fred Kleian (1945-2011) – co-founder of Rainbow Foundation – for raising awareness and promoting understanding about homosexuality among members of various ethnic minorities in The Hague.
- 12 June 2010 - Local broadcasting corporation ‘Omroep West’ was the second entity to win the award. According to the jury, their unique approach to boost positive perception of homosexuality was the key to winning the award.
- 3 September 2011 - At The Hague Pride – a gay related festival – the award was presented by Municipal Executive Karsten Klein to ‘Roze In Blauw’ (Pink In Blue), a local branch of the National Police Gay Network. Among other initiatives, they contributed significantly to promoting sexual diversity among the Police Force.
- 11 October 2012 - Anita Chedi Shiwally, an advocate for sexual diversity in schools and other venues won the award in 2012. She, as an individual, is a major force that works to raise understanding for lesbians, gays, bisexuals and transgender people in society.
- 2 November 2013 - The recipient of 2013 was 'ADO Den Haag in de Maatschappij', an initiative of football club ADO Den Haag which is committed to fight taboos within sports, allowing gay people to feel free to come out for their homosexuality. They accepted their award during the LGBTQ festival 'WHAT' (We Are The Hague).

This award shall continue to be given out each year to an individual or organization that promotes sexual diversity and understanding in both The Hague mainstream society and the local LGBT community.
