= Yoda Press =

Indian publishing house

- Founded: 2004; 22 years ago
- Founders: Arpita Das, Parul Nayyar
- Headquarters location: Shahpur Jat, Siri Fort, New Delhi
- Owner: Arpita Das
- Official website: YodaPress.co.in

Yoda Press is a publishing house in India, with its headquarters located at Shahpur Jat, Siri Fort, New Delhi. It was founded by Arpita Das and Parul Nayyar in 2004.

== History ==
Yoda Press was founded by Arpita Das and Parul Nayyar in 2004. They wanted to publish non-mainstream, alternative works that were disregarded by larger publishing houses. Das felt she was filled with ideas, limited by her trade publishing job, and saw that the world was changing, which helped her decide that the time was right for starting an indie press. She had also seen other women found independent publishers when the topics they were interested in were not supported by mainstream publishers.

Das and Nayyar aimed to continually popularize lists for new niche genres, then change focus when larger publishers noticed the trend. They hoped to produce overlooked crossover titles between academic and mass-market writing. Another of their early priorities was creating the first South Asian list solely focused on LGBTQIA+ writing. Das wished she could publish writers like Alan Hollinghurst and Jeanette Winterson, but she had not been supported in publishing queer narrative non-fiction writing at her previous company. Speaking with activist writers like Gautam Bhan, Arvind Narrain, Maya Sharma, and Pramada Menon helped Das decide on what form the press's queer literature would take.

Das named the press after Yoda, a character she admired for being wise and childlike. Das's friend Oroon Das, a graphic designer, created Yoda Press's logo. It blended elephants and punctuation marks, two of the founder's loves. Nayyar's grandmother had a flat in Connaught Place which the press used as an office for its first two years. In 2005, they published their first book, Boria Majumdar's Once Upon a Furore, which discussed overlooked parts of cricket's history. They later hired their first assistant editor, Supriya Nayak. After the publisher's fourth anniversary, Nayyar left the press.

=== Yodakin ===
Das decided to open a bookstore focused on independent publishers like Yoda Press, and opened Yodakin in Hauz Khas village. Her daughter had an accident just before the store opened, requiring months of recovery, and the neighborhood and Yoda Press's authors supported the family and the bookstore. Yodakin eventually helped Yoda Press sell more books, but it shut down in 2012 due to rising rents. Das stated that May Day Bookstore & Café and U Choice had filled similar roles, and with Yodakin's closure, May Day became one of the main bookstore promoters of indie titles.

=== Imprints ===
In 2015 the Press signed up for a joint academic imprint with Sage Publishing India. Later, Yoda Press established another joint imprint with Simon & Schuster India for trade books with the Press's characteristic political edge. The first title on this joint imprint, Azadi: A Graphic Biography of Bhagat Singh (in reference to Shaheed Bhagat Singh, the famous revolutionary martyr of India) will be published in April 2020.

=== Expansion ===
Yoda Press was awarded the Publisher of the Year Prize in 2016 at the Publishing Next Conference, held annually in Goa, India. During 2016, the press also began publishing books on mental health, after noticing that many of the most popular titles read by Indian students originated in the U.S., which Das took as a sign of a market gap. The press also began publishing works of fiction in 2016. Online sales formed a large part of Yoda's revenue by 2020.

During the pandemic, their revenue dropped, and they created a manuscript review service for authors as another revenue stream. Around 2024, longtime employee Ishita Gupta became Das's partner in running the press.

== LGBTQ influence ==
Five Yoda Press titles were cited by courts leading to the judgement in 2018 that decriminalised homosexuality in India. Das said that it was "seriously radical" to publish two of the books cited by the Supreme Court of India, and she was very proud to have published them. The works were Because I Have A Voice: Queer Politics in India, edited by Arvind Narrain and Gautam Bhan and Loving Women: Being Lesbian in Unprivileged India, authored by Maya Sharma. She has credited many of the authors and works associated with Yoda Press as having an influence on LGBTQ activist movements and court rulings that established rights for the LGBTQ community in India.

At least two Yoda Press works have been shortlisted for Rainbow Awards, with Maya Sharma's Footprints of a Queer History winning the 2023 Rainbow Award for Nonfiction.

== Notable publications ==
Notable publications of Yoda Press:

#	First Published	Title	Author (s)	Notes	Related references
1	2005	Because I Have a Voice: Queer Politics in India	Arvind Narrain		
2	2019	Between Memory and Forgetting: Massacre and the Modi Years in Gujarat.	Harsh Mander	Political Commentary	
3	2016	Refractions of Islam in India: Situating Sufism and Yoga	Carl W. Ernst		
4	2018	Purgatory in Kashmir: Violation of Juvenile Justice in the Indian Jammu and Kashmir	Mohsin Alam Bhat & Suroor Mander		
5	2004	Aryans and British India	Thomas R. Trautmann		
6	2019	Him, Me, Muhammad Ali	Randa Jarrar		
7	2022	Footprints of a Queer History: Life Stories from Gujarat	Maya Sharma	Won a 2023 Rainbow Award	
