= Footprints of a Queer History =

2022 nonfiction book by Maya Sharma

Footprints of a Queer History: Life Stories from Gujarat
- Author: Maya Sharma
- Language: English
- Subject: History, LGBTQ topics
- Published: 2022
- Publisher: Yoda Press
- Publication place: New Delhi, India
- Pages: 359
- ISBN: 978-9-382-57935-9

Footprints of a Queer History: Life Stories from Gujarat is a 2022 non-fiction book by Maya Sharma, published by Yoda Press. It shares the experiences of trans men and lesbian women living in Gujarat and some of the politics and history affecting queer people there. The book won the 2023 Rainbow Award for Nonfiction.

== Contents ==
Footprints of a Queer History: Life Stories from Gujarat centers on the experiences of queer people, those who identified with shifting or marginal gender and sexual identities, and especially those who defied the bounds of the communities they lived in. It also tells the history of Vikalp and its evolution to serve more people, and discusses the policies and cultures that affected the opportunities available to queer people in Gujarat. The book additionally biographies Sharma's own life and history of activism with Vikalp.

The book's preface provides background to how stories were gathered and Sharma's own relationship to the sources and issues used in the book. She explains that her definition of queer follows that of Arvind Narrain, saying more than describing LGBT people, it is "about loosening up the rigid structures of caste, gender and compulsory sexuality". Sharma also discusses how her understanding of LGBTQ issues and identities has shifted over time, alongside Vikalp's understanding and relation to the community. She explains that her language and terminology will evolve throughout the book to reflect this process of change.

The early chapters discuss some queer history, culture, and politics in Gujarat. Footprints of a Queer History primarily shares the stories of queer people, especially trans men, in the chapters that follow. Alongside these stories, it discusses how queer people in Gujarat worked within the political and legal landscape to live their lives. One custom, Maitri Karar, or friendship contract, allowed people to sign contracts to codify a relationship and living arrangement without marriage. Some queer women signed these contracts with their partners and lived together with some legal tolerance and rights. Sharma documents other legal strategies employed by queer people, as well as the advice and financial assistance provided to them by Vikalp.

In the rest of the book, Sharma shares personal stories. These include those of Shashi, a trans woman who experiences obstacles in the Hijra community, Amitaben, a sex worker, Mataji, a follower of Goddess Dasha Maa who experiences gender fluidity, trans people like Ankit and Virat, and another person who wrote a letter to Vikalp in 2002 describing gender identity and relationship changes. She includes the stories of her own interviews, interactions, and thoughts concerning her subjects. Many of the stories document how queer people pursued authentic choices in living and relationships but dealt with violence, rejection and societal intolerance as well. Sharma also discusses her own opinions on many of the topics written about, including sex work, violence, and preferred pronouns.^{:163}

== Development ==
Maya Sharma published her first work, Loving Women: Being Lesbian in Unprivileged India, in 2006. It was the first book to provide a detailed study of the lives of working-class queer women and trans people in India.^{:20-21} Sharma identifies as a lesbian, feminist, and non-academic activist. She has worked for years with Vikalp, a group founded to support Gujarat women dealing with domestic violence, which expanded to help with discrimination issues across identities. A subgroup called Sabrang supported trans people, especially transmasculine people and their partners.

Sharma explained that she gathered the stories included in Footprints of a Queer History during her work with Vikalp, both in documenting her work and in recording stories for personal pleasure. She also collected stories via other activists and connections via Vikalp and Sabrang. Sharma believes that more queer history needs to be documented, saying that younger generations should learn how to write letters for the sake of later archives.

Nanjani Gandhi credited Yoda Press for its publication of the book. Gandhi named it as one of the few companies interested in publishing works like this one, due to being one of very few alternative presses in India.

== Reception ==
Footprints of a Queer History won the inaugural Rainbow Award for Nonfiction in 2023.

Gaysi's Saurabh Sharma reviewed it as a delightful book that centers the voices of its storytellers and reveals the structures and policies that regulate bodies and desire. Chintan Girish Modi, reviewing for Business Standard, questions the ethical decisions Sharma made while interviewing her book's subjects, but recommended the book for people who wanted to learn more about underreported parts of the Indian LGBTQIA+ movement. Footprints of a Queer History was also positively reviewed by Nanjani Gandhi in the South Asia Multidisciplinary Academic Journal as a record of overlooked experiences that would be useful to scholars and policymakers.
