= The Grammar of My Body =

2023 memoir by Abhishek Anicca

- Author: Abhishek Anicca
- Language: English
- Genre: Memoir, Essay collection
- Publisher: Vintage Books (Penguin Random House)
- Pages: 256
- ISBN: 978-0-670-09845-3

The Grammar of My Body: A Memoir is a 2023 memoir by Abhishek Anicca. It won the 2024 Rainbow Award for Non-Fiction.

== Contents ==
The memoir is written in the form of a collection of 41 essays. Abhishek Anicca writes about his youth and adulthood, and how his relationship to his body has shifted over his life. He discusses living with disability and chronic illness: identities he did not have to confront until adulthood. As a child, he felt unlucky to endure frequent health issues, but during his 20s, his body started betraying him in public, exposing him to more societal ableism and constraining him from living as he would like to. He discovered he had been born with VATER syndrome, and discusses how he processed and adapted to his progressing disability. He talks about the vulnerability of sharing these experiences, and how he has grappled with self-hatred, internalised ableism, the dynamics of care-giving, and finding the energy to live and love after focusing on survival.

Anicca writes about how stigma and ableism have made tasks like finding a home and flying on planes much harder, and how he has had to advocate and engage in activism for everyday situations to improve. He critiques societal expectations of disabled people, talking about the harms of inspiration porn, or content made to inspire able-bodied people and exceptionalise disabled people. He talks about how able-bodied people erase and ignore disabled people, and how the discomfort of able-bodied people shapes what he can share about his life. He also discusses friendship, romance, and sexuality, sharing how these are affected by disability and societal norms. Anicca discusses finding solidarity with different communities and connecting with people online, where he also discovers queer community and practices.

== Creation ==
Anicca is a writer and poet, and uses writing to help process and heal from traumatic events. He began writing some of the essays in this collection as personal reflections during different periods of his life, but later expanded them into publication form to support his activism via a book. He wanted the memoir to spark conversations about ableism and privilege, helping able-bodied people truly consider the lives of disabled people and how to support people in a more empathetic society. Anicca later explained:

I don’t want my book to be appreciated just for being a book about disability and illness. It should speak to you. The writing should resonate. I hate tokenism and I never wrote the book for it to be just a disability book. It speaks to the readers on so many levels. They should be ready to listen. That’s all.

== Publication ==
The Grammar of My Body was published by Vintage Books, Penguin Random House India in 2023. Chirag Thakkar helped publish the memoir while working at Penguin, alongside a few other queer and marginalised works like Water in a Broken Pot and Urban Elites vs Union of India. K Vaishali also published an intersectional memoir in 2023: Homeless: Growing Up Lesbian and Dyslexic in India. She cited the publication of Homeless and The Grammar of My Body as examples of the publishing industry paying more attention to intersectional identities in 2023 than they had previously.

== Reception ==
The Grammar of My Body won the 2024 Rainbow Award for Non-Fiction Book of the Year.

Deepansh Duggal, reviewing for the Hindustan Times, named the memoir an essential read for its honesty and writing quality. Duggal praised the book's humour, poetry, and activism. He concluded that the book was a good primer for able-bodied people to understand the lives of people with disabilities better. Jerry Pinto praised the book as one of the best published in 2023 that he had read that year. Akankshya Abismruta, reviewing for The Federal, found the memoir to be a captivating read and praised its vulnerability and cultural commentary. Priyanka Chakarabarty, for The Chakkar, noted the book's "radical vulnerability" and praised Anicca's honesty and empowering perspective.
