= University of Aruba =

University in Oranjestad, Aruba

Coordinates: 12.5234°N 70.0342°W

- Universiteit van Aruba
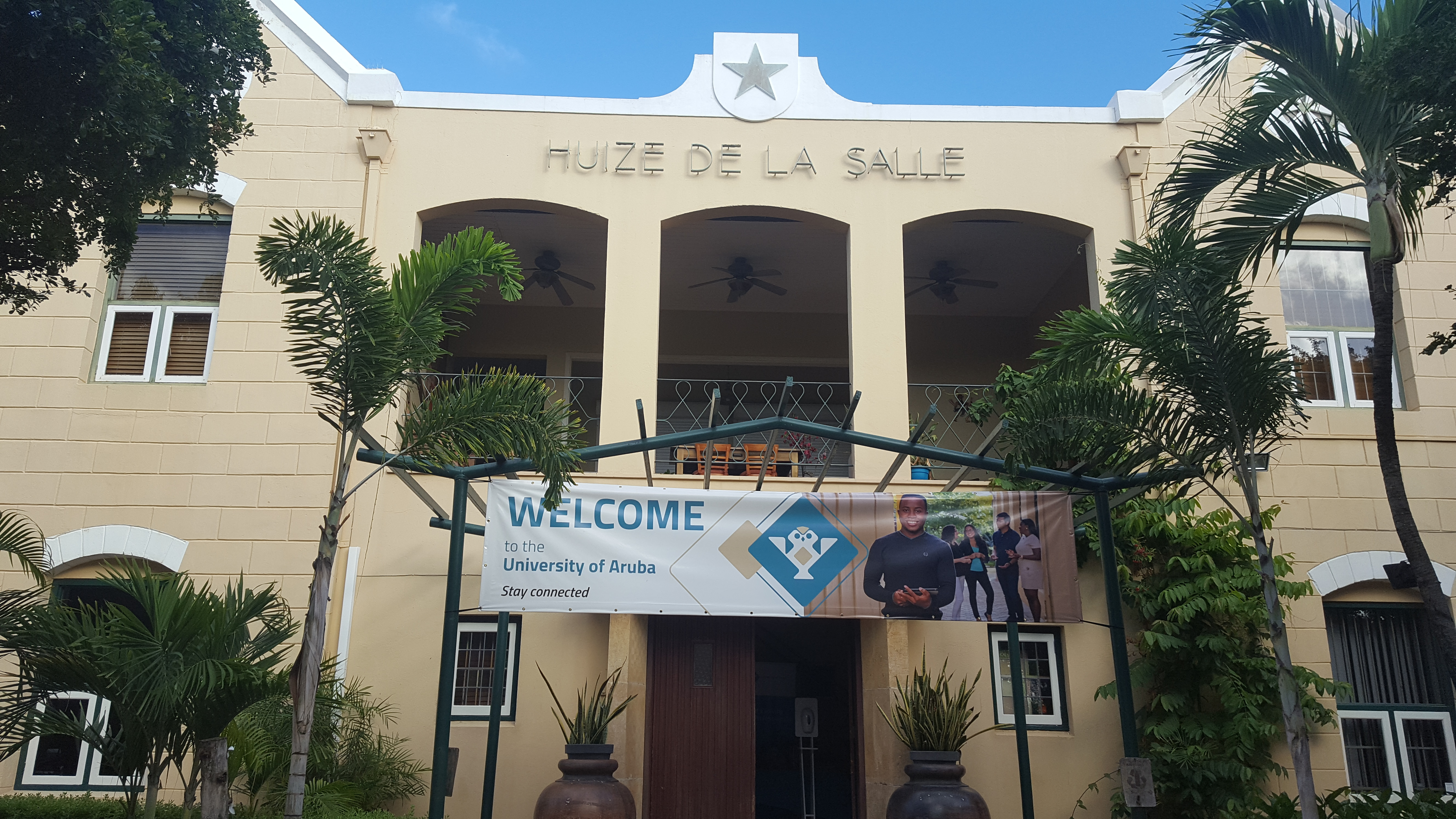
- Established: 1988
- Academic affiliations: Erasmus+
- Rector: Sue- Ann Lee
- Students: 650
- Location: J. Irausquinplein 4, Oranjestad, Aruba
- Language: English & Dutch
- Website: ua.aw

The University of Aruba (UA) is a public university located in Oranjestad, Aruba.

== History ==
The university was established in 1988, shortly after Aruba obtained its Status Aparte in 1986 and became an independent country within the Kingdom of the Netherlands. As stipulated by law in the national ordinance that governs the UA, the three core tasks of the UA are education, research and service to society. currently consists of the Academic Foundation Year, 4 faculties, namely the Faculty of Law, the Financial-Economic Faculty, the Faculty of Hotel and Tourism Management Studies and the Faculty of Arts and Science.

The university is currently housed in a historical building complex that includes two monasteries Huize de la Salle and Maria Convent, as well as the Centro Educativo Christian. The monumental Maria Convent was added to the UA in 2024 after an intensive restoration, funded by the EU and coordinated by UNDP.

== Admission ==
Both a HAVO Diploma and a VWO Diploma can give immediate access to enter a bachelor program at the university some programs may require students to pass a specific track in the Academic Foundation Year in order to be accepted into their desired faculty.

Another possibility exists for students who have neither a VWO/HAVO diploma is by taking the university entrance exam called "colloquium doctum". Passing the entrance exams, immediately grants access to a students desired faculty.

== Faculties ==
UA provides undergraduate and postgraduate education in four faculties, with each faculty headed by a dean. The faculties the faculties of Law, Hospitality and Tourism Management, Arts and Science and Accounting, Finance and Marketing

=== Faculty of Law ===
The faculty offers both a Bachelor and Master in Aruban Law, with the possibility of completing the Master program in the Netherlands. the Bachelor program can be completed in 3 yrs full time or 4 yrs maximum. The Master's program takes 1 year.

=== Faculty for Accounting, Finance and Marketing ===
The FAFM offers a dynamic four – year full-time two major-minor bachelor programs in Finance & Control, and Marketing & Business. Students have the choice to pursue one of two the majors. The FAFM focuses both on theoretical courses and practical assignments to ensure a solid knowledge base and professional framework

=== Faculty of Hospitality and Tourism Management Studies ===
FHTMS focuses on conducting applied and scientific research and delivering services that benefit the Aruban hospitality community and tourism industry. The FHTMS consists of undergraduate and graduate programs. The three-year undergraduate program provides students with a scientific, research-based program emphasizing business principles and management theories in hospitality and the international tourism industry. The graduate program offers a business management development program leading to a Master of Business Administration (MBA) degree.

== Academics ==
The university is accredited by the Aruban Department of Education, and the Accreditation Organisation of the Netherlands and Flanders, which grants accreditation to institutions who meet a national system of regulations and quality assurance controls.

== Research ==
The University of Aruba Research Center (UARC) was established in 2023 in order to support the UA research task. Through the establishment of an open research repository the accessibility of research outputs is substantially increased. The center also supports UA-staff in the development of research proposals, research consortia and in the technical aspects of the execution and reporting of research projects.

== International Collaboration ==
The university is an Erasmus+ partner.
