= Rainbow Awards =

Indian award for LGBT+ literature and journalism

The Rainbow Awards
- Current: 2nd Rainbow Awards
- Awarded for: Exemplary affirmative work about the lives of sexual and gender minorities.
- Venue: Rainbow Lit Fest
- Country: India
- Presented by: Dwijen Dinanath Arts Foundation
- Eligibility: Indians, encompassing the Persons of Indian Origin as well as Overseas Citizens of India.
- First award: December 10, 2023; 2 years ago
- Website: therainbowawards.in

The Rainbow Awards are awards presented by Dwijen Dinanath Arts Foundation of India to recognize exemplary affirmative work about the lives of sexual and gender minorities in India.

The awards are exclusively for Indians, encompassing the Persons of Indian Origin as well as Overseas Citizens of India. The literature and journalism awards are only granted for English-language works, although English translations of works originally written in official Indian languages are also accepted.

== History ==
Sharif D Rangnekar, a former journalist, communications consultant and writer, founded Rainbow Awards. Recognizing the insufficient representation of sexual and gender minorities in mainstream awards, Rangnekar aimed to amplify their voices and ensure acknowledgment without confining them to rigid genres. Rangnekar emphasized the significance of ensuring the representation of diverse voices within sexual and gender minorities, particularly in India, given the varied cultural backgrounds and experiences of community members. Rangnekar stated that these as reason for establishment of Rainbow Awards.

== Categories ==
As of 2023, the following categories are awarded.

=== Lifetime ===
- The Lifetime Achievement Award is presented for profound contributions to the queer literary world.

=== Literature ===
- The Fiction of the Year is presented for novels, graphic novels or collections of short stories authored by a single author.
- The Non-fiction of the Year is presented for memoirs, biographies, history or other non-fictional works.

=== Journalism ===
- The Feature of the Year is presented for feature story published in digital or print media.
- The Op-Ed of the Year is presented for op-ed piece published in digital or print media.

== Entry process ==
The awards are exclusively for Indians, encompassing the persons of Indian origin as well as overseas citizens of India.

In the literature category, publishers have the option to nominate a maximum of two entries per sub-category for consideration. For self-published books, authors can directly nominate up to one entry for consideration.

In the journalism category, both digital and print media organizations, along with digital platforms that prioritize views and opinions over news, are eligible to nominate a maximum of two entries. Likewise, freelance writers have the opportunity to nominate up to two entries for consideration.

== Selection process ==
The jury members are chosen and announced before the commencement of the entry process. The jury excludes any patrons, advisors, partners, or employees of the Dwijen Dinanath Arts Foundation and its affiliate, Rainbow Lit Fest.

The juries evaluate the submissions and decide on the award winners. They invest approximately four months in reviewing the submissions, engaging in discussions among themselves to compile a long list. If a long list exists, it will be made public. The jury then proceeds with their assessments to create a shortlist, which is also released to the public. The jury further refines their evaluation to choose the winner, whose announcement takes place during the award ceremony.

== Winners ==
=== Lifetime ===
Lifetime Achievement Award
Year	Winner	Biography	Ref.
2023	Hoshang Merchant	A Hyderabad-based poet and professor best known for his anthology Yaraana.	
2024	Minakshi Sanyal		
2025	Saleem Kidwai	Historian	

=== Literature ===
Fiction of the Year
Year	Winner	Work	Ref.
2023	Niladri R. Chatterjee	Entering the Maze: Queer Fiction of Krishnagopal Mallick	
2024	Yashraj Goswami	Cockatoo	
2025	Santanu Bhattacharya	Deviants: The Queer Family Chronicles	

Non-fiction of the Year
Year	Winner	Work	Ref.
2023	Maya Sharma	Footprints of a Queer History: Life-Stories from Gujarat	
2024	Abishek Anicca	The Grammar of My Body	
2025	Arundhati Ghosh	All Our Loves: Journeys with Polyamory in India	

=== Journalism ===
Feature of the Year
Year	Winner	Work	Ref.
2023	Akhil Kang	"Brahmin Men Who Love to Eat A**"	
2024	Smitha Tumuluru	"Everyone Accepts Me The Way I Am"	
2025	Naina Bhargava	"Love and Loss in Multai"	

Op-Ed of the Year
Year	Winner	Work	Ref.
2023	Chittajit Mitra	"Queering Translation: Locating Queerness in Indian Languages"	
2024	Shruti Sunderraman	"Where do the quiet gays go?"	
2025	Katyayini Saksham	"Can Trans Women Ever "Identify" as Women in India?"	

== See also ==
- List of LGBT-related awards
- Felix-Rexhausen Award
- GLAAD Media Award
