= Homo LesBische Federatie Nederland =

Homo LesBische Federatie Nederland (HLBF.nl) is an organization for gay, lesbian, and bisexual people in the Netherlands, Netherlands Antilles, and Aruba. The organization was founded June 14, 2004 in Breda.

== See also ==
- LGBT rights in the Netherlands
- List of LGBT rights organizations
