= Prix République du Glamour =

French literary award for lesbian fiction

Founded in 2008, the prix République du Glamour (in English, the Republic of Glamour prize) annually rewards the best French lesbian novels. The novel is chosen each year by the editor of the eponymous magazine. The first authors rewarded were

- Naomi Alderman for her novel La Désobéissance (2008)
- Isabelle Gagnon, an author Québécoise, for Le Souffle des Baleines (2008)

The second group of authors included only one:

- Véronique Bréger for her novel Les Chroniques d'Ouranos (2009)
