= Blue Metropolis Violet Prize =

Canadian literary award for LGBT writers

The Blue Metropolis Violet Prize is a Canadian literary award, presented to an established LGBTQ writer to honour their body of work. Created by writer Christopher DiRaddo for Blue Metropolis, a literary festival in Montreal, Quebec, as part of its LGBTQ-themed Violet Metropolis series, the award was first issued in 2018 and alternates between English language and French language writers.

The award acts as a complement, rather than competition, to the Dayne Ogilvie Prize, which honours emerging Canadian LGBTQ writers. The award's corporate sponsor is Air Canada.

== Winners ==
- 2018 – Nicole Brossard
- 2019 – Dionne Brand
- 2020 – Festival cancelled due to the COVID–19 pandemic in Canada; award not presented.
- 2021 – André Roy
- 2022 – Tomson Highway
- 2023 – Michel Marc Bouchard
- 2024 – Sky Gilbert
- 2025 – France Daigle
- 2026 – Shani Mootoo
