= COC Nederland =

Dutch LGBTQ+ rights group

Logotype

COC Nederland, also known as COC Netherlands, is a Dutch LGBTQ+ rights group founded in 1946. COC originally stood for Cultuur en Ontspanningscentrum (Center for Culture and Leisure), which was intended as a "cover" name for its real purpose. It is the oldest existing LGBT organization in the world.

Since 2000 it has a federated structure of 24 local associations, united on national level in the "Federatie van Nederlandse Verenigingen tot Integratie van Homoseksualiteit COC Nederland" (Federation of Dutch Associations for Integration of Homosexuality COC Netherlands), or COC Nederland for short. All the local associations combined have about 7,000 members.

== Activities ==
The local organizations focus on activities and advocacy within their region. They offer personal support, support groups, information, giving educational lessons at high schools, and provide venues where gays and lesbians can meet. They also promote lesbian and homosexual interest. The local organizations are run almost exclusively by volunteers.

The national COC focusses on advocacy on a national level, for instance with political lobbies (homosexuality and education, equal treatment). It also trains volunteers from the local organizations in providing information and leading support groups. The COC focuses on youth via "Stichting Hoezo/Expreszo", who publish the Expreszo magazine for gay, lesbian and bisexual youth.

COC also works internationally, especially in various Eastern European and Central Asian countries, where it is involved in: mapping the LGBT community, helping with training, providing internships in The Netherlands and providing local support and advice. These projects are co-financed by the Dutch Foreign Office. COC also cooperates with development organizations such as Oxfam Novib.

== History ==
On 7 December 1946, the "Shakespeareclub" was founded in Amsterdam. The founders were a number of gay men who were active with "Levensrecht" (Right To Live), This magazine was founded a few months before the German invasion in 1940, and re-appeared after the war. The Shakespeareclub was renamed in 1949 to "Cultuur- en Ontspanningscentrum" (C.O.C.). From its beginning in 1946 until 1962, the chairman was Bob Angelo, a pseudonym of Niek Engelschman.

The goals of the C.O.C. were twofold: they wanted to contribute to social emancipation, and also wanted to offer culture and recreation for gay men and lesbian women. The social emancipation focused on getting article 248bis in the Wetboek van Strafrecht (the main code for Dutch criminal law) revoked. This 1911 article made sexual contact with someone of the same sex between 16 and 21 years old punishable by up to one year imprisonment. For heterosexuals, the age of consent was 16. In the first years the authorities kept an eye on the Shakespearclub and the C.O.C.. Despite this, it expanded to The Hague and Rotterdam, and after that to Utrecht and Arnhem. In other cities such as Groningen, Leeuwarden and Eindhoven attempts by homosexuals to organize met with resistance from the local authorities.

An important consequence of the activities of the C.O.C. in the 1950s and 1960s was the emergence of a subculture with bars and dances, as opposed to the pre-war situation where homosexuals mainly met in parks, on the streets and in public urinals. In 1962 Benno Premsela took over from Bob Angelo. With the new chairman, the C.O.C. became more public; evident for example in their name change in 1964: The "Cultuur- en Ontspanningscentrum" became the "Nederlandse Vereniging voor Homofielen COC" (Dutch Association for Homophiles COC); for the first time making clear it was an organization for homosexuals.

In the 1970s homosexuality was more broadly accepted. The resistance from churches, the medical community and society in general diminished. This resulted in article 248-bis being revoked in 1971, and the official recognition of the COC in 1973. Since 1971 the COC's full name was "Nederlandse Vereniging voor Integratie van Homoseksualiteit COC" (Dutch Association for Integration of Homosexuality COC). The 1970s however were also a period of radicalization. Until then, the COC primarily focused on changing homosexuals to a heterosexual environment, but voices rose to have an own place for homosexuals in society, independent of the heterosexuals, and with preservation of their own identity. Because of the sexual revolution an active sex-culture formed in the gay community. More gay organizations were formed besides the COC. Although the COC stayed the largest gay organization, it lost influence and focused more on politics. It developed more and more into a sort of gay-union. In the 1980s - the years when AIDS first became an issue - the Dutch government accepted the COC as a discussion partner on gay issues. Despite that, the introduction of same-sex marriage in the Netherlands has to be attributed mostly to the Gay Krant: until the mid-1990s the COC kept the position that marriage as an institution had to be rejected.

Also, the management had some stability problems. The last management crisis was in the summer of 2004. As a result of a conflict about the functioning of the chairman of the COC office, both the chairman and the management had to leave. The affair led to the founding of the Homo LesBische Federatie Nederland, an initiative from John Blankenstein. After some hesitation, a good relation was formed between the two organizations.

== Legacy ==
The Homomonument symbolically points to the role of the COC in the LGBT movement in the Netherlands. One of the points of the triangle making up the monument points to the (former) office of COC Amsterdam.

== See also ==
- LGBT rights in the Netherlands
- List of LGBT rights organizations

== Literature ==
- Wayne R. Dynes Encyclopedia of Homosexuality: Volume II, p. 889-890
