= Blue Metropolis =

International festival from 1999

Blue Metropolis (also known as Blue Met) is an international literary festival held annually in Montreal. Founded in 1999 by Montreal writer Linda Leith, it is considered the world's first multilingual literary festival.

The festival is put on by Blue Metropolis Foundation, a nonprofit organization established in 1997 that offers educational and social programs.

== History ==
In 1996, three Montreal writers and members of the Writer's Union of Canada (Linda Leith, Ann Charney, and Mary Soderstrom) organized the literary event 'Write pour écrire' in partnership with the Union des écrivaines et des écrivains québécois (UNEQ).

In 1997, Leith established Blue Metropolis Foundation as a foundation 'created by writers and readers for writers and readers'.

The first Blue Metropolis Montreal International Literary Festival took place April 19 to 23, 1997. Its programming, which took place in French and English, included the first Blue Metropolis Translation Slam as well as literacy/community writing activities, readings, on-stage interviews, and panel discussions.

After the event, the foundation expanded by organizing educational programs for young people from primary school to cégep levels.

The name 'Blue Metropolis' was partially inspired by the philosophical essay 'On Being Blue', in which the American writer William H. Gass investigates the many different and contradictory connotations of the word 'blue'.

In 2017, the festival added 'Violet Metropolis, an LGBTQ-themed stream, in conjunction with the city's existing Violet Hour reading series. In 2018, the festival created the Blue Metropolis Violet Prize to honor Canadian LGBTQ writers.

== Awards ==
The festival presents a number of annual awards.

=== Blue Metropolis International Literary Grand Prize ===
- Marie-Claire Blais (2000)
- Norman Mailer (2001)
- Mavis Gallant (2002)
- Maryse Condé (2003)
- Paul Auster (2004)
- Carlos Fuentes (2005)
- Michel Tremblay (2006)
- Margaret Atwood (2007)
- Daniel Pennac (2008)
- A. S. Byatt (2009)
- Dany Laferrière (2010)
- Amitav Ghosh (2011)
- Joyce Carol Oates (2012)
- Colm Tóibín (2013)
- Richard Ford (2014)
- Nancy Huston (2015)
- Anne Carson (2016)
- Anita Desai (2017)
- Charles Taylor (2018)
- Annie Proulx (2019)

=== Premio Metropolis Azul ===
In 2013, the festival announced a new prize, the Premio Metropolis Azul. The prize is awarded to works which explore some aspect of Hispanophone culture or history and given annually to an author from any country or region for a work of fiction written in Spanish, English, or French. The prize is sponsored by Ginny Stikeman.

- Sergio Ramírez, La fugitiva (2013)
- Luis Alberto Urrea, Queen of America (2014)
- Junot Díaz (2015)
- Valeria Luiselli (2016)
- Francisco Goldman (2017)
- Leila Guerriero (2018)

=== Blue Metropolis First Peoples Prize ===
The Blue Metropolis First Peoples Prize is awarded to a North American Indigenous writer for a work in any genre.

- Annharte (2015)
- Thomas King (2016)
- David Treuer (2017)
- Lee Maracle (2018)

=== Blue Metropolis Words to Change Prize ===
The Blue Metropolis Words to Change Prize is awarded to a writer whose work connects linguistic, religious, ethnic or other communities.

- Gene Luen Yang (2015)
- Abdourahman Waberi (2016)
- Imbolo Mbue (2017)
- Charif Majdalani (2018)

=== Literary Diversity Prize ===
In 2016 the festival announced a new prize in association with the Conseil des arts de Montréal. The work is awarded to a first or second generation migrant to Quebec, residing in Montreal, from a multi-cultural community, written in French or English, for a first publication in Quebec.

- Ghayas Hachem, Play Boys (2016)
- Xue Yiwei, Shenzheners (2017)
- Alina A Dumitrescu, Le cimetière des abeilles (2018)

=== Blue Metropolis Violet Prize ===
The Blue Metropolis Violet Prize, created in 2018, honors an established LGBTQ writer for their body of work.

=== Blue Metropolis Al Majidi Ibn Dhaher Arab Literary Prize ===
The festival previously awarded the Blue Metropolis Al Majidi Ibn Dhaher Arab Literary Prize. Named after the 17th-century poet al-Majidi ibn Dhaher, the prize was initiated in 2007 and is worth CAD $5,000. The prize was sponsored by the Abu Dhabi Authority for Culture and Heritage. Dr Issa J Boullata served as consultant for the prize and the jury was composed of an international roster of poets, novelists, and literary professionals. The prize is currently on hiatus.

- Elias Khoury (2007)
- Saadi Youssef (2008)
- Zakaria Tamer (2009)
- Joumana Haddad (2010)
- Alaa Al Aswany (2011)
- Ahdaf Soueif (2012)
- Hisham Matar (2013)
- Habib Selmi (2014)
