= Liberalism and progressivism within Islam =

Liberalism and progressivism within Islam, or simply Islamic liberalism or Islamic progressivism, refers to a range of interpretations of Islamic thought and practice, generally associated with religiously liberal or progressive views. Some Muslims have created a considerable body of progressive interpretation of Islamic understanding and practice. Their work is sometimes characterized as progressive (Arabic: الإسلام التقدمي al-Islām at-taqaddumī) or liberal Islam. Some scholars, such as Omid Safi, differentiate between "progressive Muslims" (post-colonial, anti-imperialist, and critical of modernity and the West) versus "liberal advocates of Islam" (an older movement embracing modernity). Liberal Islam originally emerged from the Islamic revivalist movement of the 18th–19th centuries. Liberal ideas are considered controversial by some traditional fundamentalist Muslims, who criticize liberal Muslims on the grounds of being too Western and/or rationalistic.

The methodologies of liberal and progressive Islam rest on the re-interpretation of traditional Islamic sacred scriptures (the Quran) and other texts (the Hadith), a process called ijtihad. This reinterpreting can vary from minor to fundamental, including re-interpretation based on the belief that while the meaning of the Quran is a revelation, its expression in words is the work of the Islamic prophet Muhammad in his particular time and context.

Liberal Muslims see themselves as returning to the principles of the early ummah and as promoting the ethical and pluralistic intent of the Quran. The reform movement uses monotheism (tawhid) as "an organizing principle for human society and the basis of religious knowledge, history, metaphysics, aesthetics, and ethics, as well as social, economic and world order".

Views associated with Liberal Islam encompass the promotion of progressive values such as democracy, gender equality, human rights, LGBT rights, women's rights, religious pluralism, interfaith marriage, freedom of expression, freedom of thought, and freedom of religion; opposition to theocracy and total rejection of Islamism and Islamic fundamentalism; and a modern view of Islamic theology, ethics, sharia, culture, tradition, and other ritualistic practices in Islam. Liberal Muslims claim that the re-interpretation of the Islamic scriptures is important in order to preserve their relevance in the 21st century.

== Background in Islamic philosophy ==
The rise of Islam, based on both the transmission of the Quran and the life of Muhammad, strongly altered the power balances and perceptions of origin of power in the Mediterranean region. Early Islamic philosophy emphasized an inexorable link between religion and science, and the process of ijtihad to find truth — in effect, all philosophy was "political" as it had real implications for governance. This view was challenged by the "rationalist" Muʿtazilite philosophers, who held a more Hellenistic view, emphasizing reason above revelation, and as such are known to modern scholars as the first speculative theologians of Islam; they were supported by a secular aristocracy who sought freedom of action independent of the Caliphate. By the late ancient period, the "traditionalist" Ashʿarīte theology had in general triumphed over rationalists. According to the Ashʿarītes, reason must be subordinate to the Quran and the sunnah.

=== Ibn Rushd ===
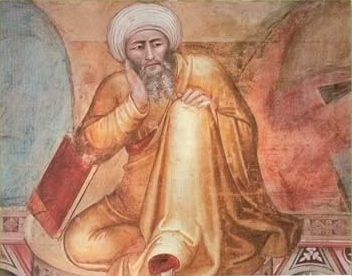
Ibn Rushd was the preeminent philosopher in the history of Al-Andalus. 14th-century painting by Andrea di Bonaiuto

Ibn Rushd (1126–1198) often Latinized as Averroes, was an Andalusian polymath. Being described as "founding father of secular thought in Western Europe", he was known by the nickname the Commentator for his commentaries on Aristotle's works. His main work was The Incoherence of the Incoherence in which he defended philosophy against al-Ghazali's claims in The Incoherence of the Philosophers. His other works were the Fasl al-Maqal and the Kitab al-Kashf. Ibn Rushd presented an argument in Fasl al-Maqal (Decisive Treatise) providing a justification for the emancipation of science and philosophy from official Ash'ari theology and that there is no inherent contradiction between philosophy and religion; thus Averroism has been considered a precursor to modern secularism. Ibn Rushd accepts the principle of women's equality. According to him, they should be educated and allowed to serve in the military; the best among them might be tomorrow's philosophers or rulers. The 13th-century philosophical movement in Latin Christian and Jewish tradition based on Ibn Rushd's work is called Averroism. Ibn Rushd became something of a symbolic figure in the debate over the decline and proposed revitalization of Islamic thought and Islamic society in the late 20th century. A notable proponent of such a revival of Averroist thought in Islamic society was Mohammed Abed al-Jabri with his Critique de la Raison Arabe (1982).

== Islamic Modernists ==
=== Rifa'a al-Tahtawi ===
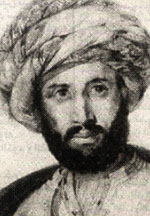
Rifa'a al-Tahtawi, 1801–1873

Egyptian Egyptologist and Arab Renaissance intellectual Rifa'a al-Tahtawi (1801−1873) is considered one of the early proponents of Islamic Modernism. Islamic Modernists attempted to integrate Islamic principles with European social theories. In 1831, Rifa'a al-Tahtawi was part of the statewide effort to modernize the Egyptian infrastructure and education. They introduced his Egyptian audience to Enlightenment ideas such as secular authority and political rights and liberty; his ideas about what constituted a modern, civilized society and, by extension, a "good Egyptian"; and his ideas on public interest and public good. Tahtawi's work was the first effort in what became an Egyptian renaissance (nahda) that flourished in the years between 1860 and 1940.

In 1826, Al-Tahtawi was sent to Paris by Mehmet Ali. There, he studied at an educational mission for five years, returning in 1831. Tahtawi was appointed director of the School of Languages. At the school, he worked translating European books into Arabic. Tahtawi was instrumental in translating military manuals, geography, and European history. In total, al-Tahtawi supervised the translation of over 2,000 foreign works into Arabic. He even made favorable comments about French society in some of his books. Tahtawi stressed that the Principles of Islam are compatible with those of European Modernity. In his piece, The Extraction of Gold or an Overview of Paris, Tahtawi discusses the patriotic responsibility of citizenship. He uses Roman civilization as an example of what could become of Islamic civilizations; at one point, all Romans are united under one Caesar but split into East and West. After splitting, the two nations see "all its wars ended in defeat, and it retreated from a perfect existence to nonexistence." Tahtawi understands that if Egypt is unable to remain united, it could fall prey to outside invaders. He stresses the importance of citizens defending the patriotic duty of their country. One way to protect one's country, according to Tahtawi, is to accept the changes that come with a modern society.

=== Muhammad Abduh ===
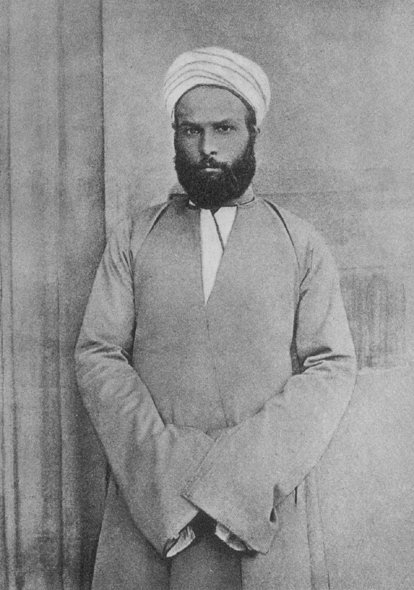
Muhammad Abduh (1849–1905)

Egyptian Islamic jurist and religious scholar Muhammad Abduh (1849—1905), regarded as one of the key founding figures of Islamic Modernism, broke the rigidity of the Muslim ritual, dogma, and family ties. Abduh argued that Muslims could not simply rely on the interpretations of texts provided by medieval clerics, they needed to use reason to keep up with changing times. He said that in Islam, man was not created to be led by a bridle, man was given intelligence so that he could be guided by knowledge. According to Abduh, a teacher's role was to direct men towards study. He believed that Islam encouraged men to detach from the world of their ancestors and that Islam reproved the slavish imitation of tradition. He said that the two greatest possessions relating to religion that man was graced with were independence of will and independence of thought and opinion. It was with the help of these tools that he could attain happiness. He believed that the growth of Western civilization in Europe was based on these two principles. He thought that Europeans were roused to act after a large number of them were able to exercise their choice and to seek out facts with their minds. In his works, he portrays God as educating humanity from its childhood through its youth and then on to adulthood. According to him, Islam is the only religion whose dogmas can be proven by reasoning. He was against polygamy and thought that it was an archaic custom. He believed in a form of Islam that would liberate men from enslavement, provide equal rights for all human beings, abolish the religious scholar's monopoly on exegesis, and abolish racial discrimination and religious compulsion.

Muhammad Abduh claimed in his book Al-Idtihad fi Al-Nasraniyya wa Al-Islam that no one had exclusive religious authority in the Islamic world. He argued that the Caliph did not represent religious authority, because he was not infallible nor was the Caliph the person to whom the revelation was given; therefore, according to Abduh, the Caliph and other Muslims are equal. ʿAbduh argued that the Caliph should have the respect of the ummah but not rule it; the unity of the umma is a moral unity which does not prevent its division into national states. Mohammad Abduh made great efforts to preach harmony between Sunnis and Shias. Broadly speaking, he preached brotherhood between all schools of thought in Islam. Abduh regularly called for better friendship between religious communities. As Christianity was the second biggest religion in Egypt, he devoted special efforts towards friendship between Muslims and Christians. He had many Christian friends and many a time he stood up to defend Copts.

== Other Islamic thinkers ==
=== Nasr Hamid Abu Zayd ===
Egyptian Qur'anic post-modern thinker, author, academic Nasr Hamid Abu Zayd is one of the leading liberal theologians in Islam. He is known for his project of a humanistic Qur'anic hermeneutics, which "challenged mainstream views" on the Qur'an sparking "controversy and debate". While not denying that the Qur'an was of divine origin, Zayd argued that it was a "cultural product" that had to be read in the context of the language and culture of seventh century Arabs, and could be interpreted in more than one way. He also criticized the use of religion to exert political power. In 1995 an Egyptian Sharia court declared him an apostate, this led to threats of death and his fleeing Egypt several week later. He later "quietly" returned to Egypt where he died. According to scholar Navid Kermani "three key themes" emerge from Abu Zayd's work:

1. to trace the various interpretations and historical settings of the single Qur'anic text from the early days of Islam up to the present;
2. to demonstrate the "interpretational diversity" (al-ta 'addud alta 'wili) that exists within the Islamic tradition;
3. and to show how this diversity has been "increasingly neglected" across Islamic history.

Abu Zayd saw himself as an heir to the Muʿtazila, "particularly their idea of the created Qurʿān and their tendency toward metaphorical interpretation". Abu Zayd strongly opposed the belief in a "single, precise and valid interpretation of the Qur'an handed down by the Prophet for all times". In his view, the Quran made Islamic Arab culture a 'culture of the text` (hadarat al-nass) par excellence, but because the language of the Quran is not self-explanatory, this implied Islamic Arab culture was also a culture of interpretation (hadarat al-ta'wil). Abu Zayd emphasized "intellect" (`aql) in understanding the Quran, as opposed to "a hermeneutical approach which gives priority to the narrated traditions [ hadith ]" (naql). As a reflection of this Abu Zayd used the term ta'wil (interpretation) for efforts to understand the Quran, while in the Islamic sciences, the literature that explained the Quran was referred to as tafsir (commentary, explanation). For Abu Zayd, interpretation goes beyond explanation or commentary, "for without" the Qur'an would not have meaning:

The [Qur'anic] text changed from the very first moment - that is, when the Prophet recited it at the moment of its revelation - from its existence as a divine text (nass ilahi), and became something understandable, a human text (nass insani), because it changed from revelation to interpretation (li-annahu tahawwala min al-tanzil ila al-ta'wil). The Prophet's understanding of the text is one of the first phases of movement resulting from the text's connection with the human intellect.

Abu Zayd's critical approach to classical and contemporary Islamic discourse in the fields of theology, philosophy, law, politics, and humanism, promoted modern Islamic thought that might enable Muslims to build a bridge between their own tradition and the modern world of freedom of speech, equality (minority rights, women's rights, social justice), human rights, democracy and globalisation.

=== Socialist Shi'ism ===
Socialist Shi'ism had a significant impact on the first and so far only Islamist revolution, the 1979 Iranian Revolution by giving a radical political interpretation to the religious themes of Shia Islam. Socialist Shi'ism arose from a 1970s movement of young secular-educated leftists in majority-Shia Iran who sought a socialist revolution to overthrow the pro-American authoritarian monarchy of Shah Mohammad Reza Shah. Although a socialist revolution never came, the Shah was overthrown by the Islamist revolution, whose leader, the Ayatollah Ruhollah Khomeini, borrowed many of the socialist Shia ideas and in doing so was able to draw crucial support from students and the Iranian middle class. In attempting to build their revolutionary force the Iranian socialists failed to establish "deep roots" with the Muslim Iranian masses who did not relate to Marxist concepts of rationalism, materialism, and atheism. Liberal and progressive movements in Iran were purged during the Cultural Revolution in Iran and 1981–1982 Iran massacres.

==== Ali Shariati ====
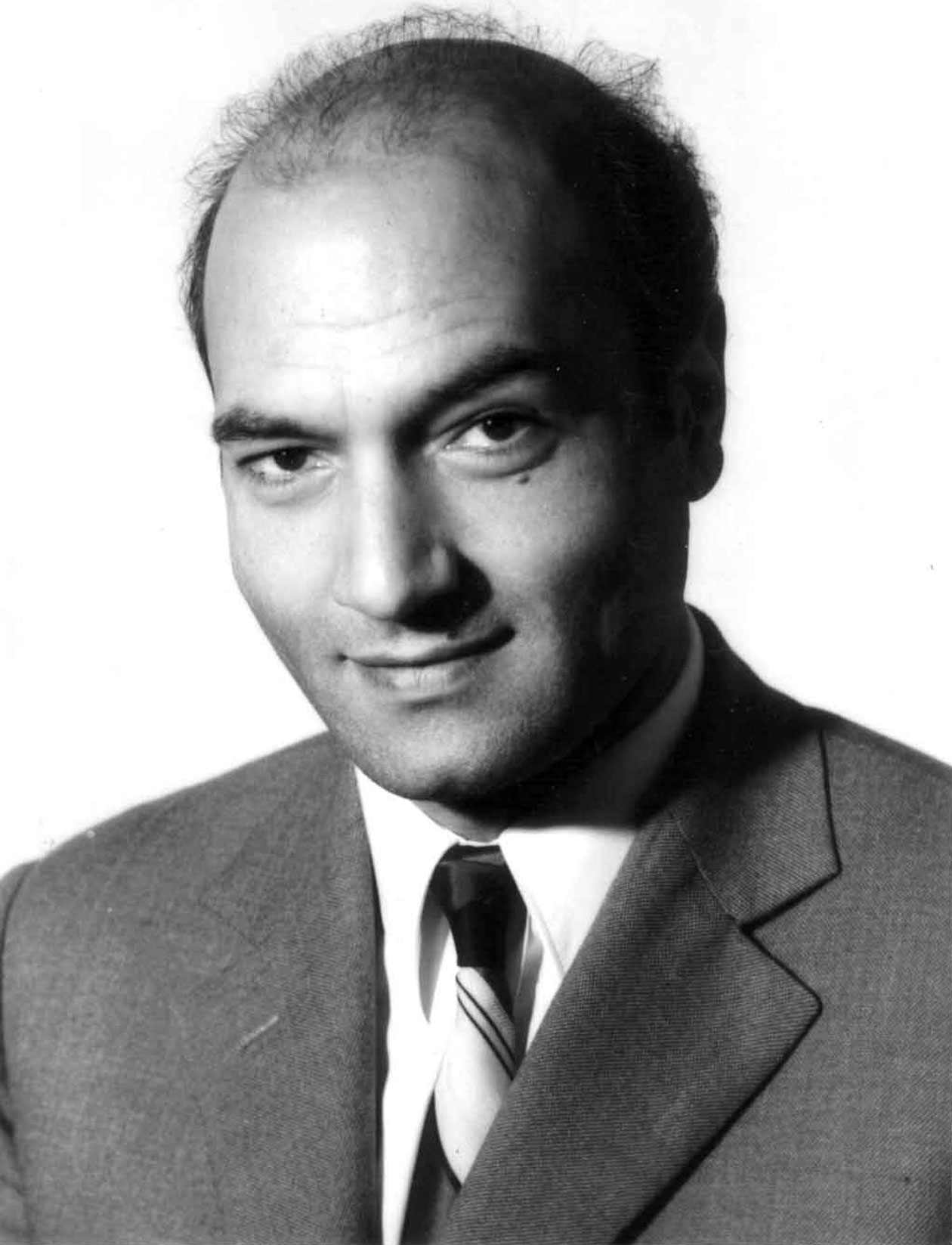
Ali Shariati

Ali Shariati Mazinani (Persian (1933–1977) was the leading member amongst the Shia socialists. He came from a "strictly religious family" but was a sociologist, not a religious scholar. He had studied in Paris and been influenced by the writings of Marxist-oriented writers such as Jean-Paul Sartre, Frantz Fanon, and Che Guevara.

Shariati intertwined the Shia belief in an inevitable elimination of injustice by the Mahdi with socialist revolution against the Iranian ruling class. Socialist Shia preached that Imam Hussein was not just a historical holy figure but the original oppressed one (mazloum), and his killer an analogue of the oppression experienced by the Iranian people under the Shah. His killing was not just an "eternal manifestation of the truth but a revolutionary act by a revolutionary hero". Shi'a should respond to his killing not with the traditional lamentation, flagellation, and patient awaiting of the return of the messiah, that the traditional clergy encouraged, but by fighting against the injustice of the state as Ali and Hussein had.

Shariati's harsh criticism of the traditional Usuli Shia clergy as standing in the way of the revolutionary potential of the masses, was met with fatwas. Ayatullah Hadi Milani, the influential Usuli Marja' in Mashhad during the 1970s, issued a fatwa prohibiting his followers from reading Ali Shariati's books and Islamist literature produced by young clerics. This fatwa was followed by similar ones from Ayatullah Mar'ashi Najafi, Ayatullah Muhammad Rouhani, Ayatullah Hasan Qomi, and others. Ayatullah Khomeini, however, refused to comment.

In addition to socialism, Shariati advocated women's rights, as evidenced in his book Fatima Is Fatima, where he argued that Fatima Zahra the daughter of the Islamic prophet Muhammad is as a role model for Muslim women around the world and a woman who was free.

Shariati did not advocate Western liberal democracy which he saw as involved in imperialist plundering of the developing world and advocated what he called "Commitment Democracy", which would be, according to Shariati, the government of Imam Ali. Shariati was influenced by anti-democratic Islamist ideas of Muslim Brotherhood thinkers in Egypt and tried to meet Muhammad Qutb while visiting Saudi Arabia in 1969.

Iran was a petroleum exporter and had relatively large sums to devote to education, which led to the creation of a relatively large number of post-secondary students. While Iranian peasants, proletariat, and lumpen proletariat did not respond to Socialist Shi'ism in large numbers, Shariati was phenomenally popular with students. The Islamic Marxist movements, most notably the People's Mujahideen, were strongly influenced by Shariati. Ayatollah Khomeini emphasized Shariati's themes of revolution, anti-imperialism, and the radical message of Muharram; and incorporated into his public declarations such 'Fanonist' terms as the 'mostazafin will inherit the earth', 'the country needs a cultural revolution', and the 'people will dump the exploiters onto the garbage heap of history.'"

==== Mahmoud Taleghani ====
Mahmoud Taleghani (1911–1979) was another Shia leftist and contemporary of Khomeini, but also a cleric and a veteran leader in his own right of the movement against Shah Mohammad Reza Pahlavi. A founding member of the Freedom Movement of Iran, he has been described as a representative of the tendency of many "Shia clerics to blend Shia with Marxist ideals in order to compete with leftist movements for youthful supporters" during the 1960s and 1970s. He served a total of a dozen years in prison, where he developed connections with leftist political prisoners and the influence of the left on his thinking was reflected in his famous book Islam and Ownership (Islam va Malekiyat) which argued in support of collective ownership "as if it were an article of faith in Islam."

Taleghani was instrumental in "shaping the groundswell movement" that led to the Iranian Revolution and served as chairman of the Revolutionary Council during the Islamic Revolution. He clashed with Khomeini in April 1979, warning the leadership against a 'return to despotism.'" After two of his sons were arrested by revolutionary Guards, thousands of his supporters marched in the streets chanting "Taleghani, you are the soul of the revolution! Down with the reactionaries!" Khomeini summoned Taleghani to Qom where he was given a severe criticism, after which the press was called, and Khomeini made a statement pointedly not referring to Taleghani as an Ayatollah. "Mr. Taleghani is with us, and he is sorry for what happened."

== Specific issues and doctrines ==
=== Ijtihad ===
Ijtihad (lit. "effort, physical or mental, expended in a particular activity") is an Islamic legal term referring to independent reasoning or the thorough exertion of a jurist's mental faculty in finding a solution to a legal question. It is contrasted with taqlid (imitation, conformity to legal precedent). According to classical Sunni theory, ijtihad requires expertise in the Arabic language, theology, revealed texts, and principles of jurisprudence (usul al-fiqh), and is not employed where authentic and authoritative texts (Qur'an and hadith) are considered unambiguous with regard to the question, or where there is an existing scholarly consensus (ijma). Ijtihad is considered to be a religious duty for those qualified to perform it. An Islamic scholar who is qualified to perform ijtihad is called a mujtahid.

Starting from the 18th century, some Muslim reformers began calling for the abandonment of taqlid and emphasis on ijtihad, which they saw as a return to Islamic origins. Public debates in the Muslim world surrounding ijtihad continue to the present day. The advocacy of ijtihad has been particularly associated with Islamic modernists. Among contemporary Muslims in the West, new visions of ijtihad have emerged, emphasizing substantive moral values over traditional juridical methodology.

=== Feminism ===
A combination of Islam and feminism has been advocated as "a feminist discourse and practice articulated within an Islamic paradigm" by Margot Badran in 2002. Islamic feminists ground their arguments in Islam and its teachings, seek the full equality of women and men in the personal and public sphere, and can include non-Muslims in the discourse and debate. Islamic feminism is defined by Islamic scholars as being more radical than secular feminism, and as being anchored within the discourse of Islam with the Quran as its central text.

During recent times, the concept of Islamic feminism has grown further with Islamic groups looking to garner support from many aspects of society. In addition, educated Muslim women are striving to articulate their role in society. Examples of Islamic feminist groups are the Revolutionary Association of the Women of Afghanistan, founded by Meena Keshwar Kamal, Muslim Women's Quest for Equality from India, and Sisters in Islam from Malaysia, founded by Zainah Anwar and Amina Wadud among other five women.

In 2014, the Selangor Islamic Religious Council (MAIS) issued a fatwa declaring that Sisters In Islam, as well as any other organisation promoting religious liberalism and pluralism, deviate from the teachings of Islam. According to the edict, publications that are deemed to promote liberal and pluralistic religious thinking are to be declared unlawful and confiscated, while social media is also to be monitored and restricted. As fatwas are legally binding in Malaysia, SIS is challenging it on constitutional grounds.

==== Hijab ====
While most Conservative Muslims believe the hijab is mandatory, many Progressive Muslims take alternate views.

In a fatwa, Khaled Abou El Fadl states that the Quran requires women only to cover their bosoms. Some progressive Muslim scholars dispute the traditional interpretation that the Qur'an requires women to cover their hair. In addition, he declares that it is an error for Muslim women to continue wearing a hijab if it brings them undue attention or puts her at risk of harm. Sheikh Mustapha Mohamed Rashed at Al-Azhar University similarly defended a thesis that concluded wearing a hijab is not a religious duty, and that the Quran only mandates a piece of cloth to cover breasts.

==== Wives' obedience to husbands ====
Verse An-Nisa 34 of the Quran has traditionally been interpreted as mandating wives' obedience to their husbands and beating as a punishment for disobedience, with the following translations from Mustafa Khattab and Sahih International:

Men are the caretakers of women, as men have been provisioned by Allah over women and tasked with supporting them financially. And righteous women are devoutly obedient and, when alone, protective of what Allah has entrusted them with. And if you sense ill-conduct from your women, advise them ˹first˺, ˹if they persist,˺ do not share their beds, ˹but if they still persist,˺ then discipline them ˹gently˺. But if they change their ways, do not be unjust to. Surely Allah is Most High, All-Great.

— Quran 4:34 ("The Clear Quran" translation by Mustafa Khattab)

Men are in charge of women by [right of] what Allāh has given one over the other and what they spend [for maintenance] from their wealth. So righteous women are devoutly obedient, guarding in [the husband's] absence what Allāh would have them guard. But those [wives] from whom you fear arrogance - [first] advise them; [then if they persist], forsake them in bed; and [finally], strike them [lightly]. But if they obey you [once more], seek no means against them. Indeed, Allāh is ever Exalted and Grand.

— Quran 4:34 (Sahih International translation)

However, Progressive Muslims have given many alternative interpretations and translations of the verse (such as a deterrent from anger-based domestic violence).

Riffat Hassan, has taken the view that qawwamun in the verse is not talking about men being superior to women, but rather is referring to men's role as breadwinners. Nushuz is interpreted as not referring to domestic disobedience but to a mass rebellion of all women against their role as child-bearers. Asma Barlas has taken a similar view that qawwamun means moral guidance or caring, nushuz means disharmony, and that wa-dribuhunna has multiple meanings, such as "to set an example" or "to separate", and that "to beat" is "the worst one!" of all possible interpretations.

Amina Wadud has stated that qawwamun refers to men's financial support of women while nushuz refers to disharmony in the relationship. She interprets wa-dribuhunna, the word often translated as "strike" or "beat", as being used in a non-literal sense.

Laleh Bakhtiar, in her Quran translation, The Sublime Quran, translated wa-dribuhunna as "to go away from" or "to leave", claiming the verse recommends husbands to leave their wives if there are irreconcilable disagreements and differences. She cites prophetic biographies claiming Muhammad never beat his wives and talking about his respect for women, and other Quran verses like 2:231.

Laury Silvers, based on the methodology of medieval Islamic thinker Ibn Arabi, believes that "God may intend all meanings, but it does not follow that he 'approves' of all meanings." Using this, she believes that the Quran has to be ambiguous, as if it weren't, there would be no room for human responsibility. Using this, she claims that Allah did intend for all meanings of wa-dribuhunna, including beating, and that true human morality comes from the freedom to choose the best of these interpretations. It is claimed Muhammad never beat his wives, and that his "conflicted response" to this revelation shows that God revealed it out of necessity (to restrain existing violence against women) rather than out of approval, and that it remains best to refrain from violence entirely.

Khaled Abou El Fadl claims nushuz is better understood as "a grave and known sin" and in 4:34, this is a lewd act or sexual sin that can be proven by evidence and verified by a judge. According to his interpretation, 4:34 is about how a judge would punish a woman for a sexual crime, rather than about wifely disobedience. Fatema Mernissi cites Quran 33:35 as evidence for gender equality within Islam and several hadith to claim that while beating was permissible, the best Muslims would never beat their wives.

Edip Yüksel in his Quran translation, The Quran: A Reformist Translation, interprets qawwamun as "supporters" rather than as "guardians" or "in charge of", citing other Quran verses using the word. Furthermore, he believes nushuz is not referring to disobedience, but instead an extramarital affair or marital disloyalty, citing Quran 4:128. Finally, he claims idribuhunna does not mean beating, but rather means separation, saying beating would not make sense with Quran 30:21 stating that marriage is tranquil.

=== Human rights ===
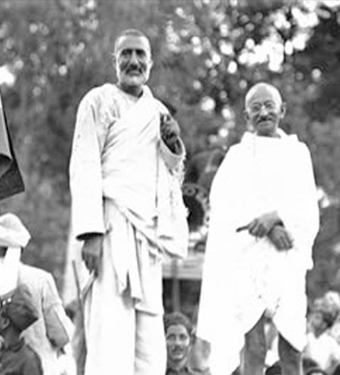
Abdul Ghaffar Khan with Mahatma Gandhi

Moderate Islamic political thought contends that the nurturing of the Muslim identity and the propagation of values such as democracy and human rights are not mutually exclusive, but rather should be promoted together. Many liberal Muslims argue that Islam promotes the notion of absolute equality of all humanity, and that it is one of its central concepts. Therefore, a breach of human rights has become a source of great concern to most liberal Muslims.

Liberal Muslims differ with their culturally conservative counterparts in that they believe that all humanity is represented under the umbrella of human rights. Many Muslim majority countries have signed international human rights treaties, although the impact of these largely remains to be seen in local legal systems. Muslim liberals often reject traditional interpretations of Islamic law, which allow Ma malakat aymanukum and slavery. They say that slavery opposed Islamic principles which they believe to be based on justice and equality and some say that verses relating to slavery or "Ma malakat aymanukum" now cannot be applied due to the fact that the world has changed, while others say that those verses are misinterpreted and twisted to legitimize slavery. In the 20th century, South Asian scholars Ghulam Ahmed Pervez and Amir Ali argued that the expression ma malakat aymanukum should be properly read in the past tense. When some called for a reinstatement of slavery in Pakistan upon its independence from the British colonial rule, Pervez argued that the past tense of this expression means that the Quran had imposed "an unqualified ban" on slavery. Liberal Muslims have argued against death penalty for apostasy based on the Quranic verse that "There shall be no compulsion in religion".

=== LGBTQ rights ===
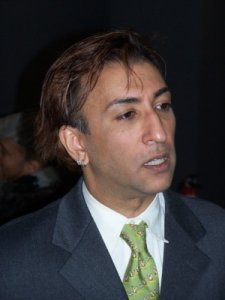
El-Farouk Khaki, founding member of Salaam group and the Toronto Unity Mosque / el-Tawhid Juma Circle

In January 2013, the Muslim Alliance for Sexual and Gender Diversity (MASGD) was launched. The organization was formed by members of the Queer Muslim Working Group, with the support of the National Gay and Lesbian Task Force. Several initial MASGD members previously had been involved with the Al-Fatiha Foundation, including Faisal Alam and Imam Daayiee Abdullah.

The Safra Project for women is based in the UK. It supports and works on issues relating to prejudice against LGBTQ Muslim women. It was founded in October 2001 by Muslim LBT women. The Safra Project's "ethos is one of inclusiveness and diversity". In Australia, Nur Wahrsage has been an advocate for LGBTI Muslims and founded Marhaba, a support group for queer Muslims in Melbourne, Australia. In May 2016, Wahrsage revealed that he is homosexual in an interview on SBS2’s The Feed, being the first openly gay Imam in Australia.

In Canada, Salaam was founded as the first gay Muslim organization in Canada and the second in the world. Salaam was founded in 1993 by El-Farouk Khaki, who organized the Salaam / Al-Fateha International Conference in 2003. In May 2009, the Toronto Unity Mosque / el-Tawhid Juma Circle (ETJC) was founded by Laury Silvers, a University of Toronto religious studies scholar, alongside Muslim gay-rights activists El-Farouk Khaki and Troy Jackson. Unity Mosque / ETJC is a gender-equal, LGBT+ affirming.

In November 2012, a prayer room was set up in Paris by gay Islamic scholar and founder of the group Homosexual Muslims of France, Ludovic-Mohamed Zahed. It was described by the press as the first gay-friendly mosque in Europe. The reaction from the rest of the Muslim community in France has been mixed, and the opening has been condemned by the Grand Mosque of Paris. Examples of Muslim LGBT media works are the 2006 Channel 4's documentary Gay Muslims, the film production company Unity Productions Foundation, the 2007 and 2015 documentary films A Jihad for Love and A Sinner in Mecca, both produced by Parvez Sharma, and the Jordanian LGBT publication My.Kali.

In March 2024, a hijra community in Mymensingh, Bangladesh opened the Dakshin Char Kalibari Masjid, a mosque built on government-allocated land after hijra worshippers had been turned away from local congregations.

==== Story of Lut ====
Quranic verses about the Story of Lut have traditionally been interpreted as condemning homosexuality, with the following translations of Al-A'raf 81 from Mustafa Khattab and Sahih International:

You lust after men instead of women! You are certainly transgressors.

— Quran 7:81 ("The Clear Quran" translation by Mustafa Khattab)

Indeed, you approach men with desire, instead of women. Rather, you are a transgressing people.

— Quran 7:81 (Sahih International translation)

Scott Siraj al-Haqq Kugle, a professor of Islamic Studies at Emory University, has argued for a different interpretation of the Lot narrative focusing not on the sexual act but on the infidelity of the tribe and their rejection of Lot's Prophethood. According to Kugle, "where the Qur'an treats same-sex acts, it condemns them only so far as they are exploitive or violent." More generally, Kugle notes that the Quran refers to four different levels of personality. One level is "genetic inheritance." The Qur'an refers to this level as one's "physical stamp" that "determines one's temperamental nature" including one's sexuality. On the basis of this reading of the Qur'an, Kugle asserts that homosexuality is "caused by divine will", so "homosexuals have no rational choice in their internal disposition to be attracted to same-sex mates." Kugle argues that if the classical commentators had seen "sexual orientation as an integral aspect of human personality", they would have read the narrative of Lot and his tribe "as addressing male rape of men in particular" and not as "addressing homosexuality in general". Kugle furthermore reads the Qur'an as holding "a positive assessment of diversity". Under this reading, Islam can be described as "a religion that positively assesses diversity in creation and in human societies", allowing gay and lesbian Muslims to view homosexuality as representing the "natural diversity in sexuality in human societies." A critique of Kugle's approach, interpretations and conclusions was published in 2016 by Mobeen Vaid. In 2018, Junaid Jahangir and Hussein Abdullatif published their own critique of Vaid's criticisms against Kugle.

=== Secularism ===
The definition and application of secularism, especially the place of religion in society, vary among Muslim countries as it does among non-Muslim countries. As the concept of secularism varies among secularists in the Muslim world, reactions of Muslim intellectuals to the pressure of secularization also varies. On the one hand, secularism is condemned by some Muslim intellectuals who do not feel that religious influence should be removed from the public sphere. On the other hand, secularism is claimed by others to be compatible with Islam. For example, the quest for secularism has inspired some Muslim scholars who argue that secular government is the best way to observe sharia; "enforcing [sharia] through coercive power of the state negates its religious nature, because Muslims would be observing the law of the state and not freely performing their religious obligation as Muslims" says Abdullahi Ahmed An-Na'im, a professor of law at Emory University and author of Islam and the secular state: negotiating the future of Shariʻa. Moreover, some scholars argue that secular states have existed in the Muslim world since the Middle Ages.

=== Egalitarianism ===
The place of equality versus hierarchy in Islam is sometimes disputed, with Progressive Islam coming down on the side of equity and equality.

Progressive Islam emphasizes what is sometimes called the "decidedly egalitarian spirit" (Judith Miller) of Islam, and how it is "in principle egalitarian, recognizing no superiority of one believer over another by birth or descent, race or nationality, or social status" (Bernard Lewis).

At the same time, Muslims known as Sayyids (those accepted as descendants of the Islamic prophet Muhammad) traditionally have special privileges in Islam, notably of tax exemptions and a share in Khums. A number of scholars (quoted in a number of fatwa sites) have also encouraged discrimination in regards to intermarriage between persons of Arab and non-Arab lineages (Darul Ifta Birmingham (Hanafi fiqh) quoting Raddul Muhtar, (Note: According to Darul Ifta Birmingham (Hanafi fiqh) quoting Raddul Muhtar: 'An Ajmi (non-Arab) cannot be a match for a woman of Arab descent, no matter that he be an Aalim (religious scholar) or even a Sultan (ruling authority).'; The Jurists have stated that among Arabs, a non-Quraishi male is not a match (Kuf) for a Quraishi woman, nor can any person of non-Arab descent be a match for a woman of Arab descent. For example, the Sayyids, whether Siddique or Farooque, Uthmaani or Alawi, or belonging to some other branch, can never be matched by any person not sharing their lineage, no matter his profession and family status. The Sayyids are suitable matches for one another, since they share descent from the Quraishi tribe. Thus, marriages between themselves are correct and permitted without any condition, as appearing in Durrul Mukhtar: "And Kafaah in lineage. Thus, the Quraysh are suitable matches for one another as are the (other) Arabs suitable matches for one another." The ruling relevant to non-Arabs is as follows: ‘An Ajmi (non-Arab) cannot be a match for a woman of Arab descent, no matter that he be an Aalim (religious scholar) or even a Sultan (ruling authority).) and Islamic Virtues website quoting the Shafi’i manual Reliance of the Traveller ...) (Note: The website Islamic Virtues quotes the Shafi’i manual Reliance of the Traveller and Tools of the Worshipper: 'And the ajami (non-Arab) is not suitable for an Arab woman', ... " (the quote goes on to discourage marriages between Muslims of different tribes).; "the classic Shafi’i manual of Islamic law titled ‘Umdat as-Salik wa ‘Uddat an-Nasik (Reliance of the Traveller and Tools of the Worshipper)" "Kafa’a (Suitability in marriage for a female) is in the lineage (ancestry of the man), and in religiousness, and his being a free man (not a slave), and in his profession, and his being free of defects that can cause the annulment of the marriage. And the ajami (non-Arab) is not suitable for an Arab woman, ... " (the quote goes on to forbid marriages between Muslims of different tribes).) Quraishi and non-Quraishi, (Note: Still another site ("Answered according to Shafi'i Fiqh by Qibla.com ... Answered by Shaykh Amjad Rasheed") states: "… most of the scholars do consider this aspect [i.e., lineage] for suitability, therefore a non-Arab is not suitable for an Arab. And a non-Qurayshi is not suitable for a Qurayshi woman …"; Q. I heard that an Arab father has the right to refuse the proposal of a non-Arab to his daughter. How is this in line with the teachings of Islam? How could one, for example, reject a God-fearing man like Bilal, may Allah be well pleased with him?; A. This issue is known as the issue of suitability in marriage. What is meant by this is that a woman and her guardians have the right that she not be married off except to someone that is suitable for her. The scholars have differed in the characteristics that should be considered for suitability, but they have agreed that one of them is religion. This means that a corrupt man is not suitable for a religious woman. They have also differed as to whether lineage should be considered. So, most of the scholars do consider this aspect for suitability, therefore, a non-Arab is not suitable for an Arab. And a non-Qurayshi is not suitable for a Qurayshi woman. This means that if an Arab woman wants to refuse marriage to a non-Arab, she may, and her guardian cannot force her. Also, the guardian can refuse an Arab woman’s marriage to a non-Arab if she wishes. But if an Arab girl is content, as well as he guardian, with marrying a non-Arab, it is perfectly permissible for them to marry and their marriage contract is valid. This is what most of the scholars have decided.) and Sayyid and non-Sayyid, (Note: Can a Sayyed marry a non-Sayyed? Answered as per Hanafi Fiqh by IslamicSolutions.org. Scholar: Shaykh Saeed Ahmed Golaub Answer: In the Name of Allah, the Most Gracious, the Most Merciful. As-salāmu ‘alaykum wa-rahmatullāhi wa-barakātuh. Hadrat Ali Radiallaho Anhu was the cousin of Rasulullah Salallahu Alaihi wa Salam. Hadrat Ali Radiallaho Anhu was married to Hadrat Fatima Radiallaho Anha, who was the daughter of Rasulullah Salallahu Alaihi wa Salam. The progeny of Hadrat Ali Radiallaho Anhu and Hadrat Fatima Radiallaho Anha are called Sayyeds. The progeny of Hadrat Ali Radiallaho Anhu and his other wives are called Alawis.(Bahishti Zewar Vol. 1 Pg. 365.) Shariah emphasizes ensuring that nikah takes place with persons who are compatible with each other in order for a marriage to be successful. Spouses of different backgrounds and incompatible can lead to a breakdown in the marriage. The following are areas of consideration for compatibility in a marriage according to the Hanafi school of thought: (i) Lineage (ii) Deen (iii) piety (iv) wealth (v) occupation (Bahishti Zewar Vol. 1 Pg. 441) [the fatwa goes on to say that the decision is in the hands of the family guardian] A Syed woman cannot marry a non-Syed man, without the consent of the family guardian. If a Syed woman marries a man from a different lineage without the consent of the guardian, the guardian will have the right to annul the marriage if he deems it necessary.) as can be found in a number of fatwa sites.

This is notably in direct contrast to the Prophet Muhammad's last sermon, "...All mankind is from Adam and Eve, an Arab has no superiority over a non-Arab nor a non-Arab has any superiority over an Arab; also a white has no superiority over a black nor a black has any superiority over white except by piety and good action."

== Movements ==
During the 19th and 20th centuries, liberal Muslims increasingly reinterpreted aspects of Islamic thought and practice in response to modern social conditions. This is particularly true of Muslims who now find themselves living in non-Muslim countries.

=== Islamic modernism ===
Islamic modernism, which historically drew on the concept of modernist Salafism, is a movement that has been described as "the first Muslim ideological response" (Note: "Islamic modernism was the first Muslim ideological response to the Western cultural challenge. Started in India and Egypt in the second part of the 19th century ... reflected in the work of a group of like-minded Muslim scholars, featuring a critical reexamination of the classical conceptions and methods of jurisprudence and a formulation of a new approach to Islamic theology and Quranic exegesis. This new approach, which was nothing short of an outright rebellion against Islamic orthodoxy, displayed astonishing compatibility with the ideas of the Enlightenment.") attempting to reconcile Islamic faith with modern Western values such as nationalism, democracy, civil rights, rationality, equality, and progress. It featured a "critical reexamination of the classical conceptions and methods of jurisprudence" and a new approach to Islamic theology and Quranic exegesis (Tafsir).

It was the first of several Islamic movements – including secularism, Islamism and Salafism – that emerged in the middle of the 19th century in reaction to the rapid changes of the time, especially the perceived onslaught of Western Civilization and colonialism on the Muslim world. Founders include Muhammad Abduh (1849–1905), a Sheikh of Al-Azhar University for a brief period before his death in 1905, Jamal ad-Din al-Afghani (1838–1897), and Sir Syed Ahmed Khan (1817–1898).

The early Islamic Modernists (al-Afghani and Muhammad Abdu) used the term "salafiyya" to refer to their attempt at renovation of Islamic thought, and this "salafiyya movement" is often known in the West as "Islamic modernism," although it is very different from what is currently called the Salafi movement, which generally signifies "ideologies such as wahhabism". (Note: "Salafism is, therefore, a modern phenomenon, being the desire of contemporary Muslims to rediscover what they see as the pure, original and authentic Islam, ... However, there is a difference between two profoundly different trends that sought inspiration from the concept of salafiyya. Indeed, between the end of the 19th century and the beginning of the 20th century, intellectuals such as Jamal Edin al-Afghani and Muhammad Abdu used salafiyya to mean a renovation of Islamic thought, with features that would today be described as rationalist, modernist, and even progressive. This Salafiyya movement is often known in the West as 'Islamic modernism.' However, the term salafism is today generally employed to signify ideologies such as Wahhabism, the puritanical ideology of the Kingdom of Saudi Arabia.") Since its inception, Modernism has suffered from co-option of its original reformism by both secularist rulers and by "the official ulama" whose "task it is to legitimise" rulers' actions in religious terms. Modernism differs from secularism in that it insists on the importance of religious faith in public life, and from Salafism or Islamism in that it embraces contemporary European institutions, social processes, and values.

=== Quranism ===
Quranists reject the hadith and follow the Quran only. The extent to which Quranists reject the authenticity of the Sunnah varies, but the more established groups have thoroughly criticised the authenticity of the hadith and refused it for many reasons, the most prevalent being the Quranist claim that hadith is not mentioned in the Quran as a source of Islamic theology and practice, was not recorded in written form until more than two centuries after the death of the Muhammad, and contain perceived internal errors and contradictions. Quranists believe Muhammad himself was a Quranist and the founder of Quranism, and that his followers distorted the faith and split into schisms and factions such as Sunni, Shia, and Khawarij.

=== Scriptural fallibility ===
Some Muslims (Saeed Nasheed, Abdul Karim Soroush, Sayyed Ahmad Al-Qabbanji, Hassan Radwan) have argued for taking "the bold step of challenging the very idea that the Qur’an and Sunna are infallible", and asserting that instead the Qur'an is "divinely inspired but ... human-authored". Saeed Nasheed writes:

"The Qur’an is not the speech of God, just as the loaf of bread is not the work of the farmer. God produced the raw material, which was inspiration, just as the farmer produces the raw material, which is wheat. But it is the baker who turns the wheat or flour into bread according to his own unique way, artistic expertise, and creative ability. Thus it is the Prophet who was responsible for interpreting the inspiration and turning it into actual phrases and words according to his own unique view."

By acknowledging this, Hassan Radwan argues, Muslims will be freed to use their reason to "take what is useful and helpful from religion and ignore what is not."

== Notable organizations ==
=== People's Mujahedin Organization of Iran ===
The People's Mujahedin Organization of Iran (MEK) emerged in the 1960s among Iranian activists who sought to develop a modernist interpretation of Islam that combined Shi'a religious concepts with revolutionary political thought. Its ideological framework differed sharply from the clerical Islam of Ayatollah Khomeini. Central to the organization's thought were notions of social equality and the establishment of a classless society, placing the group within the wider intellectual and political currents of Islamic modernism and revolutionary Islam.

=== Muslims for Progressive Values ===
Muslims for Progressive Values (MPV) is a Progressive Muslim grassroots human rights organization founded by Ani Zonneveld and Pamela K. Taylor in 2007. In December 2013, the United Nations recognized MPV as an official non-government organization (NGO) association member. It has supported women's rights, LGBTQ rights, and interfaith marriage.

For its progressive beliefs, the organization was expelled from the Islamic Society of North America Convention bazaar with it being accused of "promoting ignorance of Islam among Muslims at the event" and "claiming haram was good and virtuous".

=== Sisters in Islam ===
Sisters in Islam (SIS) is a Malaysian registered company committed to promoting the rights of women in Malaysia. Its efforts to promote the rights of Muslim women are based on the principles of equality, justice and freedom enjoined by the Quran. SIS work focuses on challenging laws and policies made in the name of Islam that discriminate against women. As such it tackles issues covered under Malaysia's Islamic family and sharia laws, such as polygamy, child marriage, moral policing, Islamic legal theory and jurisprudence, the hijab and modesty, violence against women and hudud. It is noted for its Islamic feminist research and advocacy.

=== Tolu-e-Islam ===
This organization was initiated by Muhammad Iqbal, and later spearheaded by Ghulam Ahmed Pervez. Ghulam Ahmed Pervez did not reject all hadiths; however, he only accepted hadiths which "are in accordance with the Quran or do not stain the character of the Prophet or his companions." The organization, which does not belong to any political party or to any religious group or sect, publishes and distributes books, pamphlets, and recordings of Pervez's teachings.

== List of notable members ==
=== Scholars ===
- Abu Layth (born 1979) — British Islamic scholar and mufti
- Adnan Ibrahim (born 1966) — Palestinian Islamic scholar
- Amina Wadud (born 1952) — American Islamic scholar and co-founder of Sisters in Islam
- Asma Barlas (born 1950) — Pakistani Islamic scholar
- Asma Lamrabet (born 1961) — Moroccan Islamic scholar
- Edip Yüksel (born 1957) — Kurdish Quranist scholar
- Fazlur Rahman Malik (1919–1988) — Pakistani Islamic scholar and philosopher
- Hassan al-Maliki (born 1970) — Saudi Islamic scholar
- Irfan Habib (born 1931) — Indian Marxist historian
- Javed Ahmad Ghamidi (born 1952) — Pakistani Islamic scholar and philosopher
- Khaled Abou El Fadl (born 1963) — Kuwaiti Islamic scholar and UCLA professor of law
- Laleh Bakhtiar (1938–2020) — Iranian Islamic scholar
- Leila Ahmed (born 1940) — Egyptian Islamic scholar
- Mahmud Shaltut (1893–1963) — Egyptian Islamic scholar and Grand Imam of al-Azhar (1958-1963)
- Mohsen Kadivar (born 1959) — Iranian Islamic scholar and philosopher
- Muhammad Asad (1900–1992) — Pakistani polymath
- Muhammad Shahrur (1938–2019) — Syrian Islamic scholar
- Nasr Abu Zayd (1943–2010) — Egyptian Islamic scholar
- Reza Aslan (born 1972) — American scholar of religious studies
- Riffat Hassan (born 1943) — Pakistani Islamic scholar
- Shabir Ally (born 1953) — Canadian Islamic scholar
- Siti Musdah Mulia (born 1958) — Indonesian Islamic scholar and feminist activist
- Ziba Mir-Hosseini (born 1952) — Iranian legal anthropologist

=== Writers ===
- Bilkisu Yusuf (1952–2015) — Nigerian writer and journalist
- Ed Husain (born 1974) — British writer
- Fatema Mernissi (1940–2015) — Moroccan feminist writer and sociologist
- Hidayet Şefkatli Tuksal (born 1963) — Turkish columnist and activist
- Irshad Manji (born 1968) — Canadian writer and educator
- Mustafa Akyol (born 1972) — Turkish writer and journalist
- Nassima al-Sadah (born 1974) — Saudi writer and activist
- Samina Ali (born 1969) — Indian-American author and activist
- Shahla Sherkat (born 1956) — Iranian feminist author, journalist, and activist
- Shamima Shaikh (1960–1998) — South African feminist journalist and activist
- Zainab Salbi (born 1969) — Iraqi feminist writer and activist

=== Activists ===
- Abdul Ghaffar Khan (1890–1988) — Indian independence activist
- Ani Zonneveld (born 1962) — Malaysian activist and co-founder of Muslims for Progressive Values
- Kadra Yusuf (born 1980) — Norwegian feminist activist
- Linda Sarsour (born 1980) — American feminist activist
- Malala Yousafzai (born 1997) — Pakistani feminist activist
- Manal al-Sharif (born 1979) — Saudi feminist activist
- Samar Badawi (born 1981) — Saudi feminist activist
- Taimur Rahman (born 1975) — Pakistani socialist activist
- Zainah Anwar (born 1955) — Malaysian feminist activist and co-founder of Sisters in Islam

=== Politicians ===
- Ilhan Omar (born 1982) — American congresswoman in the U.S. House of Representatives
- Rashida Tlaib (born 1976) — American congresswoman in the U.S. House of Representatives
- Rania Al Abdullah (born 1970) — Queen consort of Jordan
- Salman Taseer (1944–2011) — Pakistani Governor of Punjab (2008–2011)
- Zille Huma Usman (1971–2007) — Pakistani provincial minister for social welfare in Punjab (2006–2007)
- Zohran Mamdani (born 1991) — Mayor of New York City
- Sadiq Khan (born 1970) - Mayor of London

== See also ==
- Islamo-leftism
- Progressive Muslim vote

=== General links ===
- Glossary of Islam
- Outline of Islam
- Index of Islam-related articles
- Cultural Muslim
- Islam and modernity
- Islam and secularism
- Islamic revival
- Jaringan Islam Liberal
- Modern Islamic philosophy
- Multiculturalism and Islam
- Muslims for Progressive Values
- Nahdlatul Ulama
- Post-Islamism
- Ideology of Mahmoud Mohammed Taha
- Sectarian violence among Muslims
- Unitarian Universalism

=== Terms ===
- Islah
- Akhbari
- Mu'tazilism

== Bibliography ==
- Abrahamian, Ervand (1982). Iran Between Two Revolutions. Princeton, NJ: Princeton University Press. ISBN 9780691053424. OCLC 7975938.
- Bohdan, Siarhei (Summer 2020). "'They Were Going Together with the Ikhwan': The Influence of Muslim Brotherhood Thinkers on Shi'i Islamists during the Cold War". The Middle East Journal. 74 (2): 243–262. doi:10.3751/74.2.14. ISSN 1940-3461. S2CID 225510058.
- Nasr, Vali (2006). The Shia Revival. Norton.
- Chamieh, Jebran (1977). Traditionalists, Militants and Liberal in Present Islam. Research and Publishing House.
- Devji, Faisal; Kazmi, Zaheer, eds. (2017). Islam after Liberalism. Oxford University Press.
- Kepel, Gilles (2002). Jihad: The Trail of Political Islam. Harvard University Press. ISBN 978-0674010901.
- Rahnema, Ali (2000). An Islamic Utopian - A Political Biography of Ali Shari'ati. London, NY: I.B. Tauris. ISBN 1860645526.
- Safi, Omid, ed. (2003). Progressive Muslims: on justice, gender and pluralism. Oxford: Oneworld Publications. ISBN 9781851683161. OCLC 52380025.
