= Islamic feminism =

Islamic feminism is a form of feminism concerned with the role of women in Islam. It aims for the full equality of all Muslims, regardless of gender, in public and private life. Islamic feminists advocate for women's rights, gender equality, and social justice grounded in an Islamic framework. Although rooted in Islam, the movement's pioneers have also utilized secular, Western, or otherwise non-Muslim feminist discourses, and have recognized the role of Islamic feminism as part of an integrated global feminist movement.

Advocates of the movement seek to highlight the teachings of equality in the religion, and encourage a questioning of patriarchal interpretations of Islam by reinterpreting the Quran and Hadith.

Prominent thinkers include Begum Rokeya, Amina Wadud, Leila Ahmed, Fatema Mernissi, Azizah al-Hibri, Riffat Hassan, Asma Lamrabet, and Asma Barlas.

== Definition and background ==
=== Islamic feminists ===
Since the mid-nineteenth century, Muslim women and men have been critical of restrictions placed on women regarding education, seclusion, veiling, polygyny, slavery, and concubinage. Modern Muslims have questioned these practices and advocated for reform. There is an ongoing debate about the status of women in Islam. Conservative Islamic feminists use the Quran, the Hadith, and prominent women in Muslim history as evidence for the discussion on women's rights. Feminists argue that early Islam represented more egalitarian ideals, while conservatives argue that gender asymmetries are "divinely ordained".

Islamic feminists are Muslims who interpret the Quran and Hadith in an egalitarian manner and advocate for women's rights and equality in the public and personal sphere. Islamic feminists critique patriarchal, sexist, and misogynistic understandings of Islam. Islamic feminists understand the Qur'an as advocating gender equality. Islamic feminism is anchored within the discourse of Islam with the Quran as its central text. The historian Margot Badran states that Islamic feminism "derives its understanding and mandate from the Qur’an, seeks rights and justice for women, and for men, in the totality of their existence."

Islamists are advocates of political Islam, the notion that the Quran and hadith mandate an Islamic government. Some Islamists advocate women's rights in the public sphere but do not challenge gender inequality in the personal, private sphere. Su'ad al-Fatih al-Badawi, a Sudanese academic and Islamist politician, has argued that feminism is incompatible with taqwa (the Islamic conception of piety), and thus Islam and feminism are mutually exclusive. Badran argues that Islam and feminism are not mutually exclusive.

Islamic feminists have differed in their understandings and definitions of Islamic feminism. Islamic scholar Asma Barlas shares Badran's views, discussing the difference between secular feminists and Islamic feminism and in countries where Muslims make up 98% of the population, it is not possible to avoid engaging “its basic beliefs.” The major distinction between the two facets of the gender based hypothesis is the fact that Islamic feminism engages with the theology and draws from the qur’anic verses of equality. This postulate is often misinterpreted and confused with the term fundamentalism by the west; which it is also battling at the same time. Fundamentalism can be explained as active contemporary movements organised in order to shield a perceived assault on the religious foundation of the social order. It is fuelled with the basic assumption stating that modernism and secularism is to blame for society's moral degeneration. It stands as, “a protest against the assault on patriarchal structural principles”.

Elizabeth Segran states that just talking about human rights mentioned in the Convention on the Elimination of All Forms of Discrimination Against Women (CEDAW) does not create immediate resonance with ordinary Muslim women; since Islam is the source of their values, integrating human rights frameworks with Islam makes sense.

South African Muslim scholar Fatima Seedat agrees with both Barlas and Badran about the importance of feminism in the Islamic world. However, she debates the term “Islamic Feminism” is unnecessary since feminism is a “social practice, not merely of personal identity.” Seedat believes the convergence of both Islamic and feminism creates more conflict and opens more doors for “Islamists” to interpret or misinterpret the Qur'an to suit their political needs. She believes it is important to speak about and illustrate how feminism has existed in the lines of the Qur'an. By separating the two and giving their own space, it will be more inclusive to everyone (men, women, Muslims and non-Muslims). In the same article, “Feminism, and Islamic Feminism: Between Inadequacy and Inevitability,” Seedat explains that the existence of such a term separates Muslims and isolates them from the rest of the world and the universal feminist movement. She states in her essay the importance of sharing with the rest of the world what Islam has to offer feminism, and to show the true image of Islam by not referring to themselves as Islamic feminists.

Some Muslim women writers and activists have eschewed identifying themselves as Islamic feminists out of a belief Western feminism is exclusionary to Muslim women and women of color more generally. Azizah al-Hibri, a Lebanese-American Muslim scholar, has identified herself as a "womanist".

=== Islamic feminism and the Quran ===
Islamic feminists understand the Quran as advocating gender equality. In the view of feminist legal scholar Azizah al-Hibri, the Quran teaches all human beings are creations of God from one soul, who were divided into nations and tribes to know each other, and the most honored individuals are those who are the most pious. Therefore, al-Hibri writes that the Quran recognizes differences between human beings while asserting their natural equality and no man is recognized as superior by their gender alone.

According to Aysha Hidayatullah, many feminist interpreters of the Quran use the historical context of a verse's revelation in order to determine whether a verse's command was specific to the situation of its revelation or intended as general instruction. For many feminist exegetes, reading the former as the latter risks universalising the historical situation of seventh century Arabia, including the sexism present in that society, as such verses do not directly state the Quran's universal principles but rather apply them to specific situations at the time of revelation. Amina Wadud uses historical contextualisation to critique interpretations of verse 4:34 that take it to assert men's superiority, arguing for a reading that insists on mutuality between men and women. For Wadud, the verse does not assert men's superiority, nor does it universally assign men the role of provider. As cited by Hidayatullah, Wadud understands the verse as prescribing men's responsibility to ensure "that the woman is not burdened with additional responsibilities [in the context of childbearing]." However, the male role of "qiwamah" or economic provider does not always reflect modern social reality. Yet, the verse depicts as ideal an "equitable and mutually dependent relationship" which demonstrates a Quranic insistence on "mutual responsibility between males and females". Such mutual responsibility is not limited to a specific time or place, and can be applied in modern societies.

=== Early Muslims and modern Islamic feminists ===
Modern Muslim feminists and progressive Muslims have taken early figures in Islamic history as role models including Khadijah, Aisha, Hafsa, Umm Salama, Fatima, and Zaynab bint Ali. Zainab Alwani cites Aisha as an empowered and intelligent woman who repeatedly confronted the misogyny of other sahaba. Moroccan feminist Asma Lamrabet has also argued Aisha was an empowered female intellectual against what Lamrabet sees as a misogynistic intellectual history. Lamrabet has also praised Umm Salama as a feminist figure.

Iranian revolutionary thinker Ali Shariati wrote Fatemeh is Fatemeh, a biography of Muhammad's daughter Fatima, that holds her as a role model for women. Ednan Aslan suggests Fatima is an example of female empowerment in early Islam, as she was not afraid to oppose Abu Bakr and demand her inheritance.

Some Muslim feminists have asserted Muhammad himself was a feminist.

== History ==
In the past 150 years or so, many scholarly interpretations have developed from within the Islamic tradition itself that seek to redress social wrongs perpetrated against Muslim women. For example, new Islamic jurisprudence is emerging that seeks to forbid practices like female genital mutilation, equalize family law, support women as clergy and in administrative positions in mosques, and supports equal opportunities for Muslim women to become judges in civil as well as religious institutions. Modern feminist Islamic scholars perceive their work as restoration of rights provided by God and Muhammad but denied by society.

=== Nineteenth century ===
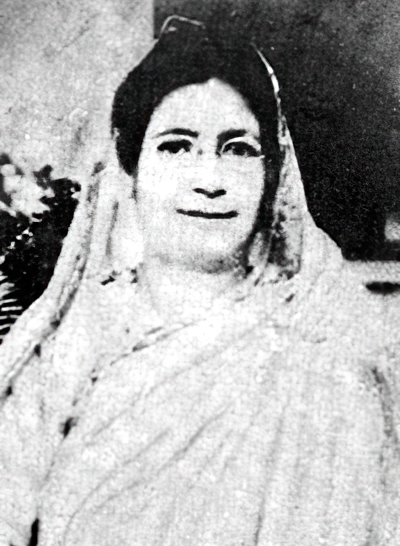
Begum Rokeya was one of the earliest Islamic feminist thinkers.

The modern movement of Islamic feminism began in the nineteenth century.

Rokeya Sakhawat Hossain, also known as Begum Rokeya (1880 - 1932) was a writer, educator and the earliest intellectual of Islamic feminism from Bengal. She struggled women's education and advocated for gender-based equality amongst Bengali Muslims, a community that was socio-economically and culturally deeply marginalised in colonial Bengal. Through her writings and activism, she sharply criticized the entrenched patriarchy of South Asian society and condemned the practice of purdah, the veiling and segregation of women. In works such as Sultana’s Dream (1905), the earliest utopian Islamic feminist science fiction and Abarodhbasini (1931), she imagined alternatives to male-dominated social orders and exposed the injustices faced by women in seclusion. In 1911, she established the first ever girls' school, Sakhawat Memorial Girls’ School in Calcutta to provide formal education for Muslim girls, often persuading conservative families to enroll their daughters by agreeing to preserve cultural customs within the classroom. She was very influential amongst Bengalis and her legacy is celebrated in modern-day Bangladesh.

Aisha Taymur (1840 - 1902) was a prominent writer and early activist for women's rights in Egypt. Taymur's writings criticized male domination over women and celebrated women's intellect and courage.

Another early Muslim feminist activist and writer was Zaynab Fawwaz (1860 - 1914). Fawwaz argued for women's social and intellectual quality with men and wrote a book of biographies of famous women.

Egyptian jurist Qasim Amin, the author of the 1899 pioneering book Women's Liberation (Tahrir al-Mar'a), is often described as the father of the Egyptian feminist movement. In his work, Amin criticized some of the practices prevalent in his society at the time, such as polygyny, the veil, and purdah, i.e. sex segregation in Islam. He condemned them as un-Islamic and contradictory to the true spirit of Islam. His work had an enormous influence on women's political movements throughout the Islamic and Arab world, and is read and cited today.

Despite Qasim Amin's effects on modern-day Islamic feminist movements, present-day scholar Leila Ahmed considers his works both androcentric and colonialist. Muhammad 'Abdu, an Egyptian nationalist and proponent of Islamic modernism, could easily have written the chapters of his work that show honest considerations of the negative effects of the veil on women. Amin even posed many male-centered misconceptions about women, such as their inability to experience love, that women needlessly talk about their husbands outside their presence, and that Muslim marriage is based on ignorance and sensuality, of which women were the chief source.

Lesser known, however, are the women who preceded Amin in their feminist critique of their societies. The women's press in Egypt started voicing such concerns since its very first issues in 1892. Egyptian, Turkish, Iranian, Syrian and Lebanese women and men had been reading European feminist magazines even a decade earlier, and discussed their relevance to the Middle East in the general press.

=== Twentieth century ===
Aisha Abd al-Rahman, writing under her pen name Bint al-Shati ("Daughter of the Riverbank"), was one of the first to undertake Quranic exegesis, and though she did not consider herself to be a feminist, her works reflect feminist themes. She began producing her popular books in 1959, the same year that Naguib Mahfouz published his allegorical and feminist version of the life of Muhammad. She wrote biographies of early women in Islam, including the mother, wives and daughters of Muhammad, as well as literary criticism.

Queen Soraya of Afghanistan played a leading role in reforms that expanded women's access to education and voting rights. The Syrian-born queen, who believed that women should be equal to men, has been described by some as the Muslim world's first feminist. She helped establish a women's magazine and a women's organization to protect girls and women from abuse and domestic violence. She also arranged for young Afghan men and women to take higher education abroad. The liberal reforms were not received kindly by the ultra-conservative Islamists who orchestrated a widespread rebellion in 1928. In order to spare the country and people from the horrors of a long civil war, King Amanullah, and Queen Soraya abdicated and went into exile with their family in 1929 to Rome.

Moroccan writer and sociologist, Fatema Mernissi was a prominent Muslim feminist thinker. Her book Beyond the Veil explores the oppression of women in Islamic societies and sexual ideology and gender identity through the perspective of Moroccan society and culture. Mernissi argued in her book The Veil and the Male Elite that the suppression of women's rights in Islamic societies is the result of political motivation and its consequent manipulative interpretation of hadith, which runs counter to the egalitarian Islamic community of men and women envisioned by Muhammad. Mernissi argued that the ideal Muslim woman being "silent and obedient" has nothing to do with the message of Islam. In her view, conservative Muslim men manipulated the Quran to preserve their patriarchal system in order to prevent women from sexual liberation; thus enforcing justification of strict veiling and limiting their rights.

A later 20th-century Islamic feminist is Amina Wadud. Wadud was born into an African-American family and converted to Islam. In 1992, Wadud published Quran and Woman, a work that critiqued patriarchal interpretations of the Quran.

Some strains of modern Islamic feminism have opted to expunge hadith from their ideology altogether in favor of a movement focusing only on Qur'anic principles. Riffat Hassan has advocated one such movement, articulating a theology wherein what are deemed to be universal rights for humanity outlined in the Qur'an are prioritized over contextual laws and regulations. She has additionally claimed that the Qur'an, taken alone as scripture, does not present females either as a creation preceded by the male or as the instigator of the "Fall of Man". This theological movement has been met with criticism from other Muslim feminists such as Kecia Ali, who has criticized its selective nature for ignoring elements within the Muslim tradition that could prove helpful in establishing more egalitarian norms in Islamic society.

=== Twenty-first century ===
Islamic feminist scholarship and activism has continued into the 21st century.

In 2015, a group of Muslim activists, politicians, and writers issued a Declaration of Reform which, among other things, supports women's rights and states in part, "We support equal rights for women, including equal rights to inheritance, witness, work, mobility, personal law, education, and employment. Men and women have equal rights in mosques, boards, leadership and all spheres of society. We reject sexism and misogyny." The Declaration also announced the founding of the Muslim Reform Movement organization to work against the beliefs of Middle Eastern terror groups. Asra Nomani and others placed the Declaration on the door of the Islamic Center of Washington.

Feminism in the Middle East is over a century old, and having been impacted directly by the war on terror in Afghanistan, continues to grow and fight for women's rights and equality in all conversations of power and everyday life.

Muslim feminist writers today include Aysha Hidayatollah, Kecia Ali, Asma Lamrabet, Olfa Yousef, and Mohja Kahf.

=== Muslim women in politics ===
Muslim majority countries have produced several female heads of state, prime ministers, and state secretaries such as Lala Shovkat of Azerbaijan, Benazir Bhutto of Pakistan, Mame Madior Boye of Senegal, Tansu Çiller of Turkey, Kaqusha Jashari of Kosovo, and Megawati Sukarnoputri of Indonesia. In Bangladesh, Khaleda Zia was elected the country's first female prime minister in 1991, and served as prime minister until 2009, when she was replaced by Sheikh Hasina, who made Bangladesh the country with the longest continuous female premiership (2009–2024), marked by an era of authoritarianism.

== Muslim feminist groups and initiatives ==
=== Revolutionary Association of the Women of Afghanistan ===
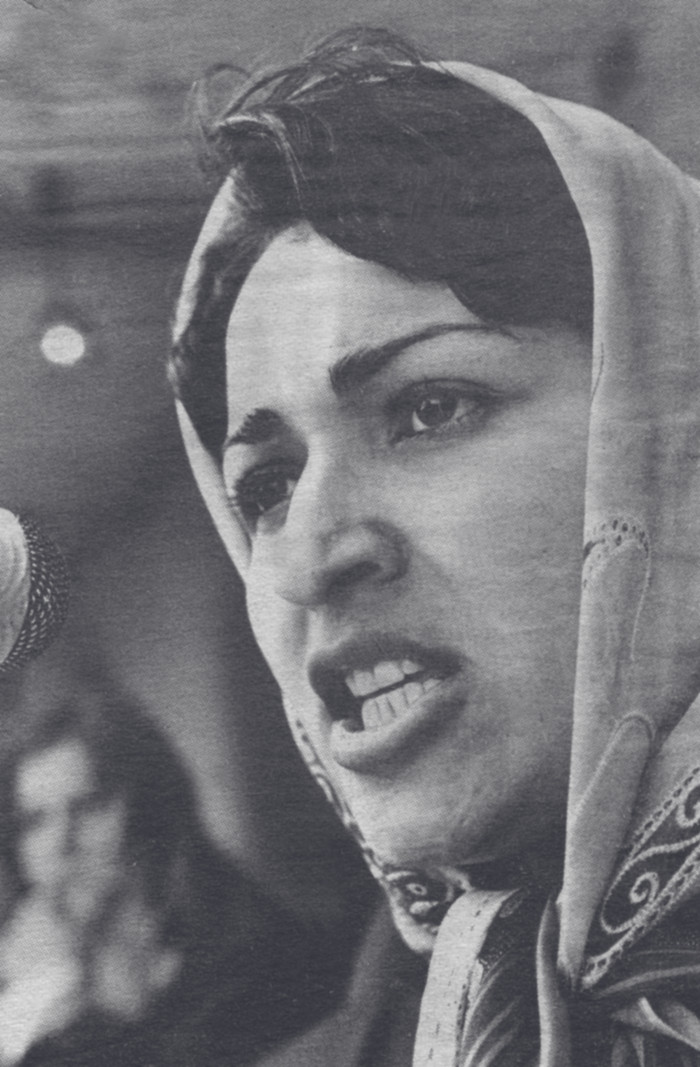
Meena Keshwar Kamal (1956 - 1987), founder of RAWA

The Revolutionary Association of the Women of Afghanistan (RAWA) is a women's organization based in Quetta, Pakistan, that promotes women's rights and secular democracy. The organization aims to involve women of Afghanistan in both political and social activities aimed at acquiring their human rights and continuing the struggle against the government of Afghanistan based on democratic and secular - not fundamentalist - principles, in which women can participate fully.

The organization was founded in 1977 by a group of intellectuals led by Meena (she did not use a last name). They founded the organization to promote equality and education for women; it continues to "give voice to the deprived and silenced women of Afghanistan". Before 1978, RAWA focused mainly on women's rights and democracy, but after the coup of 1978, directed by Moscow, and the 1979 Soviet Occupation of Afghanistan, "Rawa became directly involved in the war of resistance, advocating democracy and secularism from the outset". In 1979 RAWA campaigned against the Democratic Republic of Afghanistan, and organized meetings in schools to mobilize support against it, and in 1981, launched a bilingual feminist magazine, Payam-e-Zan (Women's Message). RAWA also founded Watan Schools to aid refugee children and their mothers, offering both hospitalization and the teaching of practical skills.

=== Sisters in Islam ===
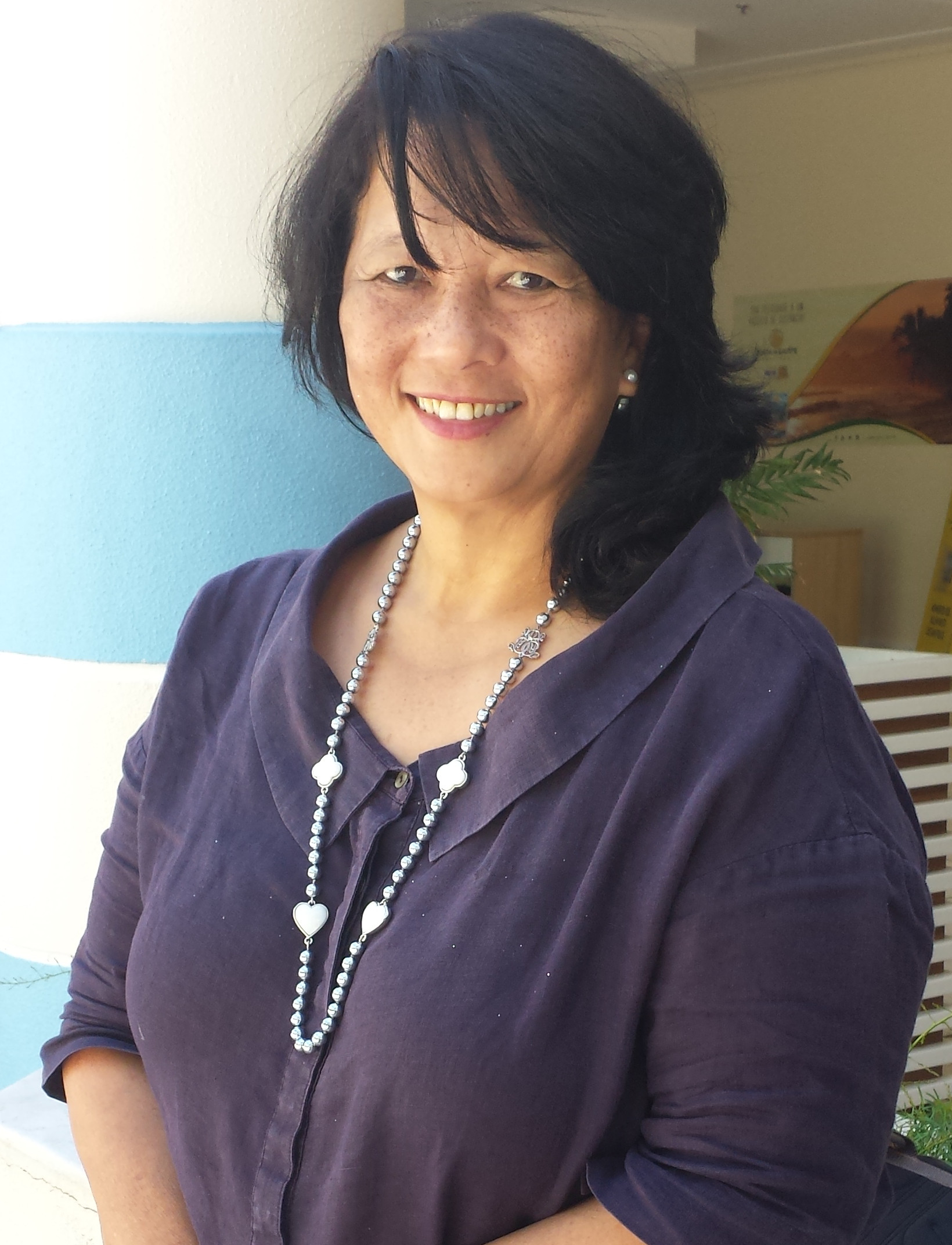
Zainah Anwar

Sisters in Islam (SIS) is a Malaysian civil society organization committed to promoting the rights of women within the frameworks of Islam and universal human rights. SIS work focuses on challenging laws and policies made in the name of Islam that discriminate against women. As such it tackles issues covered under Malaysia's Islamic family and syariah laws, such as polygamy, child marriage, moral policing, Islamic legal theory and jurisprudence, the hijab and modesty, violence against women and hudud. Their mission is to promote the principles of gender equality, justice, freedom, and dignity of Islam and empower women to be advocates for change. They seek to promote a framework of women's rights in Islam which take into consideration women's experiences and realities; they want to eliminate the injustice and discrimination that women may face by changing mindsets that may hold women to be inferior to men; and they want to increase the public knowledge and reform laws and policies within the framework of justice and equality in Islam. Prominent members are Zainah Anwar and co-founder Amina Wadud.

=== Musawah ===
In 2009, twelve women from the Arab world formed the global movement Musawah, whose name means "equality" in Arabic. Musawah advocates for feminist interpretations of Islamic texts and calls on nations to abide by international human rights standards such as those promulgated in the Convention on the Elimination of All Forms of Discrimination Against Women. Musawah's approach is modeled after that of Sisters in Islam. Secular feminists have criticized Musawah, arguing that Islam is shaky ground on which to build a feminist movement, given that interpretation of Islamic sources is subjective.

=== Sister-hood ===
Sister-hood is an international platform for the voices of women of Muslim heritage founded in 2007 by Norwegian film-maker and human rights activist Deeyah Khan through her media and arts production company Fuuse.

Sister-hood was relaunched in 2016 as a global online magazine and live events platform promoting the voices of women of Muslim heritage. Sister-hood magazine ambassadors include Farida Shaheed from Pakistan, Egyptian Mona Eltahawy, Palestinian Rula Jebreal, Leyla Hussein of Somali heritage and Algerian Marieme Helie Lucas.

=== Women Living Under Muslim Laws (WLUML) ===
Women Living Under Muslim Laws is an international solidarity network established in 1984 that advocates for both Muslim and non-Muslim women who live in states governed by Islamic law. The group does research on Islamic law and women and advocacy work.

=== Muslim Women's Quest for Equality ===
Muslim Women's Quest for Equality is an Indian activist group that petitioned the Supreme Court of India against the practices of talaq-e-bidat (triple talaq), nikah halala and polygyny under the Muslim personal laws as being illegal and unconstitutional in September 2016.

=== Ni Putes Ni Soumises ===
Ni Putes Ni Soumises, whose name translates to Neither Whores nor Submissives, is a French feminist organization founded by Samira Bellil and other young women of African backgrounds, to address the sexual and physical violence that women in Muslim majority neighborhoods in France faced.

== International conferences on Islamic feminism ==
Few international conferences on Islamic feminism have taken place. One international congress on Islamic feminism was held in Barcelona, Spain in 2008. Musawah ('equality'; in Arabic: مساواة) is a global movement for equality and justice in the Muslim family, led by feminists since 2009, "seeking to reclaim Islam and the Koran for themselves".

Musawah movement operates on the principle that patriarchy within Muslim countries is a result of the way male interpreters have read Islamic texts, and that feminists can progressively interpret the Quran to achieve the goal of international human rights standards. The first female Muslim 'ulema congress was held in Indonesia in 2017. The women ulema congress issued a fatwa to lift the minimum age for girls to marry to 18. Malaysian feminist Zainah Anwar informed the congress that women have an equal right to define Islam and that women need to fight against male domination in Quranic interpretations. During the congress, Nur Rofiah, a professor in Quranic studies, stated that, Islam asks every human being to elevate the status of humankind, and polygamy does not, and that polygamy is not the teaching of Islam

== Areas of campaign ==
=== Personal law ===
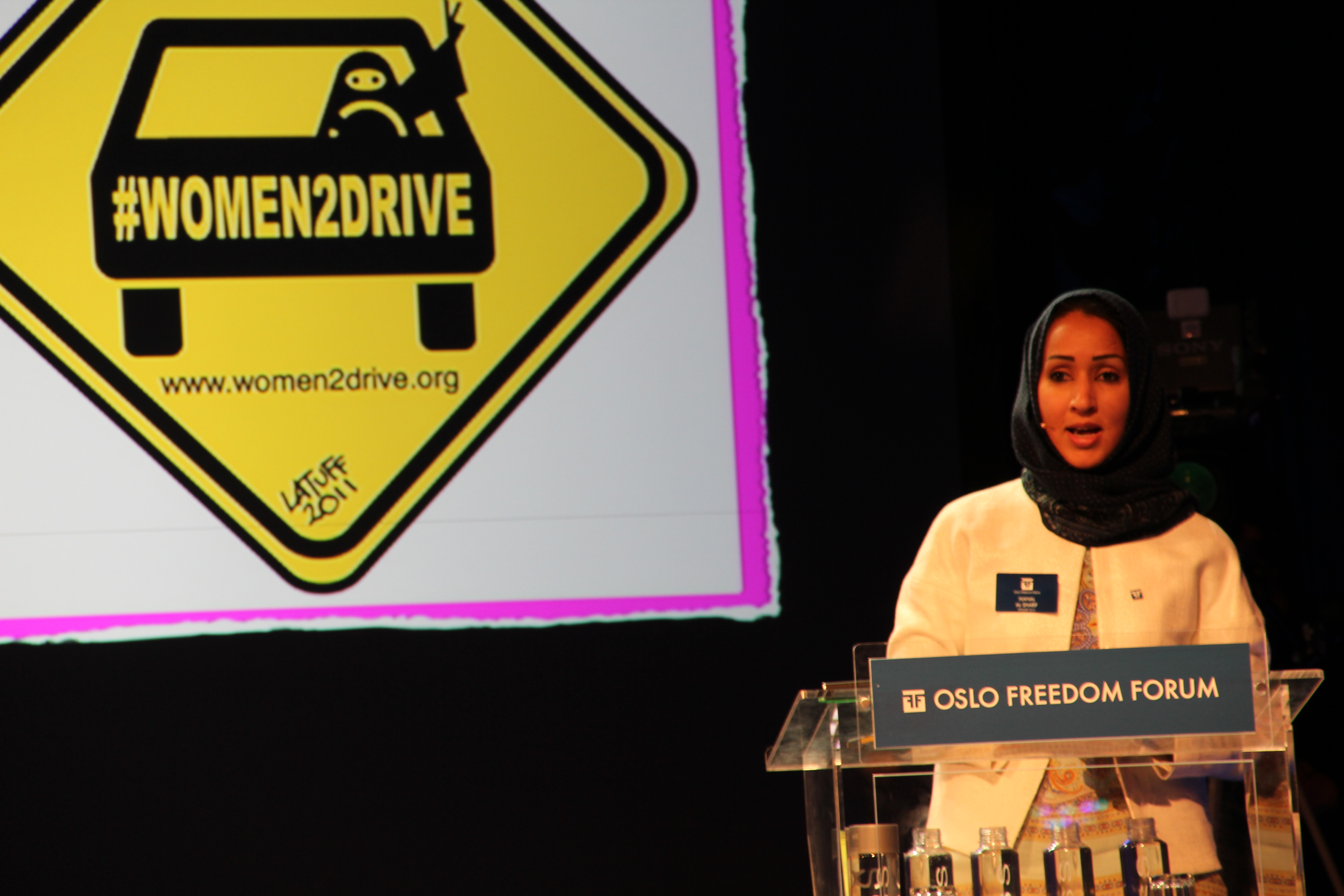
Manal al-Sharif speaking at the Oslo Freedom Forum in 2012 about the #Women2Drive campaign she co-founded.

One of such controversial interpretations involve passages in the Quran that discuss the idea of a man's religious obligation to support women. Some scholars, such as anthropologist Carolyn Fluehr-Lobban in her work on Arab-Muslim women activists' engagement in secular religious movements, argue that this assertion of a religious obligation "has traditionally been used as a rationale for the social practice of male authority." In some countries the legislative and administrative application of male authority is used to justify denying women access to the public sphere through the "denial of permission to travel or work outside the home, or even drive a car." On Sept. 26, 2017 Saudi Arabia announced it would end its longstanding policy banning women from driving in June 2018. Various female activists had protested the ban, among them Saudi women's rights activists Manal al-Sharif, by posting videos of them driving on social media platforms. One of the women's rights activists from Saudi Arabia, Loujain al-Hathloul had been imprisoned for more than 3 years and was sentenced on 28 December 2020 to a total of 5 years and 8 months in prison for allegedly conspiring against the kingdom in alignment with foreign nations following her protest against the ban on driving for women in Saudi. Two years and ten months of her prison sentence was reduced leaving only 3 months of time left to serve. However, the charges against her were false and the authorities denied arresting her for protesting against driving ban on women in Saudi Arabia. The prosecutors who were charged with torturing her during detention; sexually and otherwise, were cleared of charges by the government stating lack of evidence.

Islamic feminists have objected to the MPL legislation in many of these countries, arguing that these pieces of legislation discriminate against women. Some Islamic feminists have taken the attitude that a reformed MPL which is based on the Quran and sunnah, which includes substantial input from Muslim women, and which does not discriminate against women is possible. Such Islamic feminists have been working on developing women-friendly forms of MPL. (See, for example, the Canadian Council of Muslim Women for argument based on the Qur'an and not on what they call medieval male consensus.) Other Islamic feminists, particularly some in Muslim minority contexts which are democratic states, argue that MPL should not be reformed but should be rejected and that Muslim women should seek redress, instead, from the civil laws of those states.

Islamic feminists have been active in advocating for women's rights in the Islamic world. In 2012, Jordanian women protested against laws that allowed the dropping of charges if a rapist marries his victim, Tunisian women marched for equality for women in a new constitution, Saudi women protested against the ban against car driving, and Sudanese women created a silent wall of protest demanding freedom for arrested women.

=== Equality in the mosque ===
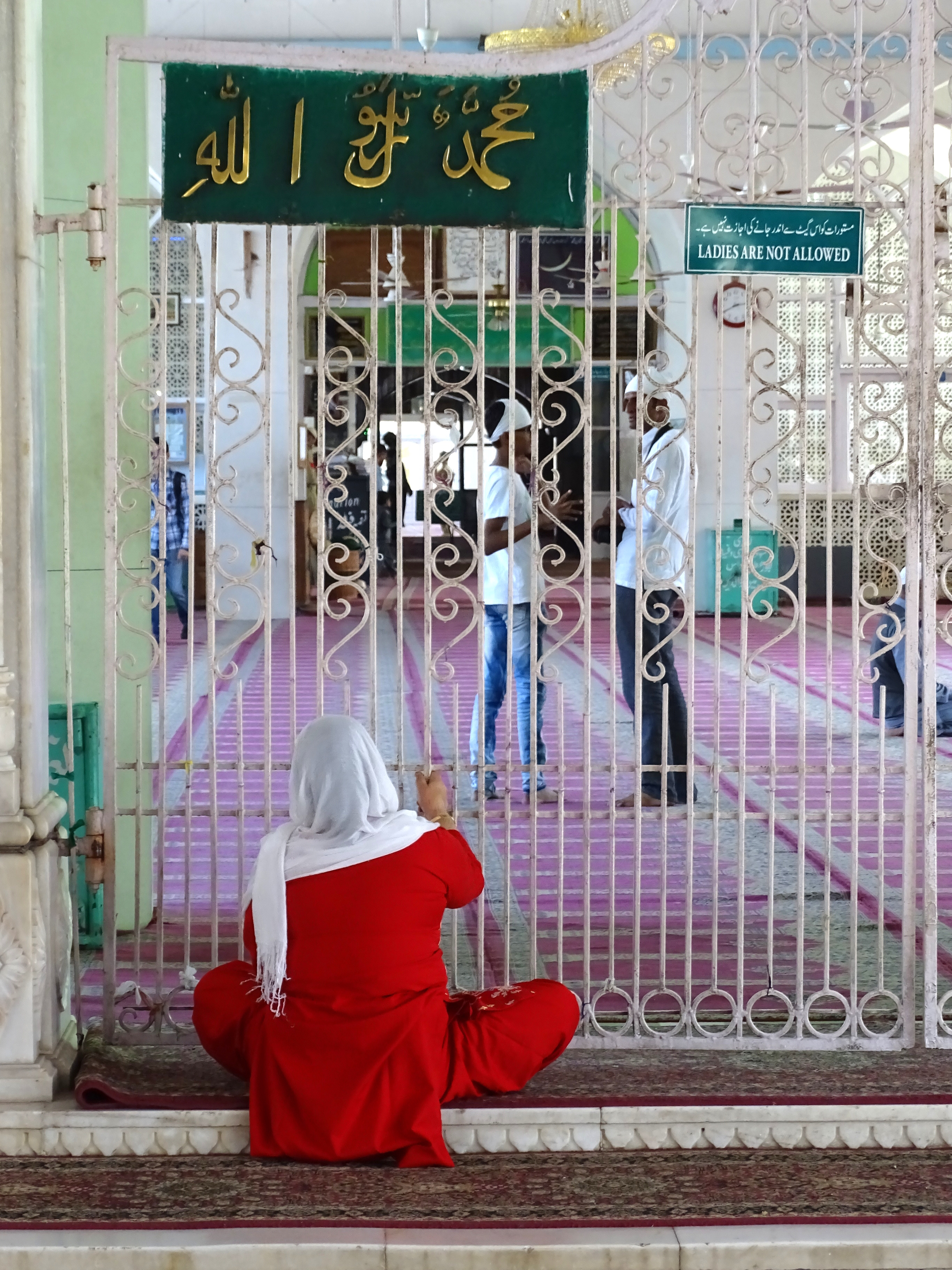
Woman sitting at the threshold of the main building of Hazratbal shrine in Srinagar as the sign on the gate reads "Ladies Are Not Allowed"

A survey by the Council on American Islamic Relations showed that two out of three mosques in 2000 required women to pray in a separate area, up from one out of two in 1994. Islamic feminists have begun to protest this, advocating for women to be allowed to pray beside men without a partition, as they do in Mecca. In 2003, Asra Nomani challenged the rules at her mosque in Morgantown, West Virginia, that required women to enter through a back door and pray in a secluded balcony. She argued that Muhammad didn't put women behind partitions, and that barriers preventing women from praying equally with men are just sexist man-made rules. The men at her mosque put her on trial to be banished.

In 2004, some American mosques had constitutions prohibiting women from voting in board elections. In 2005, following public agitation on the issue, Muslim organizations that included the CAIR and the Islamic Society of North America issued a report on making mosques "women-friendly", to assert women's rights in mosques, and to include women's right to pray in the main hall without a partition.

In 2010, American Muslim Fatima Thompson and a few others organized and participated in a "pray-in" at the Islamic Center of Washington in D.C. Police were summoned and threatened to arrest the women when they refused to leave the main prayer hall. The women continued their protest against being corralled in what they referred to as the "penalty box" (a prayer space reserved for only women). Thompson called the penalty box "an overheated, dark back room." A second protest also staged by the same group on the eve of International Women's Day in 2010 resulted in calls to the police and threats of arrest again. However, the women were not arrested on either occasion. In May 2010, five women prayed with men at the Dar al-Hijrah mosque, one of the Washington region's largest Islamic centers. After the prayers, a member of the mosque called Fairfax police who asked the women to leave. However, later in 2010, it was decided that D.C. police would no longer intervene in such protests.

In 2015 a group of Muslim activists, politicians, and writers issued a Declaration of Reform which states in part, "Men and women have equal rights in mosques, boards, leadership and all spheres of society. We reject sexism and misogyny." That same year Asra Nomani and others placed the Declaration on the door of the Islamic Center of Washington.

=== Equality in leading prayer ===
In 'A Survey and Analysis of Legal Arguments on Woman-Led Prayer in Islam named "I am one of the People"' Ahmed Elewa states that not because of external expectation but in due course with enlightened awareness Muslim communities should adopt women lead mixed gender prayers. In the same research paper Silvers emphasizes on example of Umm Salama who insisted that women are 'one of the people' and suggests women to assert their inclusion with equal rights. Elewa and Silvers research calls contemporary prohibitions of women lead prayer frustrating.

According to currently existing traditional schools of Islam, a woman cannot lead a mixed gender congregation in salat (prayer). Traditionalists like Muzammil Siddiqi states that women are not supposed to lead prayer because "It is not permissible to introduce any new style or liturgy in Salat." In other words, there must be no deviation from the tradition of men teaching. Some schools make exceptions for Tarawih (optional Ramadan prayers) or for a congregation consisting only of close relatives. Certain medieval scholars—including Muhammad ibn Jarir al-Tabari (838–923), Abu Thawr (764–854), Isma'il Ibn Yahya al-Muzani (791–878), and Ibn Arabi (1165–1240) considered the practice permissible at least for optional (nafl) prayers; however, their views are not accepted by any major surviving group. Islamic feminists have begun to protest this.

On March 18, 2005, Amina Wadud led a mixed-gender congregational Friday prayer in New York City. It sparked a controversy within the Muslim community because the imam was a woman, Wadud, who also delivered the khutbah. Moreover, the congregation she addressed was not separated by gender. This event that departed from the established ritual practice became an embodied performance of gender justice in the eyes of its organizers and participants. The event was widely publicized in the global media and caused an equally global debate among Muslims. However, many Muslims, including women, remain in disagreement with the idea of a woman as imam. Muzammil Siddiqi, chairman of the Fiqh Council of North America, argued that prayer leadership should remain restricted to men. He based his argument on the longstanding practice and thus community consensus and emphasized the danger of women distracting men during prayers.

The events that occurred in regards to equality in the mosque and women leading prayers, show the enmity Muslim feminists may receive when voicing opposition toward sexism and establishing efforts to combat it. Those who criticize Muslim feminists state that those who question the faith's views on gender segregation, or who attempt to make changes, are overstepping their boundaries and are acting offensively. On the other hand, people have stated that Islam does not advocate gender segregation. Britain's influential Sunni imam, Ahtsham Ali, has stated, "gender segregation has no basis in Islamic law" nor is it justified in the Quran. Elewa and Silvers deduce that with lack of any explicit evidence to contrary one ought to assume, women lead prayer adds nothing new to God established worship but just a default state of command expects men and women both to lead the prayer.

=== Internet & social media impact ===
Internet & social media debates opened up easy access to religious texts for Muslim women which helps them understand scriptural backing for the gender equality rights they which they fight for.

=== Dress code ===
Another issue that concerns Muslim women is dress code. Islam requires both men and women to dress modestly, but there is a difference in opinion about what type of dress is required. according to Leila Ahmed, during Muhammad's lifetime, the veil was observed only by his wives; its spread to the wider Muslim community was a later development.

Islamic feminist Asma Barlas says that the Quran only requires women to dress modestly, but it doesn't require them to veil.

Despite the controversy over hijab in sections of Western society, the veil is not controversial in mainstream Islamic feminist discourse, except in those situations where it is the result of social pressure or coercion. There is in fact strong support from many Muslim feminists in favor of the veil, though they generally believe that it should be voluntarily chosen.

Many Muslim men and women now view the veil as a symbol of Islamic freedom. While there are some Islamic scholars who interpret Islamic scripture as not mandating hijab, many Islamic feminists still observe hijab as an act of religious piety or sometimes as a way of symbolically rejecting Western culture by making a display of their Muslim identity. Such sentiment was expressed, among others, by Muslim U.S. Congresswoman Ilhan Omar who stated in an interview with Vogue, "To me, the hijab means power, liberation, beauty, and resistance." The annual event World Hijab Day, observed on February 1 (the anniversary of the Ayatollah Ruhollah Khomeini's return from exile to Iran), is also celebrated by many Islamic feminists. Meanwhile, publicist Nadiya Takolia stated that she had actually adopted hijab after becoming a feminist, saying the hijab "is not about protection from men's lusts," but about "telling the world that my femininity is not available for public consumption...and I don't want to be part of a system that reduces and demeans women."

On the other side, there is a section of Islamic feminists, such as Fadela Amara and Hedi Mhenni, who do oppose hijab and even support legal bans on the garment for various reasons. Amara explained her support for France's ban of the garment in public buildings: "The veil is the visible symbol of the subjugation of women, and therefore has no place in the mixed, secular spaces of France's public school system." When some feminists began defending the headscarf on the grounds of "tradition", Amara said: "It's not tradition, it's archaic! French feminists are totally contradictory. When Algerian women fought against wearing the headscarf in Algeria, French feminists supported them. But when it's some young girl in a French suburb school, they don't. They define liberty and equality according to what colour your skin is. It's nothing more than neocolonialism." Mhenni also expressed support for Tunisia's ban on the veil: "If today we accept the headscarf, tomorrow we'll accept that women's rights to work and vote and receive an education be banned and they'll be seen as just a tool for reproduction and housework."

Sihem Habchi, director of Ni Putes Ni Soumises, expressed support for France's ban on the burqa in public places, stating that the ban was a matter of 'democratic principle' and protecting French women from the 'obscurantist, fascist, right-wing movement' that she claims the burqa represents.

Masih Alinejad began the movement My Stealthy Freedom in protest of forced hijab policies in Iran. The movement began as a Facebook page where women uploaded pictures of themselves defying Iran's mandatory hijab laws. Mahmoud Arghavan, however, noted that Islamic feminists have criticized My Stealthy Freedom as supporting Islamophobia, though Alinejad has countered this criticism.

== Criticism ==
"Islamic feminism" as a concept has been heavily scrutinized and criticized by both Muslim and non-Muslim feminists. Iranian feminist Mahnaz Afkhami, for example, stated the following about secular Muslim feminists like herself:

Our difference with Islamic feminists is that we don't try to fit feminism in the Qur'an. We say that women have certain inalienable rights. The epistemology of Islam is contrary to women's right ... I call myself a Muslim and a feminist. I am not an Islamic feminist – that’s a contradiction in terms.

Hakimeh Entesari, an Iranian academic, also said, "The thoughts and writings of these people [Islamic feminists] suffer from a fundamental problem, and that is the absolute detachment of this movement from the cultural and indigenous realities of Islamic societies and countries..." She also believes that the use of the term "Islamic feminism" is wrong and it should be "Muslim feminists".

Maria Massi Dakake, an American Muslim academic, criticized Asma Barlas' assertion the Quran is inherently anti-patriarchal and sought to undo patriarchal social structures. Dakake writes, "She [Asma Barlas] makes a number of important and substantial points about the limitations to traditional "patriarchal" rights of fathers and husbands in the Quran. However, the conclusion that the Qur'an is "anti-patriarchal" as such is hard to reconcile with the Quran's fairly explicit endorsement of male leadership - even if not absolute authority - over the marital unit in 4:34."

Ibtissam Bouachrine, a professor at Smith College, has critiqued the writings of Fatema Mernissi. According to Bouachrine, Mernissi, in her book, The Veil and the Male Elite, critiques male interpretations of Quran 33:53, but not of Quran 24:31, "which evokes the veil in the context of the feminine body in public space." She also criticizes how Mernissi focuses on the hadith over the Quran because it is easier to criticize the hadith than the Quran which is seen as the word of God, but the hadith are the words of human beings. Bouachrine also critiques how Mernissi presents Muhammad as a "revolutionary heretic who sides with women against the Arabian male elite and their patriarchal values" but does not critique Muhammad's marriage to nine-year-old Aisha. Bouachrine also states that Mernissi does not mention that Zaynab was the former wife of Muhammad's adopted son.

Bouachrine also critiques Amina Wadud's interpretation of 4:34 in Quran and Woman. According to Bouachrine, although 4:34 seems to call for men to physically discipline their wives, "Wadud argues that the Qur’an would not encourage violence against women and therefore the obedience required of women is to God not to the husband." Wadud also proposes that daraba means to set an example instead of to use physical force. According to Bouachrine, these reinterpretations do not help women in the Muslim world suffering from domestic violence.

On a slightly different note, Ahmadian, head of Isfahan Institute of Theology stated:

Some have created a fake title which is called "Islamic Feminism" in order to solve the conflict between Islam and feminism, that is considered to be a paradoxical combination and its principles are not consistent with the principles of Islam religion. Based on Islamic teachings, there are differences between the roles and positions of men/women, and this distinction doesn't lower the dignity of women in any way.

While Seyed Hussein Ishaghi, Ph.D. in Islamic Theology, had the following to say:

It is more appropriate to call Islamic feminism a woman-oriented interpretation of Islam religion... A group in the interaction of Islamic and Western culture faced an identity crisis; and on the other hand, in this confrontation, a group with its heart attached to Western culture denied religious teachings. That group promoted materialistic viewpoints by considering the mentioned beliefs as class or superstitious."

== World Hijab Day ==
World Hijab Day is an annual event founded by Bangladeshi-American Nazma Khan in 2013, taking place on 1 February each year in 140 countries worldwide. Its stated purpose is to encourage women of all religions and backgrounds to wear and experience the hijab for a day and to educate and spread awareness on why hijab is worn.

== See also ==
=== In particular countries ===
- Akhbari
- Feminism in Egypt
- Feminism in India
- Golden Needle Sewing School
- International Conference on Population and Development
- Revolutionary Association of the Women of Afghanistan
- Women in Lebanon
- Women's rights in Iran
- Women's rights in Saudi Arabia
- Women's rights in Kuwait
- Women's rights movement in Iran

=== General ===
- Gendered Islamophobia
- Hermeneutics of feminism in Islam
- List of Muslim feminists
- Abortion and Islam
- LGBT in Islam
- Female figures in the Qur'an
- Feminationalism
- Gender segregation and Islam
- History of feminism
- Postcolonial feminism
- Purplewashing
- Rada (fiqh)
- Rights and obligations of spouses in Islam
- Role of women in religion
- Sex segregation in Iran
- Taliban treatment of women
- Women in Islam
- World Hijab Day
- Glossary of Islam
- Gender roles in Islam
- Islamic clothing
