= Amina Wadud =

American Islamic scholar (born 1952)

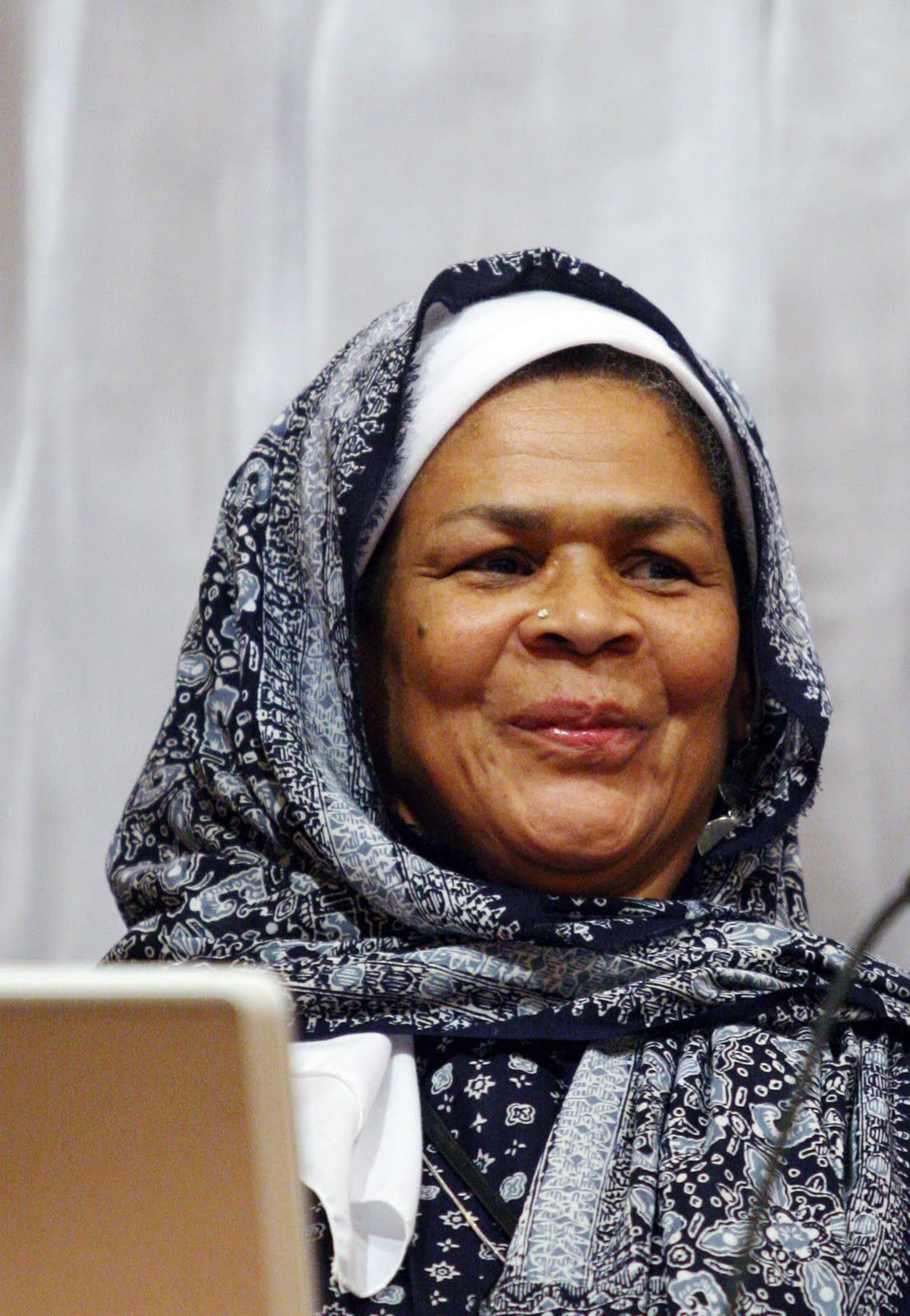
- Born: September 25, 1952 (age 74); Bethesda, Maryland, U.S.

Education
- Education: University of Pennsylvania, University of Michigan, American University in Cairo, Cairo University, Al-Azhar University

Philosophical work
- Era: 21st-century philosophy
- Institutions: International Islamic University Malaysia, Starr King School for the Ministry
- Main interests: Islamic studies, Islamic feminism, theology, philosophy, interfaith dialogue
- Notable ideas: Women as imams

Amina Wadud (born Mary Teasley, September 25, 1952) is an American Muslim theologian. Wadud Wadud served from Assistant Professor to Associate and then Full (1992-2007) at Virginia Commonwealth University before taking early retirement. She has served as visiting professor at the Indonesian Consortium for Religious Studies Gadja Madha University (2020-2024). At the same time she was a visiting professor at UIN Sunan Kalijaga. whie maintaining as visiting scholar at Starr King School for the Ministry (2006-2024). Wadud has written extensively on the notion of gender, including the role of women in Islam.

Born and raised as a Methodist in Bethesda, Maryland, Wadud converted to Islam in 1972 while studying at the University of Pennsylvania. She went on to study Arabic and Islamic studies, first in the United States and later in Egypt. Wadud made international headlines in 2005 when she led Friday prayers at a mixed congregation in New York, stirring controversy in some spheres of the Islamic world. Wadud continued to lead prayers at various congregations around the world until she retired from public life in 2025.

== Early life ==
Wadud was born Mary Teasley in Bethesda, Maryland. Her father was a Methodist minister. He introduced her to the God of love and justice. She has said “I have never known a God without Love and Justice. equality.[3] With her father she attended the March on Washington with the Rev. Dr. Martin Luther King in 1963. It was her first encounter with religion as motivation for justice and equality.

In 1972, she converted to Islam, while a student at the University of Pennsylvania, which she attended from 1970 to 1975. She legally changed her name along with her then husband. She would undergo more legal name changes until she eventually retained 'amina wadud' as her name, which she chose to spell without capital letters according to the original Arabic.[3]

== Education ==
In 1975, Wadud graduated from the University of Pennsylvania with a Bachelor of Science in Elementary Education and became a certified teacher. Then she moved to El-Beida, Libya for two years where she taught English at the University el-Beida.

She received her M.A. in Near Eastern Studies followed by her Ph.D. in Arabic and Islamic Studies from the University of Michigan in 1988. During graduate school, she studied in Egypt, including advanced Arabic at the Center for Arabic Studies Abroad program for advanced Arabic at the American University in Cairo, Qur'anic studies and tafsir (exegesis or religious interpretation) at Cairo University, and philosophy at Al-Azhar University.

== Work ==
Wadud's research focus has been on Qur’an, Qur'anic studies, tafsir, hermeneutics, gender and sexuality and the theology of Tawhid.

From 1989 to 1992, she worked as an assistant professor in faculty of Revealed Knowledge at International Islamic University, Kuala Lumpur, Malaysia for a three-year contract. While there, she published an edited volume of her dissertation Qur'an and Woman: Rereading the Sacred Text from a Woman's Perspective. That first publication was followed by an expanded edition from Oxford University Press in 1999 with the additional subtitle: Rereading the Sacred Text from a Woman's Perspective. The first book has been used extensively in the modern academic study of Islam, Muslim women and Qur’anic Studies in all parts of the world. In 2006 she published her second monograph, Inside the Gender Jihad: Women's Reform in Islam by One World Publications. Most recently, in 2022, she has published a spiritual memoir called Once in a Lifetime from Kantara Press. This book provides and introduction to the five pillars of Islam from a progressive perspective.

While in Malaysia she joined 7 other women as founders of the non-governmental organization Sisters in Islam. SIS would spear head the creation of an international advocacy group called Musawah in 2009.

After retirement in 2006 she took up a position as a visiting professor at Starr King School for the Ministry in California. She traveled to Indonesia in 2008 where she took up a visiting professor position at the Center for Religious and Cross Cultural Studies at Gadjah Mada University in Yogyakarta, Indonesia in 2009. Wadud would return to Yogyakarta in 2020 to hold visiting professor positions at the National Islamic University Sunan Kalijaga, and at the International Consortium of Religious Studies, at Gadjah Mada University. She has held visiting positions at Harvard Divinity School, Melbourne University and other universities. She has given hundreds of lectures, workshops and presentations in grassroots, government, non-government and academic forums throughout the United States, the Middle East, South and Southeast Asia, Africa, Australia and Europe.

Her speaking engagements include the keynote address "Islam, Justice, and Gender" at the 2008 international conferenceUnderstanding Conflicts: Cross-Cultural Perspectives, held at Aarhus University, Denmark; a paper titled “Islam Beyond Patriarchy Through Gender Inclusive Qur’anic Analysis” at the 2009 Musawah - Equality and Justice in the Family conference; the Regional Conference on Advancing Gender Equality and Women's Empowerment in Muslim Societies, hosted by United Nations Development Fund for Women (UNIFEM) and the International Centre for Islam and Pluralism (ICIP) in Jakarta, Indonesia, in March 2009; a workshop on "Sharia and Human Rights" at the University of Bergen, Norway in late November 2009; a public lecture titled "Muslim Women and Gender Justice: Methods, Motivation and Means" to the Faculty of Arts, Asia Institute, at the University of Melbourne, Australia in February 2010; a lecture on “Tawhid and Spiritual Development for Social Action” at Muslims for Progressive Values at the Pacific School of Religion in Berkeley, California in July 2011.

Wadud was awarded a three-year research grant from the Arcus foundation to do an in depth study of Classical Islamic discourse about sexual diversity and human dignity. She is founder of the online platform www.QIST1.com . QIST advocates the integration of two disciplines: Islamic studies and the studies of sexuality. She identifies as non-binary and has openly advocated "pluralism" and "equality" including dignity for LGBTQ+ persons rights.

== Controversy ==
Wadud's leading of groups in salat prayer that included adult males (a role traditionally reserved for men) and her public advocacy for this practice, has caused controversy in the Muslim world.

=== 1994 sermon ===
In August 1994, Wadud delivered a Friday pre-khutbah (sermon) on "Islam as Engaged Surrender" at the Claremont Main Road Mosque in Cape Town, South Africa. Within conservative branches of traditonalist Sunnism, some scholars disapprove of women delivering even a pre-khutbah talk.

=== 2005 prayer leadership ===
More than a decade later, Wadud was invited to lead Friday prayers (salat) for a congregation in the United States breaking with conservative-traditionalist Sunni practice. (See Women as imams for a discussion of the issue.) On Friday 18 March 2005, Wadud acted as imam for a congregation of about 60 women and 40 men seated together, without any gender separation. The call to prayer was given by another woman, Suheyla El-Attar. It was sponsored by the Muslim Women's Freedom Tour, under the leadership of Asra Nomani, by the website Muslim WakeUp!, and by members of the Progressive Muslim Union. The gathering was held in the Synod House, owned by and adjoining the Episcopal Cathedral of St. John the Divine, in Manhattan's Morningside Heights, after three mosques had refused to host the service and including the Sundaram Tagore Gallery that withdrew its offer following an anonymous bomb threat. Wadud stated her preference to hold the prayer in a sacred place. She was not an organizer of the prayer and played no part in what venue was eventually selected. She said, "I don't want to change Muslim mosques. I want to encourage the hearts of Muslims, both in their public, private and ritual affairs, to believe they are one and equal."

==== Response ====
The prayer service drew mixed reactions from the Muslim community. Over 100 men and women attended the prayers, and about half dozen people protested outside the church.

Yusuf Al-Qaradawi of Qatar said that, while a woman could lead other women and even possibly her young children in salat, she could not lead a mixed group including non-mahram males. Grand Imam of Al-Azhar Sayyid Tantawi criticized the prayer in the Egyptian newspaper Al-Ahram: "When she leads men in prayer, in this case, it is not proper for them to look at the woman whose body is in front of them."

Some Muslim academics supported Wadud. Egyptian academic Gamal al-Banna argued that her actions were supported by Islamic sources. Writer and Harvard Divinity School professor Leila Ahmed said it brought attention to the issue of women in Islam. Khaled Abou El-Fadl, professor of Islamic Studies at UCLA, California said: "What the fundamentalists are worried about is that there's going to be a ripple effect not just in the U.S. but all over the Muslim world. The women who are learned and frustrated that they cannot be the imam are going to see that someone got the guts to break ranks and do it."

The police and her employer, fearing for her security and potential collateral damage followed parents’ concern and permitted her to conduct her classes from home through a video link. In her first interview after the prayer, Wadud denied receiving any death threats and described them as media hype.

Wadud continues her speaking engagements research, writing and advocacy across the world. She accepts select invitations to lead mixed-gender prayers and to perform Friday prayer services. On October 28, 2005, following her talk at the International Congress on Islamic Feminism in Barcelona, Spain, she was invited to lead a congregation of about thirty people. Following an invitation by the Muslim Educational Centre of Oxford, she led a mixed-gender prayer in the United Kingdom, even though Muslims planning to attend were threatened with being disowned by conservative imams through personal visits from mosques.

Since 2005 there has been an increase of gender inclusive mosques and prayer services with women, men and non-binary as imams. It is a slow growing phenonema and represents Muslims who wish to establish and maintain faith practices beyond the conservative patriarchal dominance and exclusivity.

=== 2013 Madras University controversy ===
Wadud lived in India from 2012 to 2013 delivering lectures by invitation at Universities in Hydrabad, Delhi, New Delhi, across the state of Kerala where she lived, before an invitation to speak on 29 July 2013 on 'Gender and Reform in Islam' at the University of Madras in Chennai, which was cancelled with no notification to her after campus security refused to guarantee her safety citing possible law and order problems in view of opposition by some Muslim groups.[32]

== Awards ==
In 2007, Wadud received the Danish Democracy Prize.

== Personal life ==
Wadud has five children and six grandchildren. She lives in Yogyakarta, Indonesia and maintains citizenship in Oakland, California.

== Media appearances ==
Wadud was an advisor to the documentary Muhammad: Legacy of a Prophet (2002), produced by Unity Productions Foundation and broadcast on PBS.

Wadud was interviewed on WNYC radio on July 14, 2006, to discuss her book Inside the Gender Jihad. She responded to questions and comments about other activities including women in gender-mixed Friday prayer service.

In 2007, Wadud was the subject of a documentary by Iranian-Dutch filmmaker, Elli Safari, called "The Noble Struggle of Amina Wadud".

== Selected bibliography ==
=== Books ===
- Wadud, Amina (1999). Qurʼan and woman rereading the sacred text from a woman's perspective. New York: Oxford University Press. ISBN 9780198029434. Contributes a gender-inclusive reading to one of the most fundamental disciplines in Islamic thought, Qu'ranic exegesis.
- Wadud, Amina (2006). Inside the gender Jihad: women's reform in Islam. Oxford: Oneworld. ISBN 9781851684632. Continues Wadud's Qur'anic analysis and provides extensive details about her experiences as a Muslim, wife, mother, sister, scholar, and activist.
- wadud, amina (2022) Once in a Lifetime: A Memoir of the Five Pillars. UK: Kantara Press Ltd. ISBN 978-1-925025-35-7 . A progressive and inclusive discussion of the five pillars of Islam. Also available as e-book (2023). Translated into Bahasa Indonesia (2024)
- Power, Carla (2026) The Lady Imam: How amina wadud's Life and Faith Changed the World. ISBN 978-0-593-59535-0 NY One World (Penguin Random House LLC)

=== Chapters in books ===
- Wadud, Amina (2005), "Citizenship and faith", in Friedman, Marilyn (ed.), Women and citizenship, Studies in Feminist Philosophy, Oxford New York: Oxford University Press, pp. 170–187, ISBN 9780195175356.

== See also ==
- Asma Barlas
- Asma Lamrabet
- Fatema Mernissi
- Ziba Mir-Hosseini
- Azizah Y. al-Hibri
- Inclusive Mosque Initiative
