= Role of women in religion =

The role of women in religion describes the context of women who are members of religious faiths. These include:

== Specific religions ==
- Baháʼí Faith and gender equality
- Women In Buddhism
- Women in Christianity
  - Women in the Catholic Church
  - Women in Mormonism
  - Women in Quakerism
- Women in Hinduism
- Women in Islam
- Women in Judaism
- Women in Sikhism
- Women in Taoism

== Feminism ==
- Feminist theology
- Buddhist feminism
- Christian feminism
  - Mormon feminism
- Islamic feminism
- Jewish feminism

== Religious roles ==
- Ordination of women in Christian traditions
  - Anglicanism
  - Catholic church
  - Church of Scotland
  - Methodism
- Women as imams
- Women as rabbis
- Women as theological figures
