= Aysha Hidayatullah =

Associate Professor of Islamic Studies

Aysha Hidayatullah is an Associate Professor of Islamic Studies in the Department of Theology and Religious Studies at the University of San Francisco. She is most known for her work critiquing feminist interpretations of the Qur'an, Feminist Edges of the Qur'an.

== Education ==
Hidayatullah received her BA in Women Studies at Emory University, and both her Master's and PhD Degree in Religious Studies at the University of California, Santa Barbara.

== Career ==
Hidayatullah began teaching undergraduate courses on Islam, race, gender and ethics at the University of San Francisco in 2008. Her research focuses on feminist interpretations of Islamic text, representations of women and femininity in the Islamic tradition, the racialization of Islam in the United States, representations of Muslim women in the United States, and the pedagogy of Islamic studies. She has published a number of works on these topics, most noteworthy being her book Feminist Edges of the Qur'an.

Hidayatullah is the co-founder and co-chair of the American Academy of Religion's Islam, Gender, Women unit, with the goal of developing the field of gender and women in Islam. She has worked on numerous projects addressing religious diversity and Islamophobia in her field. One of which was being part of the leadership team for a pedagogical workshop on "Teaching Against Islamophobia" co-sponsored by the American Academy of Religion and the Wabash Center for Teaching and Learning in Theology and Religion.

=== Feminist Edges of the Qur'an ===
Hidayatullah's book is the first comprehensive examination of Islam and the Qur'an that follows the hermeneutics of feminism in its interpretation. She gives an overview of the 20th century exegetical tradition of Islamic feminists, and subsequently responds to and critiques their conclusions. Her feminist interpretation of the Qur'an asserts gender equality and justice as the foundation of Islamic morality. Hidayatullah challenges traditional interpretive traditions of the Qur'an by revealing the assumptions of the text to be in favour of feminist and LGBTQ+ movements.

=== Publications ===
- co-editor. Islam at Jesuit Colleges and Universities. Lane Center Series Vol. 4 (spring), 2016
- Behind Every Good Muslim Man: Fictional Representations of ‘A’isha after 9/11. Muhammad and the Digital Age (Chapter 6). Austin, TX: University of Texas Press, 2015.
- Feminist Edges of the Qur'an. UK: Oxford University Press, 2014.
- 'Speaking for Ourselves': American Muslim Women's Confessional Writings and the Problem of Alterity. Journal for Islamic Studies, Vol. 33, 2013.
- Research Guide to "Gender and Sexuality," Oxford Bibliographies Online: Islamic Studies
- Feminist Interpretation of the Qur’an in a Comparative Feminist Setting, Journal of Feminist Studies in Religion Vol. 30, (No. 2), pp. 115–129, 2014.
- Beyond Sarah and Hagar: Jewish and Muslim Reflections on Feminist Theology. Palsgrave Macmillan, 2011.
- Muslim Feminist Birthdays. Journal of Feminist Studies in Religion Vol. 27 (No. 1), pp. 119–122, 2011.
- Mariyya the Copt: Gender, Sex and Heritage in the Legacy of Muhammad's umm walad. Islam and Christian-Muslim Relations Vol. 21, (3), 2010.

== Awards and honors ==
- 2017 Dean's Scholar Award, College of Arts and Science, University of San Francisco
- 2017 Distinguished Teaching Award from the USF Faculty Association
- 2015 Ignation Service Award, University of San Francisco
