= Asma Lamrabet =

Moroccan doctor, Islamic feminist, scholar and author

- أسماء المرابط
- Born: 1961 (age 64–65); Rabat, Morocco
- Known for: Muslim feminist activist

Asma Lamrabet (Rabat, Morocco, 1961) is a Moroccan doctor, Islamic feminist, scholar and author.

== Personal life ==
Asma Lamrabet was born in Rabat. She currently resides in Rabat, Morocco. She considers her education to be occidental. She is married with one child.

== Career ==
Trained in medicine, she worked as a volunteer doctor in Spain and Latin America. She mainly worked in Chile and Mexico for eight years starting in 1995. She came into contact there with Liberation Theology, which caused her to examine her own religion.

From 2004 until 2007, she returned to Morocco, where she gathered a group of Muslim women interested in researching and reflecting upon Islam and intercultural dialog.

In 2008, she became president and a board member of International Group of Studies and Reflection on Women and Islam (GIERFI), based in Barcelona. GIERFI has members and experts from at least eight countries including the United Kingdom, France, the United States and Morocco. Their mission is to help create a new female Muslim consciousness.

In (2011) she became Director of Studies and Research Center on Women's Issues in Islam of (Rabita Mohammadia des Ulemas) under the patronage of King Mohammad VI. As director, she organized an international seminar for women across the three large Abrahamic religions.

She published English and French articles that explore contentious issues, such as interfaith marriage and religious reform, in a Muslim context.

She is a third-way feminist who revises sacred Islamic texts. She has been compared to Amina Wadud and Margot Badran due to their shared belief that the interpretations that underlie Islamic Law from the 9th century were excessively patriarchal and must be reinterpreted. Lamrabet has also cited Gayatri Chakravorty Spivak as intellectual inspiration to resist the hegemony of Western feminism.

== Third way feminist ==
"Third-way" is a term coined by Doris H. Gray and is a humanistic approach to Islamic feminism. It attempts to reunite the two Islamic sects that “presuppose the existence of a basic set of human values that reaches across borders and cultures”. Currently, it is used mainly by Moroccan feminists. Lamrabet and her peers reinterpret the sacred texts in order to show women as independent beings rather than relational to men. Lamrabet's works are an example of how to apply third way feminism, because she examines the sacred texts in a scholarly manner, while remembering the cultural context in which they were written. Lamrabet also believes in a particular type of secularism that is based in Islam, rather than Western conceptions of it. She believes that religion should not be used for personal or political gain.

=== Criticism ===
Her work provoked critics who argued that this approach does not tackle the important issues, such as violence towards women and polygamy sufficiently. Another critique held that third-way feminists lack sufficient theological knowledge and background to correctly interpret the texts. Her work has been described as conceptually and methodically weak. Her work was said to “border on the kind of Islamic fundamentalist propaganda familiar from the Moroccan Islamic political activist, Nadia Yassine” and her work in identity is “antiquated in the relevant sociological debates”.

== Awards ==
In 2013, she was awarded the Social Sciences Award by the Arab Woman Organization for her book, Femmes et hommes dans le Coran: quelle égalité?.

== Bibliography ==
- Musulmane tout simplement published in 2002 by Edition Tawhid
- Epouse du Prophète ou l’Islam au feminine, published in 2004 by Editions Tawhid
- Le Coran et les femmes : une lecture de libération published in 2007 by Editions Tawhid
- Femmes . Islam. Occident: chemins vers l'universel published in 2011 by Séguier
- Femmes et hommes dans le Coran: quelle égalité? published in 2012 by Editions al-Bouraq
- Women in the Qur'an: An Emancipatory Reading published in 2016 by Kube Publishing Ltd
