= Ibtissam Bouachrine =

Researcher in Islamic gender studies

Academic background
- Education: Tulane University, PhD; West Virginia University, MA, BA

Academic work
- Discipline: women and gender issues in Islam
- Institutions: Smith College

Ibtissam Bouachrine is a researcher in Islamic gender studies, professor and chair at Smith College in the department of Spanish and Portuguese. Bouachrine is a visiting scholar at the Institute for Rebooting Social Media. According to Harvard Law Today, Bouachrine has ongoing interdisciplinary research interests in the topics namely technology, ethics, law, and women’s rights in Muslim-majority societies. Bouachrine is on editorial board of The Journal of the Middle East and Africa.

== Life and career ==
Ibtissam Bouachrine was born in Casablanca, Morocco. Bouachrine has a bachelor’s degree and a master’s degree from West Virginia University. She gained a Ph.D. in medieval Iberian literatures and cultures from Tulane University in New Orleans.

Bouachrine then joined the Smith College faculty. She served as former director of the Middle East studies program the co-director of the Women’s Education Concentration. In 2021, she became a full professor at Smith.

== Bibliography ==
=== Books ===
- Bouachrine, Ibtissam. Anthem of Misogyny: The War on Women in North Africa and the Middle East. United Kingdom, Rowman & Littlefield Publishers, 2022.
- Bouachrine, Ibtissam. Women and Islam: Myths, Apologies, and the Limits of Feminist Critique. United States, Lexington Books, 2014.

=== Journal articles ===
- Ibtissam Bouachrine (2012) In the absence of men: representing Andalusi women's sexuality in the context of military conflict, Journal of Medieval Iberian Studies, 4:1, 77-81, doi:10.1080/17546559.2012.677182
- Bouachrine, Ibtissam. Rjal et leurs reines: le Printemps arabe et le discours sur la masculinité et la féminité. N.p., n.p, 2011.
- Women and gardens in medieval and early modern Mediterranean literatures and cultures, Tulane University ProQuest Dissertations Publishing, 2005. 3210842.
- Bouachrine, Ibtissam. Goldstein, L Judith. Muslim and Jewish Women :Historical and cultural contexts. The Routledge Handbook of Muslim–Jewish Relations. Ed. Josef Meri. (2016) p.p. 295. ISBN 978-1-315-67578-7
- Ali, Kecia. Transgressing all bounds? Gendering authority and Engendering orthodoxy. Freedom of Expression in Islam: Challenging Apostasy and Blasphemy Laws. Ed.Masud, Muhammad Khalid. United Kingdom, Bloomsbury Publishing, 2021.
- Hachad, Naïma. Revisionary Narratives: Moroccan Women's Auto/biographical and Testimonial Acts. United Kingdom, Liverpool University Press, 2019. p.p. 143
- Women and Social Change in North Africa: What Counts as Revolutionary?. Singapore, Cambridge University Press, 2018. pp. 122
