= Olfa Youssef =

- ألفة يوسف
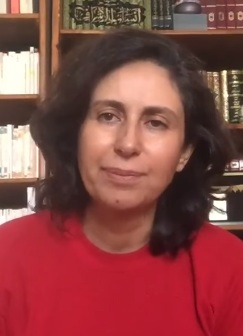
- Youssef in 2017
- Born: 1964 (age 61–62); Sousse, Tunisia
- Education: École Normale Supérieure de Tunis (BA)
- Occupations: Linguist, Islamic scholar

Olfa Youssef is a Tunisian university professor and a writer specializing in Arabic linguistics, psychoanalysis and Applied Islamic Studies. Her publications deal with themes related to Islam, the Quran, the place of women in Islam, religious freedom and cross-religious dialogue.

== Biography ==
Olfa Youssef was born in 1964 in the coastal city of Sousse, where she received her primary and secondary education. She then studied at the École Normale Supérieure de Tunis to receive a BA and an "aggregation" diploma. Being valedictorian during most of her studies, she was awarded and honored by President Habib Bourguiba in 1987. Youssef's PhD in Arabic language and literature defended in 2002 deals with the subject of “Polysemy in the Quran.”

Youssef occupied various administrative positions including serving as the director of the Higher Institute for Children's Executives in Carthage as well as the head of the National Library of Tunisia from 2009 to 2011.

== Academic work ==
In 2003, Youssef published her doctoral study "Polysemy in the Quran" which adopts a linguistic approach in its analysis of the Quranic text to come to the poststructuralist conclusion that meaning is inevitably multiple. Generally, Youssef claims that although certain dogmas have always been taken for granted throughout the long history of Islam, there is no proof in the Quran that makes them unquestionable rules.

Such ideas are expressed, for instance, in her book The Confusion of a Muslim Woman: On Inheritance, Marriage and Homosexuality (2008). After reading such a book, conservatives concluded that Youssef insinuates that homosexuality is not illicit in Islam, that a girl is not necessarily supposed to inherit half of her brother's part from their parents, and that a man does not necessarily have the right to be polygamous. The book led to controversies and court suits.

Youssef wrote The Dramatic Discourse of Mahmoud Messadi's The Dam and co-authored The Dramatic Discourse of Mahmoud Messadi's The Dam (1994) and published Women in Quran and Sunnah (1997), The Quran at the Risk of Psychoanalysis (2007), Bereft of Reason and Religion (2003), and Yearning (2010) among other books.
