= Women Living Under Muslim Laws =

International solidarity network

- Abbreviation: WLUML
- Formation: 1984
- Type: Non-governmental organization
- Legal status: Solidarity network
- Purpose: Research and activism
- Location: London
- Website: www.wluml.org
- Formerly called: Action Committee of Women Living Under Muslim Laws

Women Living Under Muslim Laws (WLUML) is an international solidarity network established in 1984. It does academic and advocacy work in the fields of women's rights and secularism, focusing on the impact on women of laws inspired by Muslim religion or customs.

== Origins ==
The trigger for the establishment of the network was independent events in various parts of the Muslim world, "in which so-called Islamic laws deprived women of their human rights". Women from Algeria, Morocco, Sudan, Iran, Mauritius, Tanzania, Bangladesh and Pakistan founded an action committee in 1980 to support women's struggles for their rights on site. This resulted in the network with coordination offices in London, Dakar and Lahore between 1984 and 1986. It does not represent an ideology or uniform point of view.

The network started out as a loose organization with no fixed membership, where individual and groups assumed responsibility for specific initiatives. It attracted women harmed by Muslim laws, whether they are Muslims or not, bringing together religious believers, human rights advocates, secularists and atheists. Until Marieme Helie Lucas retired as international coordinator in the late 1990s, it remained a fluid organization without clearly defined staff positions.

== Research and current work ==
The network coordinates research exploring the mechanism by which laws affecting women borrow from cultural practices and colonial laws in addition to religious dogma, to eliminate progressive laws and restrict women's freedom. It also facilitates communication between women's groups across Africa and Asia, sharing success stories and helping to coordinate international actions. It conducted studies and advocated on issues such as forced marriage of girls and stoning. The group's research on the impact of Muslim family law led to the founding of the Musawah campaign in 2009.

Some governments look unfavorably upon the group's work. Collaboration with Women Living Under Muslim Laws was mentioned as a motive for the 2016 arrest of both Nazanin Zaghari-Ratcliffe and Homa Hoodfar by Iranian authorities. Since 1986, the organization has published the journal Dossier (ISSN 1560-9677). The purpose of the journal is to analyse and publicise issues which impact Muslim women under both secular and religious regimes, by telling women's stories. Reviewer Pragna Patel, called the journal "invaluable", because of the quality of information regarding human rights and recognition of the variances in women's experiences in different Muslim societies.

== See also ==
- Women related laws in Pakistan
- Hermeneutics of feminism in Islam
