= Marieme Helie Lucas =

Algerian sociologist and human rights activist (born 1939)

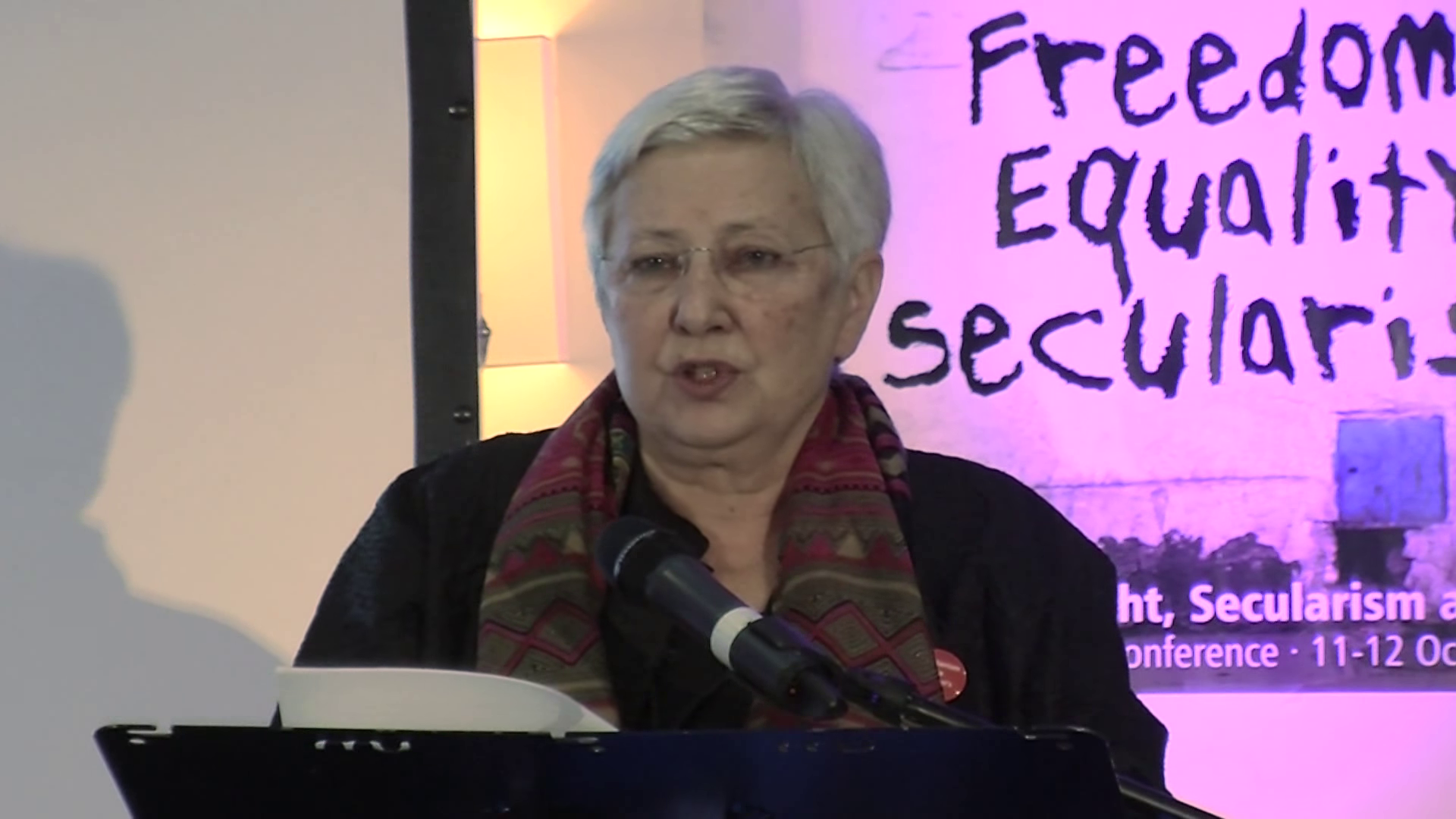
- Lucas in 2014
- Born: 1939 (age 86–87); Algiers, French Algeria
- Citizenship: Algerian
- Occupations: Sociologist, human rights activist
- Organization(s): Women Living Under Muslim Laws, Secularism is a Women's Issue
- Known for: Women's rights activism, secularism advocacy

Marieme Helie Lucas is an Algerian sociologist as well as an activist for women's rights and secularism. She occupied leadership positions in human rights groups starting in the 1980s.

== Influences and activism ==
Along with a strong family tradition of activism, Lucas' social involvement was influenced by Algeria's period of decolonisation and the subsequent challenges to women's rights posed by religious fundamentalists. She left a university position in human rights research and teaching in the 1980s to help establish the group Women Living Under Muslim Laws (in 1984) and become its first international coordinator. She is also a founding member of the Women Human Rights Defenders Coalition.

Lucas co-founded Secularism is a Women's Issue in 2006. The organization advocates against allowing separate legal frameworks for people or specific faith communities, such as courts using Sharia law, arguing those regimes are often detrimental to women's rights. The group also collects and distributes information on the situation of secularists and atheists in countries where Muslims make up a large part of the population. It also advocates for secularism in Europe.

== Current interests ==
Lucas is interested in how European societies respond to religious fundamentalism, as well as to xenophobic movements. Comparing theocracy (immutable law handed out by god) to democracy (laws evolving through decision by people), Lucas argues any rules based on religion are by nature anti-democratic. The debates around immigration in European countries adds a complex dimension to that debate, for Lucas: "Unfortunately, the European Left and Far-Left, that should be our natural allies, have not yet understood that they should not throw themselves in the arms of Muslim fundamentalists in order to counter the traditional extreme right parties..." She also works to uncover the history of atheism and feminism in countries where Islam has major influence.

== Selected publications ==
- Lucas, Marieme Hélie, ed. (2011). The Struggle for Secularism in Europe and North America: Women from Migrant Descent Facing the Rise of Fundamentalism (PDF). London: Woman Living Under Muslim Laws. ISBN 978-1907024221. Archived from the original (PDF) on 2015-10-05.
- Lucas, Marieme Helie (2012). "Des femmes issues de l'émigration 'musulmane' se battent pour la laïcité" [The Struggle for Secularism in Europe and North America]. Cahiers du genre (in French). 3 (3): 213–214. doi:10.3917/cdge.hs03.0213.
- Lucas, Marieme Helie (2018). "Women's Rights, Secularism, and the Colonial Legacy". Canadian Woman Studies. 33 (1–2): 85–98.
