= Leila Ahmed =

Egyptian-American writer and professor

- ليلى أحمد
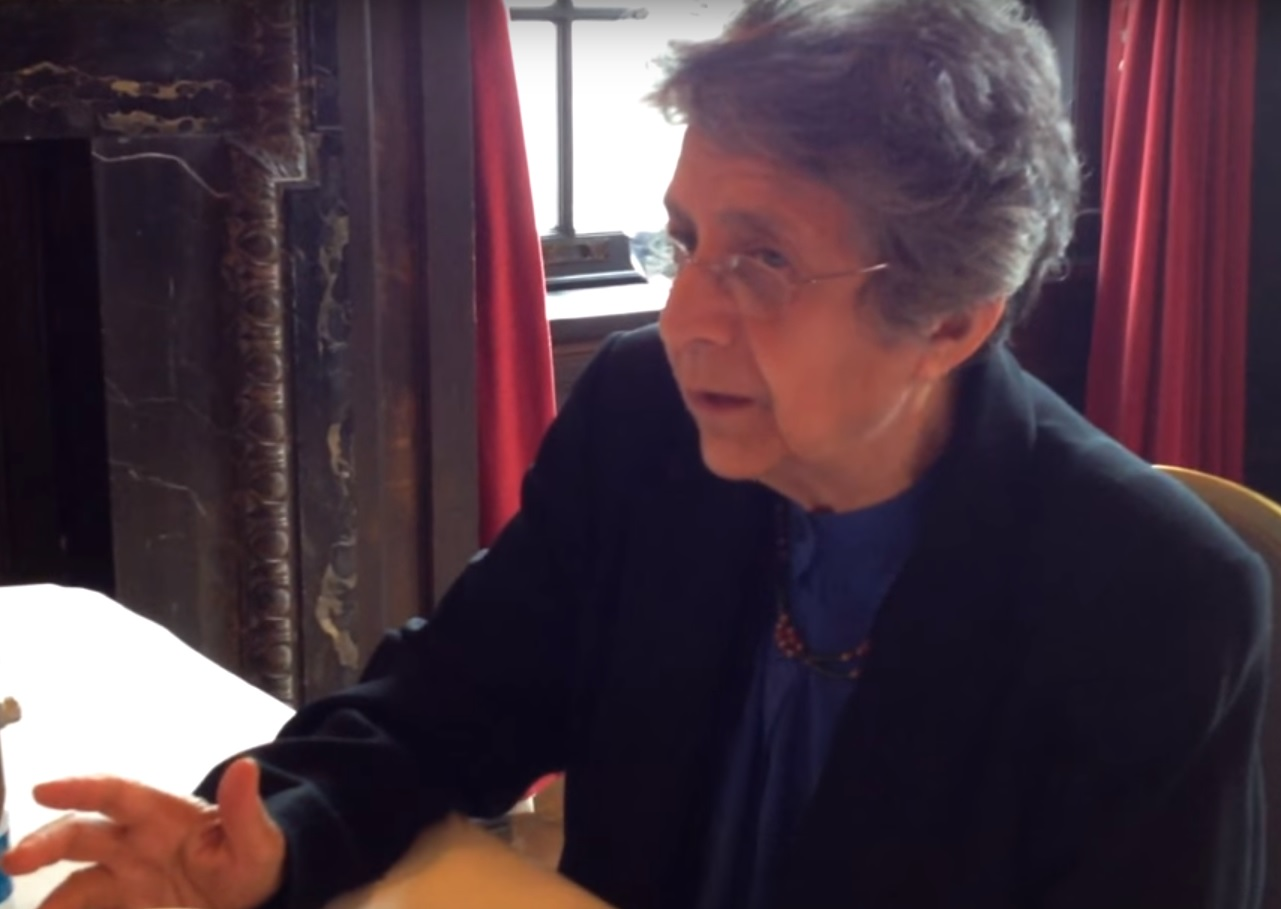
- Leila Ahmed in 2013
- Born: 29 May 1940 (age 86); Heliopolis, Cairo, Egypt
- Education: University of Cambridge (BA, MA, PhD)
- Occupations: Professor; scholar
- Awards: Grawemeyer Award in Religion for A Quiet Revolution

Leila Ahmed (Arabic: لیلى أحمد; born 29 May 1940) is an Egyptian-American scholar of women's studies and religion. In 1992 she published her book Women and Gender in Islam, which is regarded as a pioneering historical analysis of the position of women in Arab Muslim societies. She became the first professor of women's studies in religion at Harvard Divinity School in 1999, and has held the Victor S. Thomas Professor of Divinity chair since 2003. She was later awarded the Victor S. Thomas Research Professor of Divinity in 2020.

== Biography ==
Born in the Heliopolis district of Cairo to a middle-class Egyptian father and an upper class Turkish mother in 1940, Ahmed's childhood was shaped both by Muslim Egyptian values and the liberal orientation of Egypt's aristocracy under the ancien régime. The Ahmed family became politically ostracized following the Free Officers Movement in 1952. Her father, a civil engineer, was a vocal opponent of Gamal Abdel Nasser's construction of the Aswan High Dam on ecological principles.

She earned her undergraduate and doctorate degrees from University of Cambridge during the 1960s before moving to the United States to teach and write, where she was appointed to professorship in Women's Studies and Near Eastern studies at the University of Massachusetts Amherst, and the position of director in said programs in 1981. A professorship in Women's Studies and Religion at the Harvard Divinity School followed in 1999, where she currently teaches.

== Views ==
=== Nationalism ===
Ahmed has been a strong critic of Arab nationalism in Egypt and the Middle East. She devotes an entire chapter in her autobiography to the question of Arab nationalism, and the political factors and efforts which went into constructing an Arab identity for Egypt after the army's coup d'état. According to Ahmed's research, the idea that Egyptians were "Arab" was virtually unheard of well into the 20th century. She describes Arab nationalism, like many other forms of pan-nationalism, as a type of cultural imperialism. This cultural imperialism eats away at the diversity and cultural creativity of not only the Arabic-speaking national majorities (who often speak widely divergent vernaculars), but also the non-Arabic speaking minorities throughout the Middle East and North Africa.

=== Veiling ===
In 2013, Ahmed, who had previously opposed the veil, received the University of Louisville Grawemeyer Award in Religion for her analysis of the veiling of Muslim women in the United States, in which she describes how some women wore the veil as a symbol of activism for justice and social change. As such, she no longer believes that the resurgence of the veil was solely driven by patriarchy, a view she held when she was younger, as she noted how many women in the United States wore it as a symbol of their Islamic identity, social justice, and to raise other women's awareness of society's sexist messages about women's bodies and dress. However, she believes that the veil has no universal meaning and is still driven by forces of patriarchy in other places around the world.

From a description of Ahmed's work provided by Yale University Press: "Ahmed observed that Islamism, with its commitments to activism in the service of the poor and in pursuit of social justice, is the strain of Islam most easily and naturally merging with western democracies' own tradition of activism in the cause of justice and social change. It is often Islamists, even more than secular Muslims, who are at the forefront of such contemporary activist struggles as civil rights and women's rights. Ahmed's surprising conclusions represent a near reversal of her thinking on this topic."

== Work ==
=== A Border Passage (1999) ===
In her 1999 memoir A Border Passage, Ahmed describes her multicultural Cairene upbringing and her adult life as an expatriate and an immigrant in Europe and the United States. She tells of how she was introduced to Islam through her grandmother during her childhood, and she came to distinguish it from "official Islam" as practiced and preached by a largely male religious elite. This realization would later form the basis of her first acclaimed book, Women and Gender in Islam (1992), a now-classic work on Islamic history, Muslim feminism, and the historical role of women in Islam as well as Muslim discourses about women.

=== Women and Gender in Islam (1992) ===
In her germinal work, Women and Gender in Islam (1992), Ahmed argues that the oppressive practices to which women in the Middle East are subjected are caused by the prevalence of patriarchal interpretations of Islam rather than Islam itself.

Islamic doctrine developed within an androcentric, misogynist society, that of Abbasid Iraq, the customs of which were largely inherited from the Sasanian Empire after its conquest.

Despite such resistance, establishment Islam experienced little serious challenge until early 19th-century colonial encroachment. European colonialisms' remit was essentially economic; however, female emancipation was used as an argument to legitimate geopolitical incursion. Colonial feminism was a Western discourse of dominance which, "introduced the notion that an intrinsic connection existed between the issue of culture and the status of women, and … that progress for women could be achieved only through abandoning the native culture."

Inevitably, the initial reaction to this was a rejection of Western values by political Islamists. This rejection saw the conflation of Islam and culture where Islamic authenticity became defined in terms of cultural authenticity and, specifically, the role of women within Islam. This led to a reaffirmation of indigenous customs relating to women and restoration of the customs and laws of past Islamic societies. The underlying assumption was that there is an authentic interpretation of Islam that is based on the texts and institutions developed in Abbasid Iraq. According to such assumptions, the meaning of gender and the position of women within Islam is "unambiguous and ascertainable in some precise and absolute sense."

Women and Gender in Islam was republished by Yale University Press in 2021 in its Veritas paperback series with a foreword by Kecia Ali.

== Bibliography ==
=== Books and book chapters ===
- Edward W. Lane: A study of his life and works and of British ideas of the Middle East in the Nineteenth century. London: Longman (1978)
- "A Traditional Ceremony in an Islamic Milieu in Malaysia", in Muslim Women (1984)
- "Between Two Worlds: The Formation of a Turn-of-the-Century Egyptian Feminist", in Life/Lines: Theorizing Women's Autobiography (1988)
- "Arab Women: 1995", in The Next Arab Decade: Alternative Futures (1988)
- "Feminism and Cross-Cultural Inquiry: The terms of discourse in Islam" In Coming to Terms: Feminism, Theory and Politics. Ed. Elizabeth Weed. New York: Routledge (1989)
- Women and Gender in Islam: Historical Roots of a Modern Debate. New Haven: Yale University Press (1992, 2021)
- A Border Passage: From Cairo to America—A Woman's Journey. New York: Farrar Straus & Giroux (1999)
- A Quiet Revolution: The Veil's Resurgence, from the Middle East to America. New Haven. Yale University Press (2011)

=== Articles ===
- "Women in the rise of Islam." The new Voices of Islam : Rethinking Politics and Modernity : a Reader. Ed. Mehran Kamrava. Berkeley, CA: University of California Press, 2006. 177–200.
- "The Discourse of the Veil." Post Colonialisms: an Anthology of Cultural Theory and Criticism. Ed. Gaurav Desai and Supriya Nair. New Brunswick, NJ: Rutgers University Press, 2005. 315–338.
- "The Veil Debate Again: a View from America in the Early Twenty-first Century". On Shifting Ground: Muslim Women in the Global Era. Ed. Fereshteh Nourale-Simone. New York: Feminist Press at the City University of New York, 2005.
- "Gender and literacy in Islam." Nothing Sacred: Women Respond to Religious Fundamentalism and Terror. Ed. Betsy Reed. New York: Thunder's Mouth Press/Nation Books, 2002.
- "The Women of Islam". Transition 83 (2000): 78–97.
- "Early Islam and the position of Women: the problem of interpretation." Women in Middle Eastern History: Shifting Boundaries in Sex and Gender. Ed. Nikki R. Keddie, Beth Baron. New Haven: Yale University Press, 1993.
- "Arab Culture and Writing Woman's Bodies." Gender Issues 9.1 (March 1, 1989): 41–55.
- "Women and the Advent of Islam." Signs 11.4 (Summer, 1986): 665–691.
- "Feminism and Feminist Movements in the Middle East, a Preliminary Exploration: Turkey, Egypt, Algeria, People's Democratic Republic of Yemen." Women and Islam. Ed. Ellen Skinner. Virginia: Pergamon Press: 1982. 153.
- "Western Ethnocentrism and Perceptions of the Harem." Feminist Studies 8.3 (Autumn, 1982): 521–534.
- Ahmed, Leila, Krishna Ahooja-Patel, Charlotte Bunch, Nilufer Cagatay, Ursula Funk, Dafna N. Izraeli, Margaret McIntosh, Helen I. Safa, and Aline K. Wong. "Comments on Tinker's 'A Feminist view of Copenhagen". Signs 6.4 (Summer, 1981): 771–790.
- "Encounter with American Feminism: A Muslim Woman's View of Two Conferences". Women's Studies Newsletter 8.3 (Summer, 1980): 7–9.

== Filmography ==
- Ahmed was an advisor to the award-winning, PBS-broadcast documentary Muhammad: Legacy of a Prophet (2002), produced by Unity Productions Foundation.
