= Margot Badran =

Scholar of Middle Eastern history and women studies

- Born: December 4, 1936 (age 89)
- Education: Trinity College Dublin (BA); Harvard University (MA); University of Oxford (PhD); Al-Azhar University
- Occupations: Historian, professor, author
- Known for: Gender studies, Islamic studies, Islamic feminism

Margot Badran is an American professor of Middle Eastern history with a focus on women and gender studies. She is a well-known scholar on the topic of Islamic feminism.

== Early life and education ==
Badran earned her BA at Trinity College Dublin, followed by her MA at Harvard University, and her PhD from the University of Oxford. She also has a degree in Arabic and Islamic Studies from Al-Azhar University in Cairo, Egypt.

== Career ==
Badran is a senior scholar at the Woodrow Wilson International Center for Scholars in its Middle East program. She is also a senior fellow at the Prince Alwaleed Bin Talal Center for Muslim-Christian Understanding at Georgetown University.

After the 1991 liberation of Kuwait from Iraqi invaders, Badran traveled around the country interviewing female resistance fighters, later remarking on the risks women were forced to take in defense of their country.

In his review of Badran's 2011 book Gender and Islam in Africa: Rights, Sexuality, and Law, An Van Raemdonck praises Badran for her interdisciplinary approach as she "brings together the work of historians, linguists, anthropologists and scholars in the fields of area studies, gender and religion studies". He cites the extensive fieldwork and research that went into the work, along with its "in-depth knowledge of regional and historical context". The journal African Studies Review praised Badran's work for providing analysis into "how women negotiate complex discursive and political terrains".

=== Islamic feminism ===
Badran has conducted extensive research on the topic of Islamic feminism and has written numerous articles and given multiple lectures on the topic throughout the world. Badran states that Islamic feminism is not an oxymoron because "it offers a holistic solution for women activists and/or intellectual-activists who are invested in gender justice but who are not interested in separating religion from their struggles". Badran further states that Islamic feminism "derives its understanding and mandate from the Qur’an, seeks rights and justice for women, and for men, in the totality of their existence." She also argues that Islam and feminism are not mutually exclusive.

Badran has compared the efforts of women's activism in both the 1919 Egypt revolution with Egypt's 2011 revolution, noting how the 1919 revolution led to the beginning of the feminist movement in Egypt. However, she notes that the work done on Islamic feminism is not as widespread in Egypt as in other areas within the Middle East.

== Bibliography ==
- Opening the Gates: A Century of Arab Feminist Writing (written with Miriam Cooke) Indiana University Press (1990). ISBN 9780253311214
- Feminists, Islam, and Nation: Gender and the Making of Modern Egypt Princeton University Press (1996). ISBN 9781400821433
- Feminism Beyond East and West: New Gender Talk and Practice in Global Islam Global Media Publications (2007). ISBN 9788188869237
- Gender and Islam in Africa: Rights, Sexuality, and Law Woodrow Wilson Center Press (2011). ISBN 9780804774819
- Feminism in Islam: Secular and Religious Convergences Oneworld Publications (2013). ISBN 9781780744476
