= List of Cairo University alumni =

Notable alumni and attendees of Cairo University are listed here, first by decade of their graduation (or last attendance) and then alphabetically.

== Unknown date of attendance and graduation ==
- Ahmed Mohamed Al-Hofi (1910–1983) Member of the Shu a and of the Academy of the Arabic Language.
- Kamil Idris is a former director general of the World Intellectual Property Organization (WIPO). He earned a BA in philosophy, political science and economic theories from Cairo University (Division I with Honours). He was also a lecturer in philosophy and jurisprudence there (1976–1977).
- Heba Kotb (born 1967), Egyptian sex therapist and TV host

== 1800s ==
- Naguib Pasha Mahfouz, the father of obstetrics and gynaecology in Egypt, and a world pioneer in obstetric fistula.
- Abdel Khalek Sarwat Pasha (1873–1928), twice Prime Minister of Egypt (March 1, 1922 - November 30, 1922) and (April 26, 1927 - March 16, 1928). graduated with a License de Droit from the School of Law, later Cairo University in 1893.

== 1910s ==
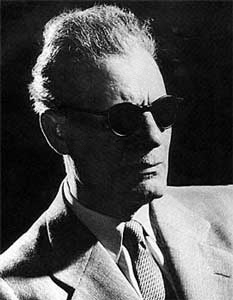
Taha Hussein

- Taha Hussein (1889–1973) was born in Izbit il-Kilo, Egypt. In 1914 he graduated from Cairo University. Later he was the first Egyptian Dean of the Faculty of the Arts there and the first Egyptian to be nominated for a Nobel Prize in Literature. He was also Minister of Education. He was blind from early childhood.

== 1920s ==
- Hassan Fathy, widely acclaimed architect of the 20th century. Fathy promoted appropriate technology and design for Egyptian construction and context, and was recognized with an Aga Khan Award for Architecture in 1980.
- Soheir El-Calamawy, writer and translator; first woman to join the university.

== 1930s ==
- Mufidah Abdul Rahman, the first female lawyer to take cases to the Court of Cassation in Egypt, the first woman to practice law in Cairo, Egypt, the first woman to plead a case before a military court in Egypt, and the first woman to plead cases before courts in the south of Egypt.
- Yehia Hakki is one of the pioneers of the 20th-century modern literary movement in Egypt. He has experimented with the various literary norms: the short story, the novel, literary criticism, essays, meditations, and literary translation.

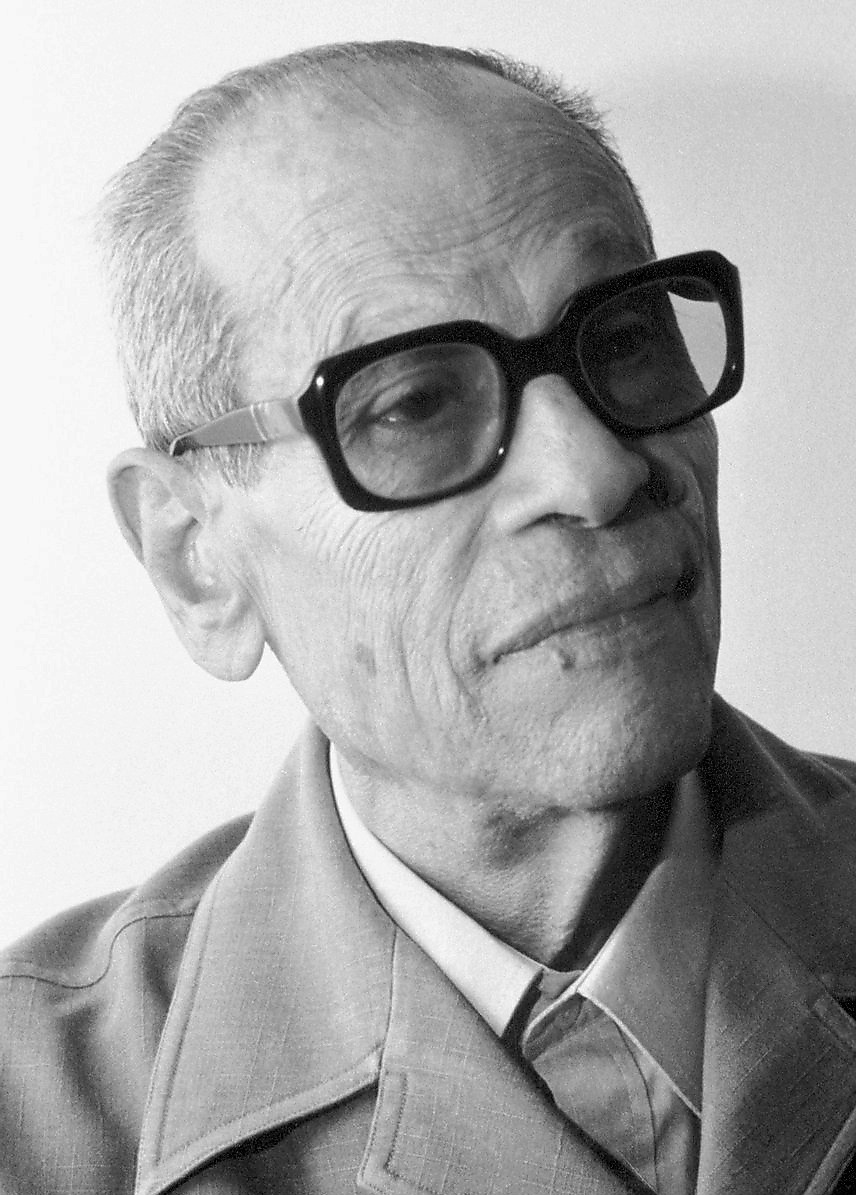
Naguib Mahfouz

- Writer and philosopher Naguib Mahfouz was born in the Gamaliyya district of Cairo in 1911. He graduated from Cairo University in 1934. He has published more than fifty books of fiction, many of which have been translated and published in English. The film Cairo 1930 was based on his novel al-Qahira al-jadida. In 1988 he won the Nobel Prize in Literature.
- Zaki Naguib Mahmoud was a "Philosopher of Authors & Author of Philosophers". He was an associate of philosopher Bertrand Russell and John Eyre. He graduated from the Faculty of Arts at Cairo University in 1930. He earned his PhD in England, then returned to Egypt and became a professor of philosophy at his alma mater. He also taught at Kuwait University and wrote for Al-Ahram newspaper. He wrote many books, including The Philosophy of Science (1952), The Reasonable and the Absurd in our Intellectual Heritage (1975), and Seeds and Roots (1990).
- Sameera Moussa was an Egyptian nuclear scientist. She graduated with a BSc in radiology from Cairo University.
- Ahmed Shawky Deif was an Arabic literary critic, historian and president of the Academy of the Arabic Language in Cairo.

== 1940s ==
- Husayn Fawzi Alnajjar(1918–2003), an Egyptian Historian, Political Scientist, Strategist, and Islamic scholar. He graduated in 1940 with a M.A. in military sciences.
- Hikmat Abu Zayd is the former Minister of Social Affairs (1962–1965) under Gamal Abdel Nasser and the first female cabinet member in Egypt. She received a licence in history from Cairo University (then named Fuad I University) in 1940 and went on to receive a teaching certificate in 1941, a MA in education in 1950, and a PhD in educational psychology from the University of London in 1957.
- Said Ashour, professor of history
- Boutros Boutros-Ghali is an Egyptian diplomat and was the sixth Secretary-General of the United Nations from January 1992 to December 1996. He graduated from Cairo University in 1946 and earned a PhD in international law from the University of Paris as well as a diploma in international relations from the Institut d'Etudes Politiques de Paris.
- Nazeer Gayed was Pope Shenouda III of Alexandria. Born in 1923, he earned a BA in English and history from Cairo University in 1947. Later he attended the Coptic Theological Seminary. After becoming a hermit for several years, he became Dean of the Coptic Orthodox Theological University. He was consecrated the 117th Pope of Alexandria in 1971.
- Mohamed Hassanein Heikal is a prominent Egyptian journalist. He served as the editor-in-chief of the Cairo newspaper Al-Ahram (1957–1974). Heikal has been a respected commentator on Arab and Middle Eastern affairs for more than 50 years.
- Halim El-Dabh (born 1921), Egypt's foremost living composer of classical music, and the composer (in 1960) of the original score to the Son et lumière show at the site of the Great Pyramids of Giza. He earned a Bachelor of Science degree in agricultural engineering in 1945 and emigrated to the United States in 1950.
- Hassan Fathy, eco-engineer.
- Osman Ahmed Osman, engineer and politician.
- Magdi Wahba (1925–1991), Egypt's foremost lexicographer and professor of English Literature from 1957 to 1980 when he retired as emeritus professor. He obtained his LLB from the Faculty of Law in 1946.

== 1950s ==
- Ihsan Abbas (1920–2003) was a Palestinian scholar and literary critic. He earned his BA, MA and PhD degrees from the University of Cairo between 1950 and 1960. Abbas went on to teach at the University of Khartoum and American University of Beirut, in addition to performing research for the University of Jordan after his retirement.
- Fayza Haikal (1938-), is an Egyptian Egyptologist. After earning her BA degree from Cairo University she went on to earn a doctorate degree from Oxford University, as the first Egyptian woman. She was Professor of Egyptology at the American University in Cairo and was visiting professor at several other universities.
- Latifa al-Zayyat (1923–1996) was an Egyptian artist and intellectual. She was born in Dumyat and earned her PhD in English literature from Cairo University in 1957. She was head of the English department there from 1976 to 1983. Her first novel, Al-Bab al-Maftooh (The Open Door) was published in 1960. Later in life she founded and led the Committee for the Defense of National Culture, which spearheaded efforts against the normalization of cultural relations with Israel.

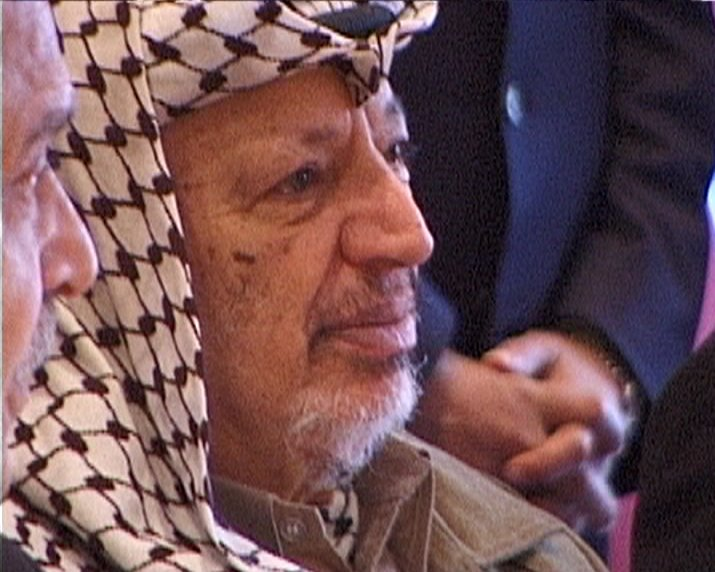
Yasser Arafat

- Yasser Arafat was chairman of the Palestine Liberation Organization (PLO) (1969–2004), president of the Palestinian National Authority (PNA) (1993–2004); and a co-recipient of the 1994 Nobel Peace Prize alongside Shimon Peres and Yitzhak Rabin, for the successful negotiations of the 1993 Oslo Accords. He graduated from the King Fuad Cairo University Faculty of Engineering in 1956. While there, he joined the Muslim Brotherhood and served as president of the Union of Palestinian Students from 1952 to 1956.
- Sayyid Abdurahman Imbichikoya Thangal Al-Aydarusi Al-Azhari was the President of Samastha Kerala Jem-iyyathul Ulama (1995–2004), the largest Muslim organisation in Kerala, India
- Yusuf Idris, physician and writer.
- Amr Moussa is the Secretary-General of the League of Arab States. He graduated from the Cairo University Faculty of Law in 1957.
- Notaila Rashed (1934–2012) was an Egyptian children's author and translator. She helped found and was the editor-in-chief of the leading Egyptian children's magazine during its time, Samir.
- Geneviève Baqtar Sydarous (1925–2016), journalist and translator
- Magdi Yacoub is a professor of cardiothoracic surgery at Imperial College London. He was involved in the first UK heart transplant in 1980, carried out the first UK live lobe lung transplant and went on to perform more transplants than any other surgeon in the world. Mr. Yacoub graduated from the Faculty of Medicine at Cairo University in 1957.

== 1960s ==
- Ghazi Al-Qusaibi is a Saudi Arabian liberal politician, novelist, Saudi Minister of Labor, and intellectual. He received his law degree from Cairo University in 1961. He earned his MA in international relations from the University of Southern California in 1964, and obtained his PhD in law from the University of London in 1970.
- Eid Hassan Doha is a former mathematics professor at the university who earned bachelor's, masters, and doctorate degrees at the school.
- Mohamed ElBaradei was the director general of the International Atomic Energy Agency from 1997 to 2005. He was born in Egypt in 1942 and earned a bachelor's degree in law from the University of Cairo in 1962 and a doctorate in international law at the New York University School of Law in 1974. He won the 2005 Nobel Peace Prize. His name has been circulated by opposition groups since 2009 as a possible candidate to succeed President Hosni Mubarak in Egypt's highest executive position.
- Mohamed Ghonim The international urologist and founder of the Mansoura University Urology & Nephrology Center.
- Saddam Hussein was the president of Iraq from 1979 until he lost power over Iraq when American troops arrived in Baghdad on 9 April 2003. He entered the Faculty of Law at Cairo University in 1962 and left to return to Iraq in 1964. He also attended Mustanseriya University in Baghdad. He was executed on 30 December 2006 for crimes against humanity.
- Archaeologist Mikhail Borisovich Piotrovski is the director of the State Hermitage Museum in St. Petersburg, Russia. He was born in Armenia in 1944. In 1967 he graduated from the Oriental Faculty of Leningrad State University, having majored in Arabic Studies. He attended Cairo University from 1965 to 1966. He is a corresponding member of the Russian Academy of Sciences and a professor at St. Petersburg State University. He was awarded the Russian Order of Honor in 1997. Asteroid 4869 Piotrovsky is named after him and his father, Professor Boris Borisovich Piotrovski.
- Adel S. Sedra received his B.Sc. in electrical engineering from Cairo University in 1964. After completing his M.A.Sc. and PhD degrees, Sedra joined the faculty of the University of Toronto in 1969 and became associate professor in 1972 and professor in 1978. He served as chair of the Department of Electrical Engineering from 1986 to 1993, and was vice president, provost, and chief academic officer from July 1, 1993, to 2002. On July 1, 2003, Sedra joined the University of Waterloo as dean of its Faculty of Engineering and as professor of electrical and computer engineering.
- Omar Sharif is an Egyptian-born actor (of Lebanese and Syrian origin) who has starred in many Hollywood films. He studied maths and physics at Cairo University and graduated in 1963.
- Ahmed Ezz (born in 1959) graduated from Cairo University with a degree in civil engineering. He is an Egyptian politician and business tycoon and the chairman and managing director of Al Ezz Industries.
- George Issac, (born 1938) is a political activist and a Coptic Catholic. He graduated with a BA in history in 1964.
- Hoda ElMaraghy (born 1945)
- Walid Muallem, Deputy Prime Minister and Minister of Foreign Affairs and Expatriates of Syria

== 1970s ==
- Mahmoud al-Zahar, co founded Hamas alongside Sheikh Ahmed Yassin. He currently serves as foreign minister in the Palestinian National Authority government of Ismail Haniyeh in Gaza. He studied medicine at Cairo University.
- Ayman al-Zawahiri is a prominent member of the al-Qaeda group, a physician, author, poet, and formerly the head of the militant organization Egyptian Islamic Jihad. He obtained a degree in surgery at Cairo University in 1974 and an advanced medical degree in 1978.
- Mohsen Badawi, Chairman of Aracom Systems, was born in Cairo on 10 November 1956. Entrepreneur, political activist and writer, graduated from Cairo University majoring in accounting at the Faculty of Commerce, co-founder of the Egyptian Soviet Chamber of Commerce (1989), the main founder and first Chairman of the Canada Egypt Business Council (2001–2003). He is also the main founder and Chairman of Abdurrahman Badawi Center for Creativity (2008-), a member of the Egyptian Romanian Friendship Association (1988–1991), member of the Arab Scientific Transportation Association (1989-) and a member of the Egyptian International Economic Forum (2003-).
- Gawdat Bahgat is a professor of political science at the National Defense University, Washington, D.C. and has published numerous articles and books on Persian Gulf and Caspian Sea region, terrorism, and geopolitics.
- Sameh Fahmi was Egypt's former oil minister. He graduated with a BSc in chemical engineering from Cairo University in 1973.
- Youssef Boutros Ghali was a politician and was Egypt's former minister of finance.
- Hani Mahfouz Helal was the Egyptian Minister of Higher Education and State Minister for Scientific Research and the former Cultural and Scientific Chancellor in the Egyptian embassy in Paris. Dr. Helal graduated from the Faculty of Engineering at Cairo University in 1974.
- Ahmed Nazif was the Egyptian Prime Minister and former Minister for Communications and Information Technology. Prof. Dr. Nazif graduated with a bachelor's degree in 1973 and a master's degree in 1976, from the Communications and Electronics Department, Faculty of Engineering, Cairo University.
- Moain Sadeq, competed a BA in Islamic archaeology in 1979

== 1980s ==
- Ezzat el Kamhawi is an Egyptian novelist. He graduated from the department of journalism in the Faculty of Mass Communications, Cairo University in 1983. In December 2012, el Kamhawi was awarded the Naguib Mahfouz Medal for Literature for his novel House of the Wolf.
- Mustafa al'Absi is a professor of behavioural medicine and neuroscience at the University of Minnesota Medical School. He was born in Yemen. He received his undergraduate psychology degree from Cairo University in 1985. He also received doctoral training in biological and clinical psychology at the University of Oklahoma. He currently directs multiple behavioural medicine research programs. He has received several honorary awards, including the Herbert Weiner Early Career Award and the Neal E. Miller Young Investigator Award. He has published more than 80 scientific articles, chapters, and edited books. He served as an editor or on editorial boards of multiple journals. He has also assumed leadership positions in several national and international organizations.
- Taher Elgamal is a cryptographer and inventor of the Elgamal crypto algorithm. He received his BS in electrical engineering from Cairo University in 1977, and his MS and PhD in computer science from Stanford University in 1984. He served as chief scientist at Netscape Communications from 1995 to 1998.
- Rafik Habib (born 1959; graduated from the Faculty of Arts, Psychology section, 1982), Christian (Coptic) Egyptian researcher, activist, author, and politician.
- Tarek Kamel is the Minister of Communication and Information Technology since 2005. Dr. Kamel obtained a bachelor's degree in 1985 and a master's degree in 1988 from the Communications and Electronics Department, Faculty of Engineering, Cairo University.
- Mahmoud Mohieldin the Minister of Investment in Egypt.
- Jehan Sadat was the second wife of Anwar Sadat and served as first lady of Egypt from 1970 until Sadat's assassination in 1981. She is a Senior Fellow at the University of Maryland, College Park and won the Pearl S. Buck award in 2001. She earned her BA (1977), MA (1980) and PhD (1986) degrees from Cairo University.
- Nasr Hamid Abu Zayd (1943–2010) was an Egyptian academic and civil rights activist. He earned his PhD in Arabic and Islamic studies from Cairo University in 1981. He opposed the use of Islam for political ends in his 1992 book Naqd al-khitab al-dini (Critique of Religious Discourse). As a result, a Cairo court forced him to divorce his wife, Cairo University faculty member Ibtihal Yunis in 1995. After 1996, he and his wife fled Egypt and settled in The Netherlands, where he worked at State University of Leiden.
- Magd Abdel Wahab is a Belgian academic, researcher, author and Imam of Islam. He is full professor and chair of applied mechanics at Ghent University, Belgium, where he is also the Head of Finite Element Modelling Research Group of Laboratory Soete.
- Baher Abdulhai is a civil engineer, academic, entrepreneur, and researcher. He is a professor in the Department of Civil Engineering, Director of Intelligent Transportation Systems Centre, and co-director of iCity Centre for Automated and Transformative Transportation at the University of Toronto. He is also the CEO and managing director of IntelliCAN Transportation System Inc.
- Samy Fawzy (graduated 1985) is an engineer who became an Anglican bishop, serving as bishop of Egypt and archbishop of Alexandria.

== 1990s ==
- Hussein Bassir is an Egyptian archaeologist and novelist. In 1994, he got his BA in Egyptology from Cairo University. Then he travelled to the United States to get his PhD in Egyptology and Near Eastern Studies from the Johns Hopkins University in Baltimore, Maryland.
- Essam Heggy is a prominent planetary scientist in the NASA Mars Exploration Program and staff scientist at the Institut de Physique du Globe de Paris. He graduated from the faculty of sciences at the Cairo University in 1997 and received the PhD degree from Paris VI University in 2002. He received several international awards for his role in contributing to the development low frequency terrestrial and planetary radars for subsurface exploration. He is currently a scientist at the Lunar and Planetary Institute in Houston, Texas, United States, where he also serves on a number of NASA panels. Heggy has earned a wide reputation among Egyptian youth after his resignation in 2005 from his staff position at the Cairo University to protest against the marginalization of science and youth in the Egyptian society. Rosa al Youssef, the widely distributed magazine in the Arab world, in its annual report in 2006, selected him as one of the top 10 reformists in Egypt.

== 2000s ==
- Abdulla Ghanim Almuhannadi, journalist, editor, and Qatari businessman
- George Messiha, pharmaceutical studies, politician

== See also ==
- Cairo University
- List of Egyptians
