= British debate over veils =

Islamic clothing debate in Britain

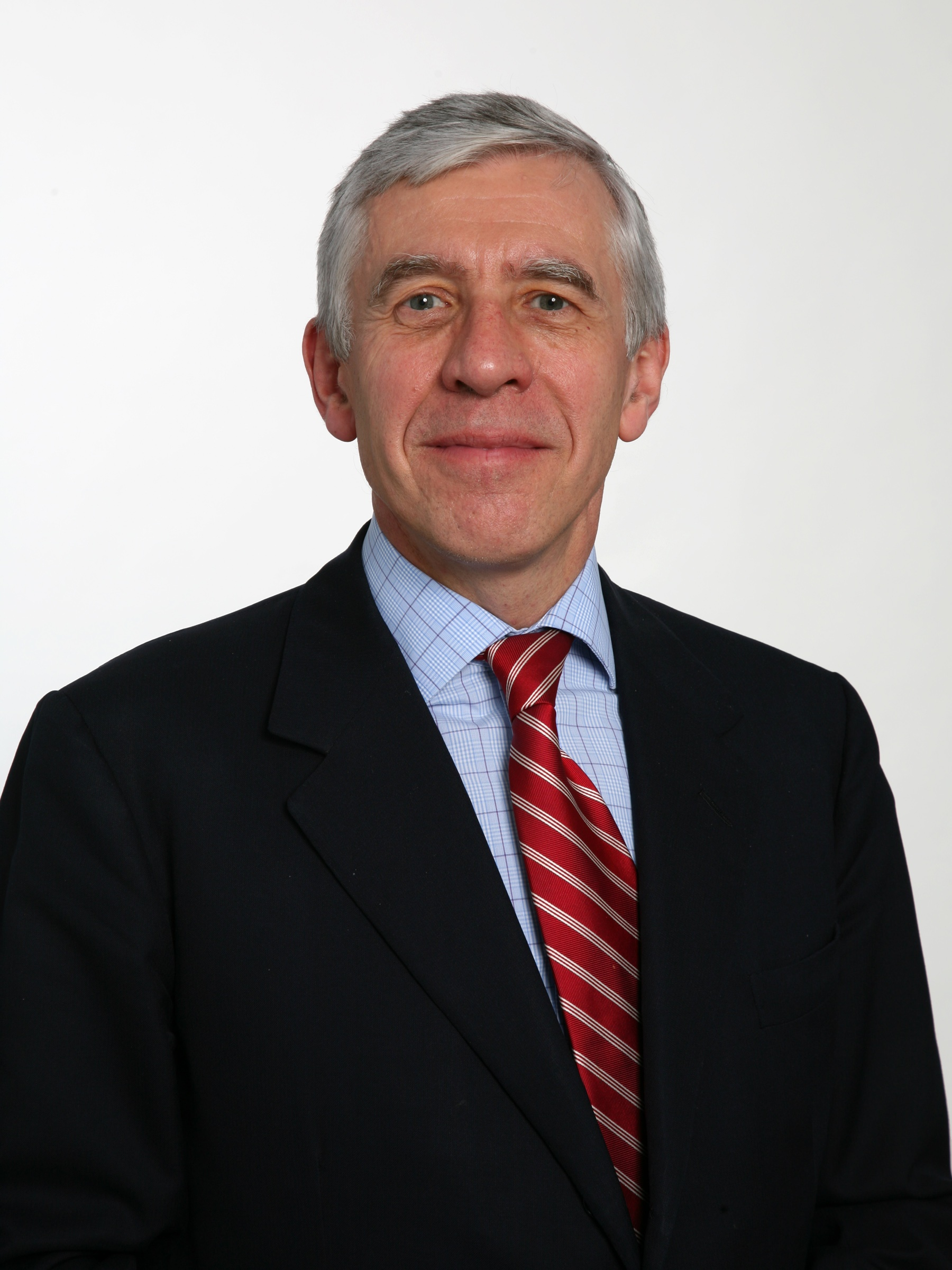
Comments by then-Leader of the House of Commons Jack Straw in 2006 began the British debate on veils.

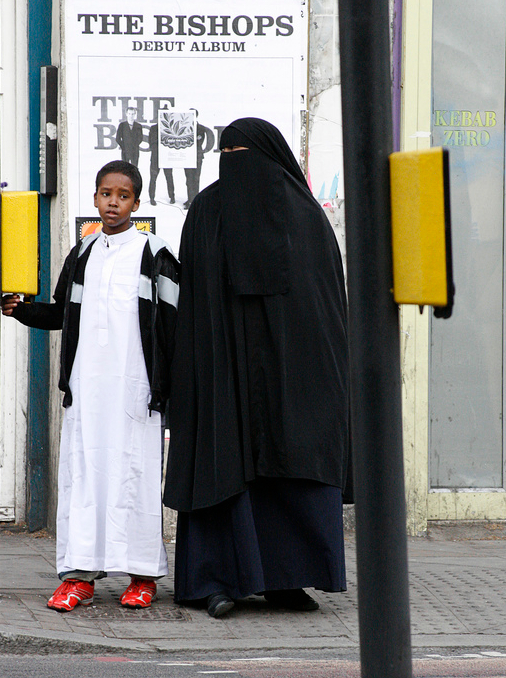
A woman in a niqab in England.

Europe burqa bans. Map current as of 2025 National ban – country bans women from wearing full-face veils in public Local ban – cities or regions ban full-face veils Partial ban – government bans full-face veils in some locations

The British debate over veils began in October 2006 when the MP and government minister Jack Straw wrote in his local newspaper, the Lancashire Evening Telegraph, that, while he did not want to be "prescriptive", he preferred talking to women who did not wear a niqāb (face veil) as he could see their face, and asked women who were wearing such items to remove them when they spoke to him, making clear that they could decline his request and that a female member of staff was in the room.

== Description ==
Straw said he told the newspaper this information to open a debate on the subject, and not because of the upcoming deputy leader election in the Labour Party. Straw was Foreign Secretary at the time of the Iraq War and since 1979 had been the Member of Parliament for the constituency of Blackburn, where at least one quarter of the population are Muslim. Straw later stated that he would like to see the veil "abolished" altogether, adding that he was worried about "implications of separateness".

Straw's views were met with a mixed response, with some agreeing to the idea of a debate, some arguing that Muslim women should not wear veils in the United Kingdom, and some, such as the newspaper the Daily Express, calling for the veil to be banned. Others were opposed to Straw's intervention, and some accused him of encouraging prejudice.

In 2010, Jack Straw publicly apologised over his 2006 comments, stating "If I had realised the scale of publicity that they [his comments] received in October 2006, I wouldn’t have made them and I am sorry that it has caused problems and I offer that apology."

== Background ==
One of the tenets of Islam is a requirement for modesty in both men and women. This concept is known in Arabic as hijab, which refers to far more than Islam and clothing. The word "hijab" has entered English and other European languages with a somewhat different meaning, referring either to sartorial hijab, or to one article thereof, namely the headscarf worn by many Muslim women.

Muslims follow various schools of thought (madhhabs) which have differences of opinions on Islamic law (sharia). Women who wear a face-veil tend to observe the hadiths (sayings of Muhammad) instructing women to cover all that is not essential, which some interpret as everything except the eyes and hands. This belief is a minority position. Most Muslims believe women should allow their faces to be visible, but should cover the hair (and, in many cultures, the throat as well). An even smaller minority wear all-covering garments such as the burqa. These rulings (fatwa) are based on the understandings of modesty and the public display of the body (awrah).

== Expressions of opposition to the wearing of the niqab ==
Following Straw's comments, support came from fellow Labour members, the then-opposition Conservatives, right-wing national press and others.

Tony Blair, then Labour Prime Minister, described veils as a "mark of separation", and Gordon Brown, then Chancellor of the Exchequer, agreed with this approach, adding that he thought it would be "better for Britain" if fewer Muslim women wore the veil, and that he supports "what Jack Straw has said".

Labour MP Nigel Griffiths, then Deputy Leader of the Commons, said "it's all very well for Muslim women to say that they feel comfortable wearing the veil but ... the veil does not make other people feel comfortable. In that way it could be said that they are being selfish." Phil Woolas, another Labour MP, who had a position in charge of race relations policy, said that Muslim women wearing the veil are "frightening and intimidating" and congratulated Straw for starting the debate.

The Shadow Home Secretary, David Davis of the Conservatives, suggested that Muslims were responsible for white flight, adding that the Parliament may be "inadvertently encouraging a kind of voluntary apartheid". Bill Deedes, a former Conservative Party politician, added his weight to the debate in an opinion piece in The Daily Telegraph, saying that Islam "is the only faith on Earth that persuades its followers to seek political power and impose a law – sharia – which shapes everyone's style of life", and that Islam "forbids" Muslims from conforming with British society.

Simon Jenkins wrote a piece for The Sunday Times asking why Muslim women who wore the veil wanted to live in the UK; however, he cast doubt on the effectiveness of Straw's statements.

Speaking to The Jewish Chronicle, French philosopher Bernard-Henri Lévy asserted that "the veil is an invitation to rape" because, as philosopher Emmanuel Lévinas said, "[having seen] the naked face of your interlocutor, you cannot kill him or her, you cannot rape him, you cannot violate him."

In August 2018, Boris Johnson was criticised for a column that he had written in the Daily Telegraph. As part of an article arguing that burqa bans like the one introduced in Denmark were wrong, as women should be free to wear what they want, Johnson nevertheless said that Muslim women who wore burqas "look like letter boxes" and compared them to "bank robbers". In response to the piece, the Muslim Council of Britain accused Johnson of "pandering to the far right", while the Labour MP Jess Phillips said she would report Johnson to the Equality and Human Rights Commission. The Chairman of the Conservative Party, Brandon Lewis, called on Johnson to apologise for his remarks. The Conservative peer Baroness Warsi accused Johnson of indulging in "dog whistle" politics and called for disciplinary action if he did not apologise. The Conservative MP Nadine Dorries, however, said that Johnson "did not go far enough" and it was the Government which should be apologising. Dorries said the burqa should have no place in Britain and it was "shameful that countries like France and Denmark are way ahead of us on this".

In the aftermath of the Johnson article, Emily Thornberry, the Shadow Secretary of State for Foreign and Commonwealth Affairs for the Labour Party, said about British Muslim women who decide to dress in the niqab, "I wouldn’t want my four year old looked after by somebody wearing a burka."

=== Opposition by political parties ===
The UK Independence Party (UKIP) has had a policy to ban full-facial coverings since 2010, while the British National Party (BNP) favoured banning it only in schools. In 2014, UKIP clarified their stance, favouring only a ban at schools and places where security is a concern, while the BNP are now in favour of a total ban.

Britain First and Restore Britain supports a ban on full-facial coverings.

== Opposition to raising of the issue ==
Opposition to the debate mainly came from left and far-left politicians, parties and newspapers, but also from some Conservative politicians.

Ken Livingstone, then the Labour Mayor of London, said that he was "amazed by his [Straw's] insensitivity", adding that "bearing in mind this person [the constituent] has come to you to ask for something, the power imbalance in that relationship means it’s completely unacceptable behaviour on Jack Straw’s part. That a powerful man can say to a completely powerless woman, I think you should take your veil off, I think is completely and utterly wrong and insensitive." The socialist Respect Party urged Straw to resign. "Who does Jack Straw think he is to tell his female constituents that he would prefer they disrobe before they meet him," George Galloway said in a press release. "For that is what this amounts to. It is a male politician telling women to wear less." The Socialist Workers Party said that Straw's words allowed for an "open season for all who want to blame Muslims for the problems in Britain and to blame the victims of racism for the racism in society".

Writing in The Guardian, Madeleine Bunting claimed that Straw's "singling out" of Muslim women actually intensifies the division that Straw says he wants to remove.

Daniel Hannan, prominent Conservative MEP and columnist for The Daily Telegraph, stated that "clothing ought not to be a matter for the courts." He also pointed out that other highly offensive pieces of clothing (to him) such as Adolf Hitler T-shirts, Che Guevara T-shirts, and Osama bin Laden T-shirts are inherently considered legal due to freedom of expression. Baroness Warsi, a Muslim Conservative peer and cabinet minister, has defended women's right to wear the burka. She has said, "Just because a woman wears the burka, it doesn't mean she can't engage in everyday life. If women don't have a choice they are oppressed." She has also said, "There are women who wear the burka who run successful internet businesses which don't require you there face to face." Minister of State for Immigration Damian Green has labelled a ban on face-coverings as "un-British" and "undesirable" for a "tolerant and mutually respectful society" like the U.K.

== Opposition to the tone of the debate ==
- John Denham MP said that the debate was "flawed" as the government appeared to be "grandstanding" for the sake of the majority rather than actually listening to the Muslim minority.
- Trevor Phillips, the chairman of the Commission for Racial Equality, said "I think it's right for him to say 'would you mind not making me feel uncomfortable' in this case, as long as it is clearly understood the answer to that can be 'no'." He later followed up these comments by saying that he feared that the debate "could be the trigger for the grim spiral that produced riots in the north of England five years ago". He said that the debate "seems to have turned into something really quite ugly", adding, "we need to have this conversation but there are rules by which we have the conversation which don't involve this kind of targeting and frankly bullying."
- A number of individuals, including India Knight, George Galloway and Ken Livingstone, compared the plight of Jews in 1930s Britain with that of contemporary British Muslims, especially in light of the 70th anniversary of the Battle of Cable Street.
- Peter Oborne spoke out at length about the debate: "New Labour has given up on the Muslim vote after the Iraq war, so it's now bashing Muslims to get back the white working-class vote and the veil row is a very carefully orchestrated political strategy."
- Yasmin Alibhai-Brown's book Refusing the Veil (2014, ISBN 978-1-84954-750-5), argues that veiling conceals abuse. It is a passionate treaties against what she—as a Muslim, feminist and liberal—considers being submission to a misogynistic symbol of women's inferiority. "The veil," she argues, "in all its permutations, is indefensible and unacceptable."

== Accusations of Islamophobia ==
- Nazir Ahmed, Baron Ahmed, the first Muslim peer in the House of Lords, accused the Government of sustaining "a constant theme of demonising" the Muslim community. Lord Ahmed told BBC Radio 4's Sunday programme that it had become fashionable amongst ministers to "have a go at the Muslims".
- Pola Uddin, Baroness Uddin, the first female Muslim peer in the House of Lords, said that "we have attacked those who would be our greatest allies in meeting the current challenges of terrorism and radicalisation." She warned that the row over veils had caused "havoc" in the Muslim community and created "a feeling of vulnerability and demonisation of Muslim women".
- On 21 October 2006 the Stop the War Coalition and the Muslim Council of Britain organized a rally called "Unite Against Islamophobia" which was to take place in George Square in Glasgow; the coalition also issued an open letter against Islamophobia. Around 300 people attended the event.
- A group calling itself the British Muslim Initiative called for a rally to defend religious freedom and demand an end to attacks on Muslims to take place on 20 November 2006 at Westminster Central Hall.
- The playwright David Edgar wrote in The Guardian that he was "shocked" at the levels of anti-Islamic prejudices that came to the fore during the debate, writing "the furor over the right to wear the veil has exposed the double standards of the liberal anti-Islam agenda".
- After Salman Rushdie gave his opinion that the veil "sucks", the former leader of the Muslim Council of Britain, Iqbal Sacranie, said "Islamophobes are currently doing all they can to attack Islam and it doesn't surprise me he is now jumping on the bandwagon."

== Violent attacks ==
Muslim groups blamed Straw's comments in part for an arson attack on an Islamic centre in the Scottish town of Falkirk and an attack on a woman wearing a niqab.

== Media spoof ==
The Daily Star was prevented from publishing a mock-up page of what it would look like if it was run by Muslims. The mock-up "Daily Fatwa", which promised a "Page 3 Burkha Babes Special" and competitions to "Burn a Flag and Win a Corsa" and "Win hooks just like Hamza's", was prepared to run as page 6 in that day's edition until members of the National Union of Journalists refused to co-operate on the grounds that it was deliberately offensive to Muslims.

Zoo Magazine instead announced plans to publish a double-page spread making fun of Muslim law. The section will be labelled "Your all-new veil-friendly Zoo!", while other headlines include "Public stonings!", "Beheadings!" and "Absolutely nobody having any fun whatsoever". The magazine, which regularly features naked women will, on these pages, instead feature a woman in a burqa, with the heading "A girl! As you've never seen her before!".

== Opinion polling ==
Ipsos MORI conducted a more thorough opinion poll on 11 October 2006. This found that 51% of the public agreed (saying they "strongly agree" or "tend to agree") that Straw was right to raise the issue, with 31% saying he was wrong. It also found 61% agreed with the statement: "By wearing a veil Muslim women are segregating themselves". However, 51% of the public thought that Straw's comments would damage race relations, and 77% agreed that "Muslim women should have the right to wear the veil".

In July 2010, YouGov conducted a poll of 2,205 adults in Britain, it found that 67% supported a complete ban on wearing the Burka across Britain.

A further YouGov poll, in August 2016, suggested 57% of British people favoured banning the burka in public, with 25% being against such a ban.

In 2018, following Boris Johnson's comments on the Burka, Sky found that 59% agreed that a Burka ban should be put in place, with 26% being against a ban.

== Foreign commentary on the UK debate ==
Speaking of the British debate, Fox News correspondent John Gibson said the veil "is clearly a sign of separation, clearly a sign of wanting to avoid assimilating in the western culture, whether it's here or Britain or Italy. And it is clearly a sign of a subculture that wants to establish its own rules separate and apart. Speaking as an American: no Sharia law, no veils. If you're here, be American," a remark which prompted the Council on American-Islamic Relations to encourage people to complain about Gibson's remarks.

== Parliamentary debate ==
A private member's bill titled "Face Coverings (Regulation) Bill 2010–11", sponsored by Conservative MP Philip Hollobone was scheduled to be debated in the UK Parliament on 20 January 2012, during a Second Reading debate. The bill would make it an offence to wear a face covering in certain public and private venues in the UK.

== Further cases ==
=== The veil in schools ===
Daily Express cover for 21 October 2006.

The debate was compounded when Aishah Azmi was sacked from a Church of England school after refusing to remove her niqab in front of the small children she had been hired to teach. She had not mentioned this condition at her job interview, at which she had not worn a niqab. She took her case to an employment tribunal, which saw, unusually, many British politicians commenting on it before it was heard. They included the Prime Minister, Tony Blair, who said he supported the school's actions, and race relations minister Phil Woolas, who said she should be "sacked". Azmi lost her case for unfair dismissal but intends on appealing the decision to a higher court.

On 20 March 2007, new guidance was given to schools in England that they will be able to ban pupils from wearing full-face veils on security, safety or learning grounds. Massoud Shadjareh, chairman of the Islamic Human Rights Commission, said successive ministers had failed to give proper guidance about schools' obligations regarding religious dress and "to now proceed to issue guidance against Muslim communities is simply shocking".

Birmingham Metropolitan College, with a large Muslim enrolment, banned all face coverings for security reasons in September 2013, a decision supported by Prime Minister David Cameron. Union activism had the ban overturned. Several newspapers claimed that private Islamic schools in Tower Hamlets, Southall and Lancaster force pupils to wear face veils when they are outside the school buildings. The three schools in question clearly denied this. However, their school uniforms contain headscarfs and the jilbab, a long gown. The former Mayor of London and former Prime Minister, Boris Johnson, opposes having children wearing veils.

=== The veil in crime ===
Veils have been accused of hindering the fight against crime:

- Mustaf Jama, wanted for the murder of policewoman Sharon Beshenivsky, is speculated by several newspapers to have dressed in a niqab in order to flee Britain, though the Home Office said the claim was unlikely to be true as women can be asked to lift veils in identity checks.
- Mohammed Ahmed Mohamed wanted on terrorism charges dressed in a burqa, which covers the body and face entirely, in order to escape the police. He fled to join Al Shabab in Somalia, who later executed him.
- The male terrorists responsible for the 21 July 2005 London bombings fled disguised in burqas.
- White male criminals robbed the London department store Selfridges in burqas in June 2013.

=== The veil and identification at national borders ===
Conservative politician Douglas Hogg asked minister Liam Byrne what instructions had been given to officers at borders in dealing with people wearing veils or other garments obscuring their identity. Byrne stated that in accordance with the Immigration Act 1971 all persons arriving in the United Kingdom must satisfy an immigration officer as to their nationality and identity. Where there are sensitive or cultural reasons why it is not possible for a person to remove a veil or other garment at the immigration control, they will be taken to a private area where a female officer will ask them to lift their veil so that their identity can be verified. There are powers to refuse entry to persons who cannot be satisfactorily identified.

=== The veil in court ===
In November 2006, The Times reported that a judge adjourned a court case and took advice after lawyer Shabnam Mughal twice declined to remove her niqab. Judge George Glossop requested that she do so as he was struggling to hear her during the hearing.

In August 2013, a judge ordered an East London Muslim woman to remove her veil during her trial. However, in September, a compromise was reached that she would only have to do so while giving evidence. The judge, Peter Murphy, said "the niqab has become the elephant in the courtroom".

== See also ==
- Islamic dress in Europe
- Burka by country
- Criticism of Islam
- Criticism of multiculturalism
