= Messiha =

Messiha is a surname. Notable people with the surname include:

- George Messiha (born 1982), Egyptian politician
- Jean Messiha (born 1970), Egyptian-born French political advisor

== See also ==
- Messina (name)
