= Burqa by country =

Countries with burqa bans as of 2026. Ban in public places Full or partial ban in some localities Ban on sale and manufacturing Ban in some public buildings or in the public workplace

The burqa, an all-enveloping outer garment which completely covers the body and the face, and the niqab, a similar garment that leaves the eyes uncovered, are worn by some Muslim women in various countries. Some countries have banned wearing these garments in government offices, schools, or in public places and streets.

There are currently 24 states that have banned the burqa and niqab, both Muslim-majority countries and non-Muslim countries, including:

- Africa: Cameroon, Chad, the Republic of the Congo, Gabon, Senegal, Tunisia, Zambia
- Asia: China, Kazakhstan, Kyrgyzstan, Sri Lanka, Tajikistan, Turkmenistan, Uzbekistan
- Europe: Austria, Belgium, Bulgaria, Denmark, France, Italy, Luxembourg, the Netherlands, Switzerland, Portugal

== Europe ==
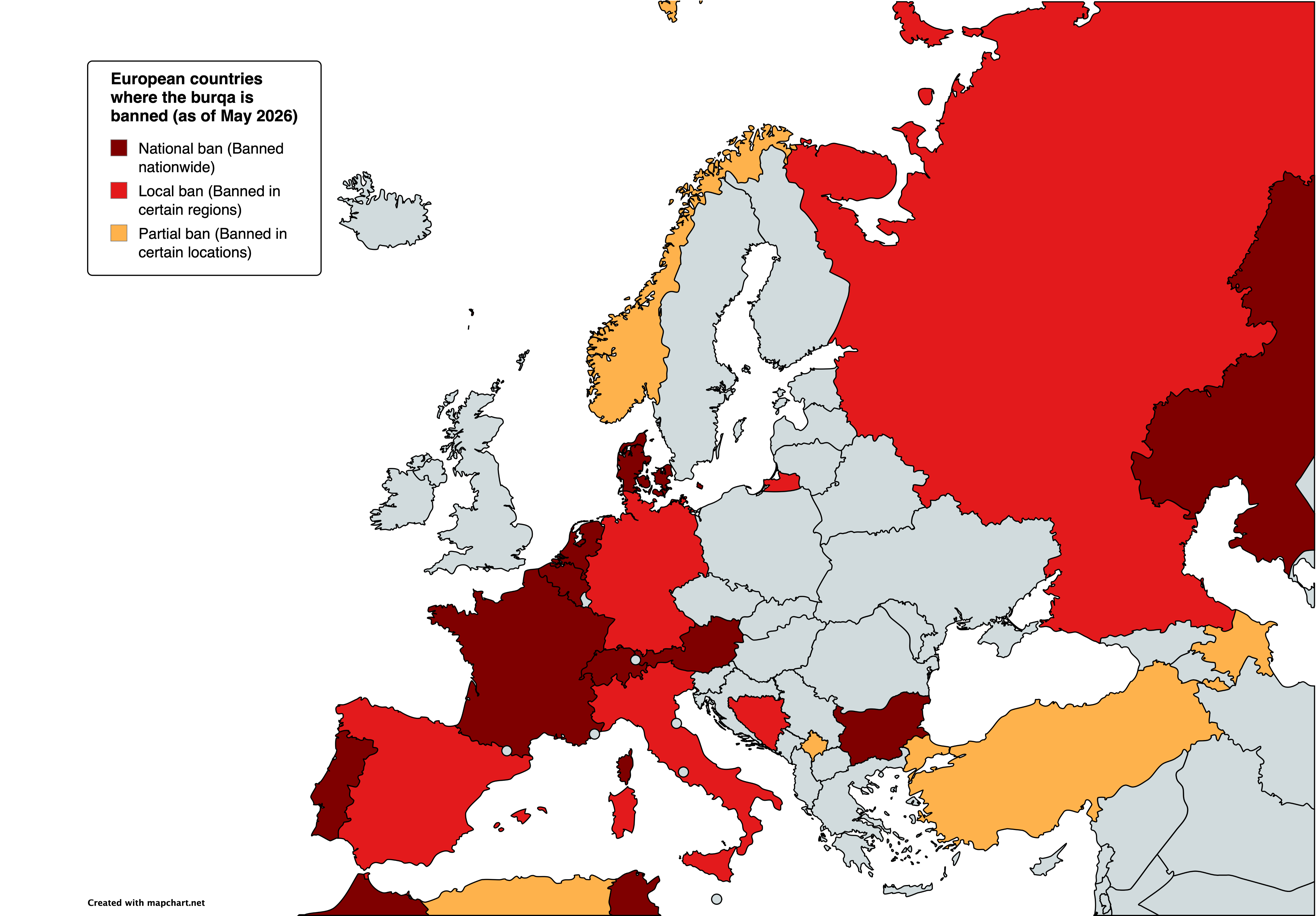
European burqa bans as of 2026 National ban – country bans people from wearing full-face veils in public Local ban – cities or regions ban full-face veils Partial ban – government bans full-face veils in some locations

=== Austria ===
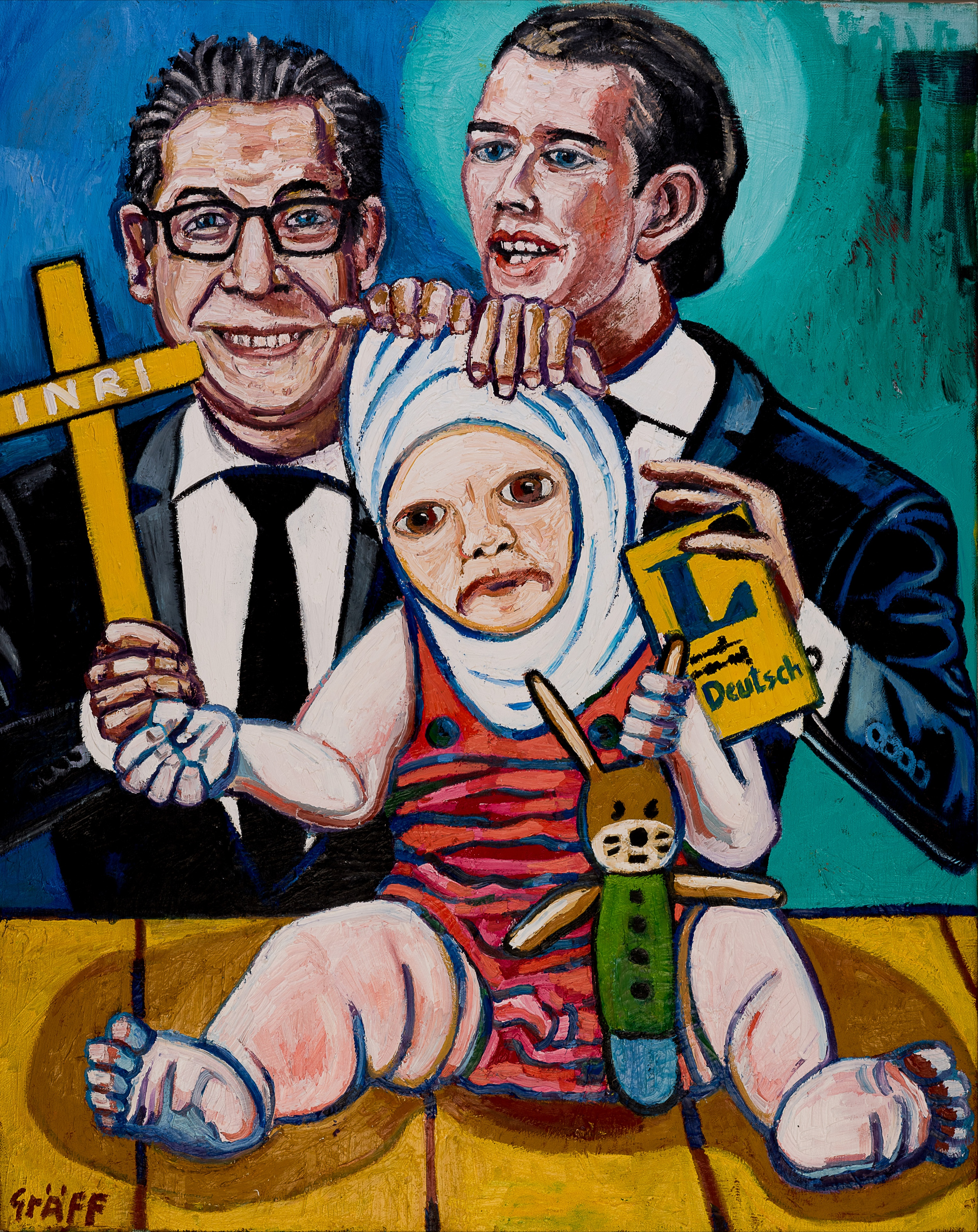
Liebende Eltern ('Loving Parents') by Matthias Laurenz Gräff (2018), a painting about the discussion of face-covering clothing, showing Austrian Chancellor Sebastian Kurz, Vice Chancellor Heinz-Christian Strache, and a Muslim child

In 2017, a legal ban on face-covering clothing was adopted by the Austrian parliament.

=== Belgium ===
As of 2015, Belgium has specific bans on face-covering dress, such as the niqab or burqa. On 11 July 2017, the European Court of Human Rights upheld Belgium's ban on burqas and full-face veils.

=== Bulgaria ===
In 2016, a ban on the wearing of face-covering clothing in public was adopted by the Bulgarian parliament. The Bulgarian parliament enacted the ban on the basis of security concerns, however the ban stimulated conflict as 10 percent of the country's population identifies as Muslim. Women who violate the burqa ban face fines up to €770 (~US$848) and have their social security benefits suspended.

=== Denmark ===
In autumn 2017, the Danish government considered adopting a law prohibiting people to wear "attire and clothing masking the face in such a way that it impairs recognizability". The proposal was met with support from the three largest political parties and was passed into law on 31 May 2018, becoming § 134 c of the Danish Penal Code, stating that "[a]ny person who in a public place wears a item of clothing that covers said person's face shall be liable to a fine" with an exception for coverings that serve "a creditable purpose" (e.g. sports equipment, protection against the cold, masks for carnivals, masquerades, etc.). The law came into force on 1 August 2018. On the first day of the implementation of the burqa ban, hundreds of protesters rallied wearing face veils in public. According to the ban, wearing a burqa or a niqab in public can lead to a fine of 1000 kroner (~US$156) in the case of first time offences, rising to 10,000 kr. (~US$1560) for a fourth offence. Under the ban, police are instructed to order women to remove their veils or to leave the public space. Police officers who fail to obey the orders of the ban are subject to fines.

=== France ===
France is a secular country. One of the key principles of the 1905 French law on the Separation of the Churches and the State is the freedom of religious exercise. At the same time, this law prohibited public servants from wearing any religious symbols during work.

In 1994, the French Ministry of Education sent out recommendations to teachers and headteachers to ban the Islamic veil (specified as hijab, niqab, and burka) in educational institutions. According to a 2019 study by the IZA Institute of Labor Economics, a higher proportion of girls of Muslim background born after 1980 graduated from high school, bringing their graduation rates closer to the non-Muslim female cohort. Having a "Muslim background" was defined as having an immigrant father from a predominantly Muslim country (hence, indigenized Muslims with a longer history in France were not considered), as the study was highlighting the "difficulties faced by adolescents with a foreign cultural background in forming their own identity". Males in the Muslim group also had a lower graduation rate than males in the non-Muslim group. While secularism is often criticized for restricting freedom of religion, the study concluded that for the French context, the "implementation of more restrictive policies in French public schools ended up promoting the educational empowerment of some of the most disadvantaged groups of female students".

In 2004, the French law on secularity and conspicuous religious symbols in schools banned most religious signs, including the hijab, from public primary and secondary schools in France. The proposed ban was extremely controversial, with both sides of the political spectrum being split on the issue, some people arguing that the law goes against religious freedom and is racist because it affects mostly Muslim women and Jewish men.

In 2010, a ban on face covering, targeting especially women wearing chador and burqa, was adopted by the French Parliament. According to The Guardian, the ban was challenged and taken to the European Court of Human Rights which upheld the law on 1 July 2014, accepting the argument of the French government that the law was based on "a certain idea of living together". In 2013 the applicant stood outside the Élysée Palace in niqab and subsequently received a criminal conviction. The French criminal courts noted in 2014 that the lower court was wrong to dismiss her rights covered under Article 18, but dismissed her appeal. The French delegation argued that wearing face coverings violated the principle of "living together". Judges Angelika Nussberger and Helena Jäderblom dissented, calling the concept "far-fetched and vague." Going on to note that the very decision of declaring what a woman is allowed to wear was hypocritical and antithetical to the aim of protecting human rights. The committee came to the determination in 2018 that the case had been incorrectly dismissed after review by a single judge on the grounds that, "the conditions of admissibility laid down in articles 34 and 35 of the Convention [had] not been met." Upon review the committee concluded that the applicants' human rights had been violated under article 18 and 26 of the International Covenant on Civil and Political Rights. The committee dismissed the notion of "living together" as a vague notion not protected under international law.

=== Italy ===
As of September 2026, Italy has no national ban for Burqa or niqab. A 1975 Law prohibits wearing helmets or garments that impede identification in public without justified reason, and a 2008 court ruling clarified that a full face coverings worn for religious or cultural reasons are permitted except for when identity verification is specifically required. In October 2025, the Italian government voted to ban the burqa and niqab in all public places. In September 2026, Prime Minister Giorgia Meloni announced that her government would introduce a measure banning Burqas and Niqabs specifically in schools, telling an event organised by the youth wing of her Brothers of Italy party that "in Italy no one, in the name of a real or supposed tradition, can decide that a young woman must hide herself." The announcement was made alongside a separate proposal to cap the number of foreign students permitted per school class and to require Italian-language lessons for parents of foreign students found to be struggling to integrate. As of the announcement, students who are nor Italian citizens made up 11.6% of enrolment in Italian schools, according to the research institution Fondazione ISMU.

=== Latvia ===
In 2016 The Independent reported that a legal ban of face-covering Islamic clothing was adopted by the Latvian parliament. After long public discussions draft legislation was approved by the Latvian government on 22 August 2017, however it was never adopted by the parliament as a law.

=== Netherlands ===
The States General of the Netherlands enacted a ban on face-covering clothing, popularly described as the "burqa ban", in January 2012. In 2018, the Netherlands implemented a partial burqa ban that prohibits wearing face-covering clothing, including burqas and niqabs, in specific public places such as government buildings, schools, and public transportation.

The burqa ban came into force on 1 August 2019 in schools, public transport, hospitals, and government buildings, but there are doubts over whether it will be applied in practice. Amsterdam Mayor Femke Halsema spoke out in her opposition to the law. She stated that removing someone wearing a burqa from public transport in the capital would not be fitting with current Dutch society. Chairman of the Dutch Public Transport Association, Pedro Peters, also voiced his opinion on the ban. Peters said: "You are not going to stop the bus for half an hour for someone wearing a burqa", waiting for the police to arrive; "we are also not allowed to refuse anyone because we have a transport obligation". Known officially as the Partial Ban on Face-Covering Clothing Act, the act also details that those who refuse to uncover their faces may pay a fine of at least €150 and can be arrested. Dutch police have also stated that enforcing the ban is not a priority, and that they likely would not respond to a complaint within a thirty-minute timeframe.

=== Norway ===
In 2018 the Norwegian parliament voted to ban the burqa in schools and universities.

=== Portugal ===
On 17 October 2025 the parliament of Portugal approved a ban on face veils for "gender or religious" reasons and making it punishable by up to €2000.

The bill, promoted by the right wing Chega party and backed by the governing centre-right Social Democratic Party, was enacted into law by president António José Seguro on 19 August 2026. Violators face a fine of €150 to €3000.

=== Russia ===
In July 2024, the niqab and other full-face veils were temporarily banned in the Muslim-majority republic of Dagestan by the Muftiate, an Islamic authority. The ban followed the 2024 Dagestan attacks, where reports said one attacker planned to use the niqab as a disguise to escape.

=== Spain ===
In February 2026, the conservative Vox party, with the support of the People's Party, pushed through parliament a bill to criminalize full-face veils. The left-wing coalition opposed it, considering it to have racist undertones. They PSOE subsequently planned to push through their own banning measures.

Seville and Cantabria joined the prohibition since March 2026.

=== Sweden ===
In December 2019, the municipality of Skurup banned Islamic veils in educational institutions. Earlier, in May 2019, the municipality of Staffanstorp approved a similar ban. On 17 November 2020, the Administrative Courts in Malmö and Lund determined that both municipalities' decisions to prohibit headscarves, niqabs, and burqas in preschools and primary schools violated the constitutional right to freedom of religion and the European Convention on Human Rights. Both municipalities appealed, but on 23 June 2021, the Administrative Court of Appeal in Gothenburg upheld the initial rulings on the same grounds. On 8 December 2022, the Supreme Administrative Court overturned both bans, with Justice Ulrik von Essen stating that "in order for the restriction to be permissible, it must be supported by law" and that "legal support is lacking in national law and therefore the municipalities' decisions should be overturned".

On 12 October 2025, Christian Democrats (KD) leader and Deputy Prime Minister Ebba Busch proposed a nationwide ban on burqas and niqabs in public places such as streets, squares, shopping centres, and healthcare facilities. Education and Integration Minister and Leader of the Liberals Simona Mohamsson expressed support for stronger measures against religious oppression, including forced veiling, but did not explicitly endorse Busch's proposal, and neither did any other party in the Tidö Government.

=== Switzerland ===
In a referendum on 7 March 2021, Swiss voters approved a nationwide ban on the burqa, with over 51% of the electorate supporting it.

Earlier, in September 2013, a constitutional referendum in the Canton of Ticino on a popular initiative banning full-face veils was approved with 66.2% of the vote. In May 2017, the Landsgemeinde in the Canton of Glarus rejected adopting a similar measure with about two-thirds of the vote. In September 2018, the Canton of St Gallen became the second canton in Switzerland to vote in favour of a ban on facial coverings in public, with two-thirds casting a ballot in favor.

== Muslim world ==
=== Algeria ===
In 2018, the government passed a law banning the wearing of full face-veils, called burqas or niqabs, for female public servants while at work. The Prime Minister at the time, Ahmed Ouyahia, pushed the ban because of his belief that women should be identifiable in the workspace.

=== Egypt ===
Gamal Abdel Nasser laughing at the Muslim Brotherhood for suggesting in 1953 that women should be required to wear the hijab

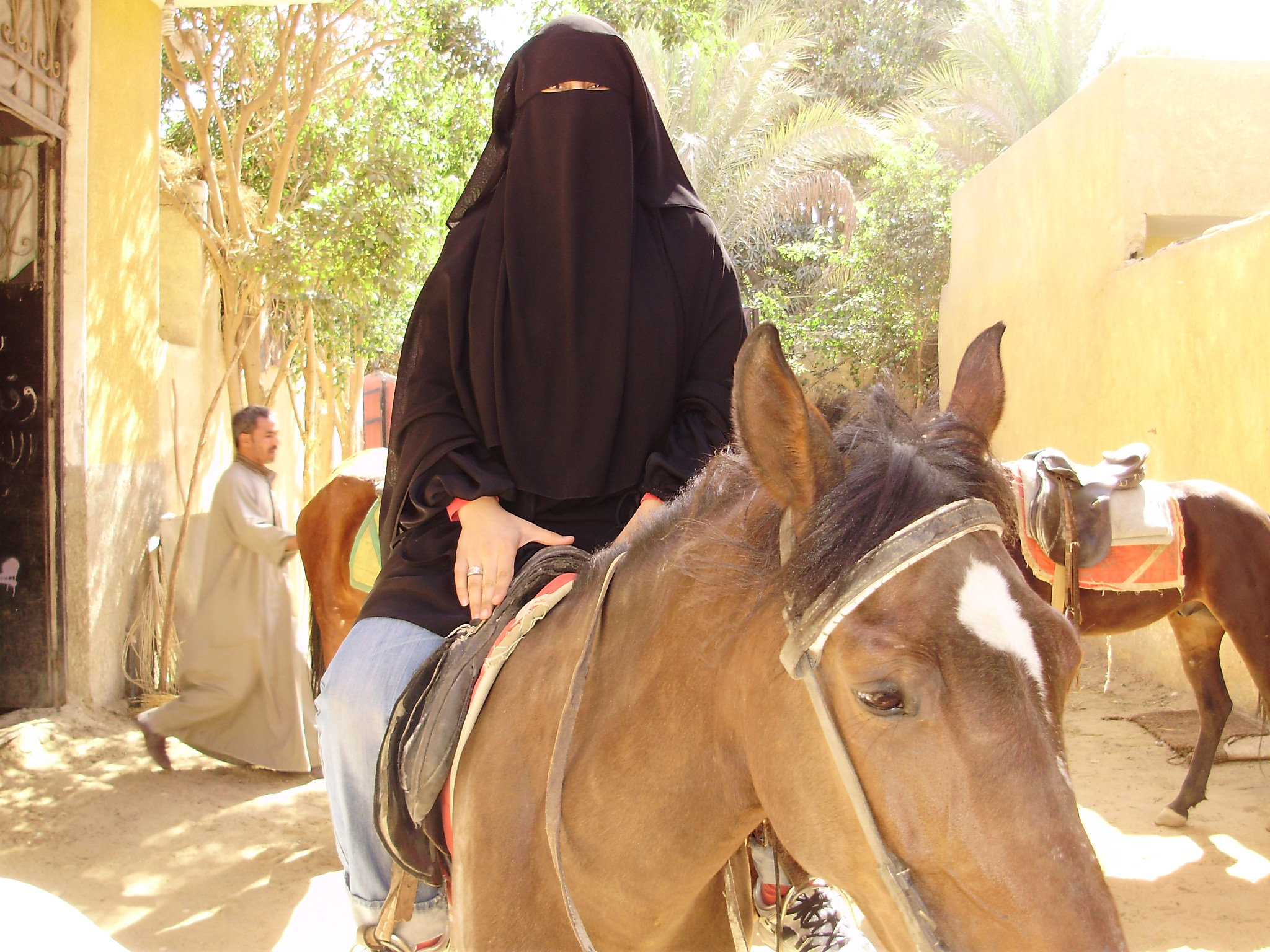
Woman wearing a niqab in Egypt

In 1953, Egyptian leader President Gamal Abdel Nasser was told by the leader of the Muslim Brotherhood that they wanted to enforce the wearing of the hijab, to which Nasser responded: "Sir, I know you have a daughter in college – and she doesn't wear a headscarf or anything! Why don't you make her wear the headscarf? So you can't make one girl, your own daughter, wear it, and yet you want me to go and make ten million women wear it?".

The veil gradually disappeared in the following decades, so much so that by 1958, an article by the United Press (UP) stated that "the veil is unknown here." However, the veil has had a resurgence since the Iranian Revolution, concomitant with the global revival of Muslim piety. According to The New York Times, as of 2007, about 90 percent of Egyptian women currently wear a headscarf.

A small number of women wear the niqab. The secular government does not encourage women to wear it, fearing it will present an Islamic extremist political opposition. In the country, it is negatively associated with Salafist political activism. There have been some restrictions on wearing the hijab by the government, which views it as a political symbol. In 2002, two presenters were excluded from a state-run TV station for deciding to wear hijab on national television. The American University in Cairo, Cairo University, and Helwan University attempted to forbid entry to niqab wearers in 2004 and 2007.

Muhammad Sayyid Tantawy, Grand Imam of al-Azhar, issued a fatwa in October 2009 arguing that veiling of the face is not required under Islam. He had reportedly asked a student to take off her niqab when he spotted her in a classroom, and he told her that the niqab is a cultural tradition without Islamic importance. Government bans on wearing the niqab on college campuses at the University of Cairo and during university exams in 2009 were overturned later. Minister Hany Mahfouz Helal met protests by some human rights and Islamic groups.

=== Kazakhstan ===
On 1 July 2025, Kazakhstan officially banned the Burqa and Niqab.

=== Kyrgyzstan ===
On 27 December 2024, Kyrgyzstan's parliament specifically approved a ban on wearing the niqab, a full-face Islamic veil, in public places. The government justified the measure by arguing that the niqab was not part of traditional Kyrgyz culture and claimed it was necessary to protect national identity and security.

On 22 January 2025, President Sadyr Zhaparov signed the law "On Amendments to a Number of Legislative Religious Acts of the Kyrgyz Republic," officially enforcing the ban. The law, which was also posted on his official website, prohibited clothing that obscures a person's face, except in cases related to work requirements or medical reasons. Additional provisions included bans on coercing individuals to change their religious beliefs, conducting religious rituals in state institutions like nursing homes, prisons, and military units, and distributing religious literature in public places, schools, or door-to-door. A week later, on 1 February, the niqab ban formally came into effect, imposing a fine of 20,000 soms (approximately $230) for violations. The government also emphasized that the measure was intended to improve public safety by ensuring better identification of individuals in public spaces and government institutions.

=== Morocco ===
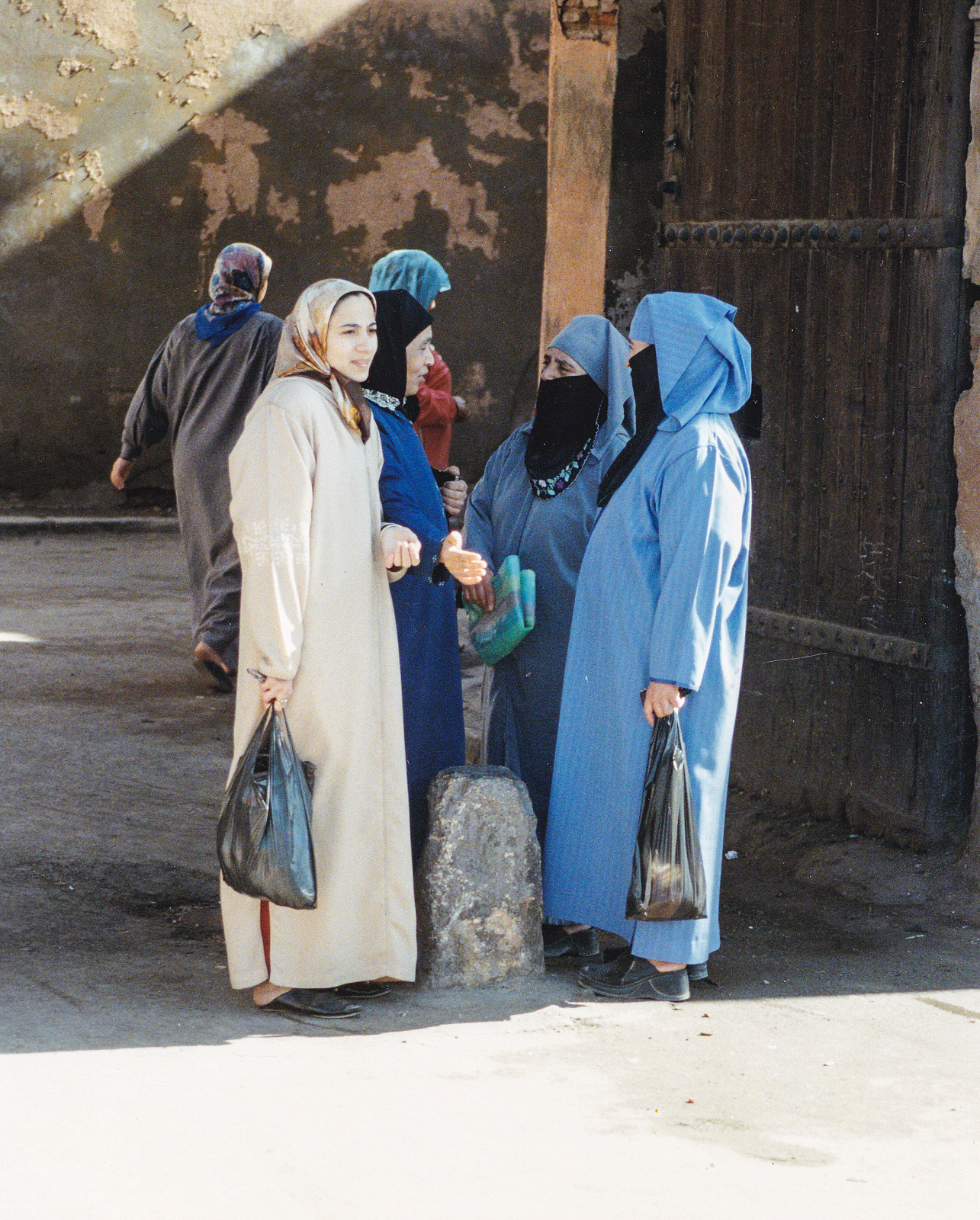
A group of Moroccan women wearing headscarves and veils

In Morocco, the headscarf is not forbidden by law, and women are free to choose to wear one. The headscarf is more frequent in the northern regions, small to medium cities, and rural regions. As it is not totally widespread, wearing a hijab is considered rather a religious decision. In 2005, a schoolbook for basic religious education was heavily criticized for picturing female children with headscarves, and later the picture of the little girl with the Islamic headscarf was removed from the school books. The headscarf is strongly and implicitly forbidden in Morocco's military and the police.

In January 2017 Morocco banned the manufacturing, marketing and sale of the Afghan burqa, however, this does not apply to other types of niqab.

=== Syria ===
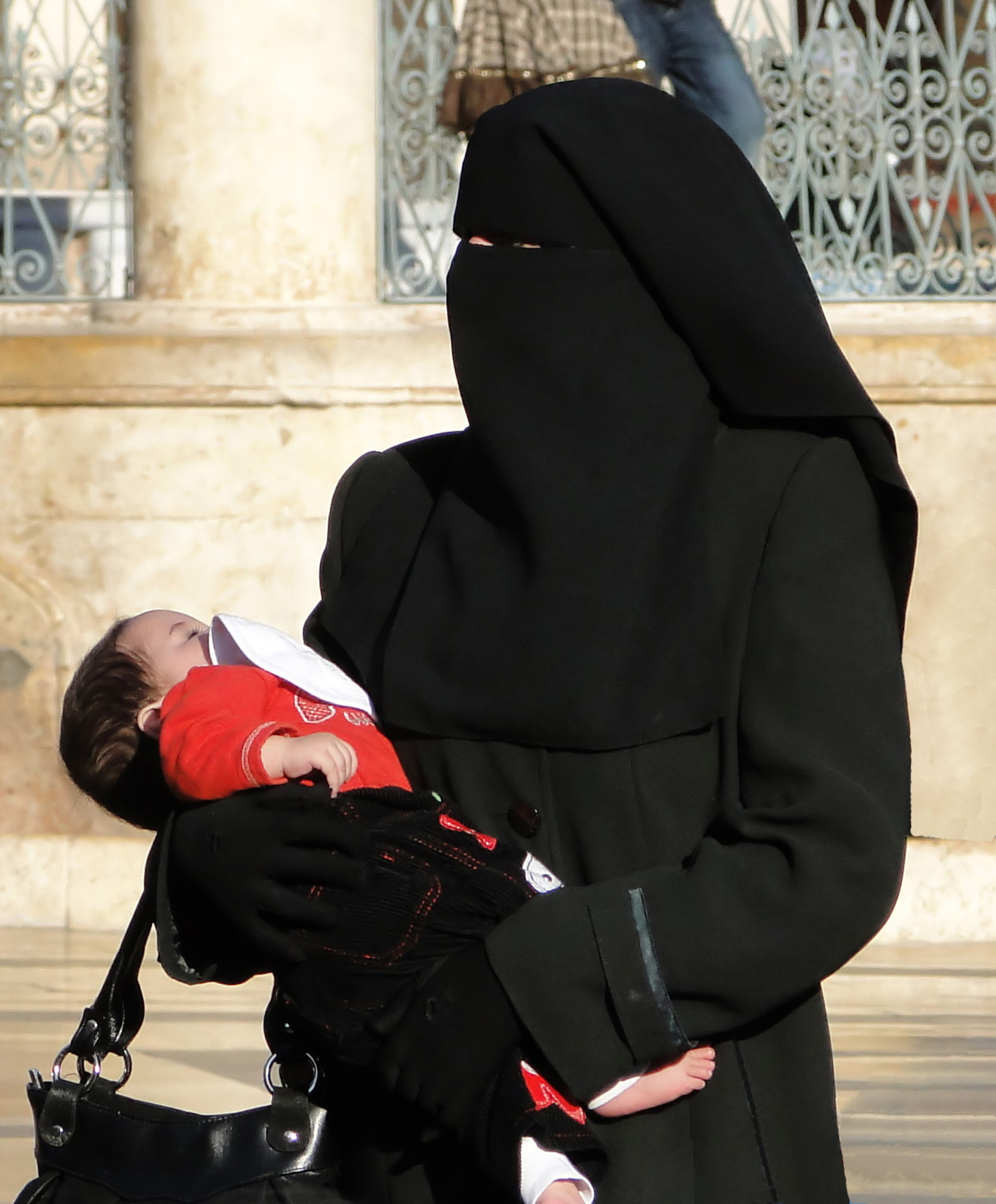
Woman in niqab in Aleppo, Syria

In 2010, Ghiyath Barakat, Syria's minister of higher education, announced a ban on women wearing full-face veils at universities. The official stated that the face veils ran counter to secular and academic principles of Syria. However, the ban strictly addresses veils that cover the head and mouth, and does not include hijabs, or headscarfs, which most Syrian women wear.

=== Tajikistan ===
In 2017, the government of Tajikistan passed a law requiring people to "stick to traditional national clothes and culture", which has been widely seen as an attempt to prevent women from wearing Islamic clothing, in particular the style of headscarf wrapped under the chin, in contrast to the traditional Tajik headscarf tied behind the head.

=== Tunisia ===
On 6 July 2019, the government banned the wearing of the niqab in public institutions, citing security reasons.

=== Uzbekistan ===
Uzbekistan lifted its ban on wearing hijabs in public places in 2021, allowing greater religious expression. However, in September 2023, the government imposed a ban on wearing face-covering garments like the burqa in specific public spaces for security reasons. Additionally, authorities enforced restrictions on wearing beards and hijabs in schools, requiring female students to remove headscarves before entering educational institutions. These actions reflect the government's evolving stance on religious attire.

== Africa ==
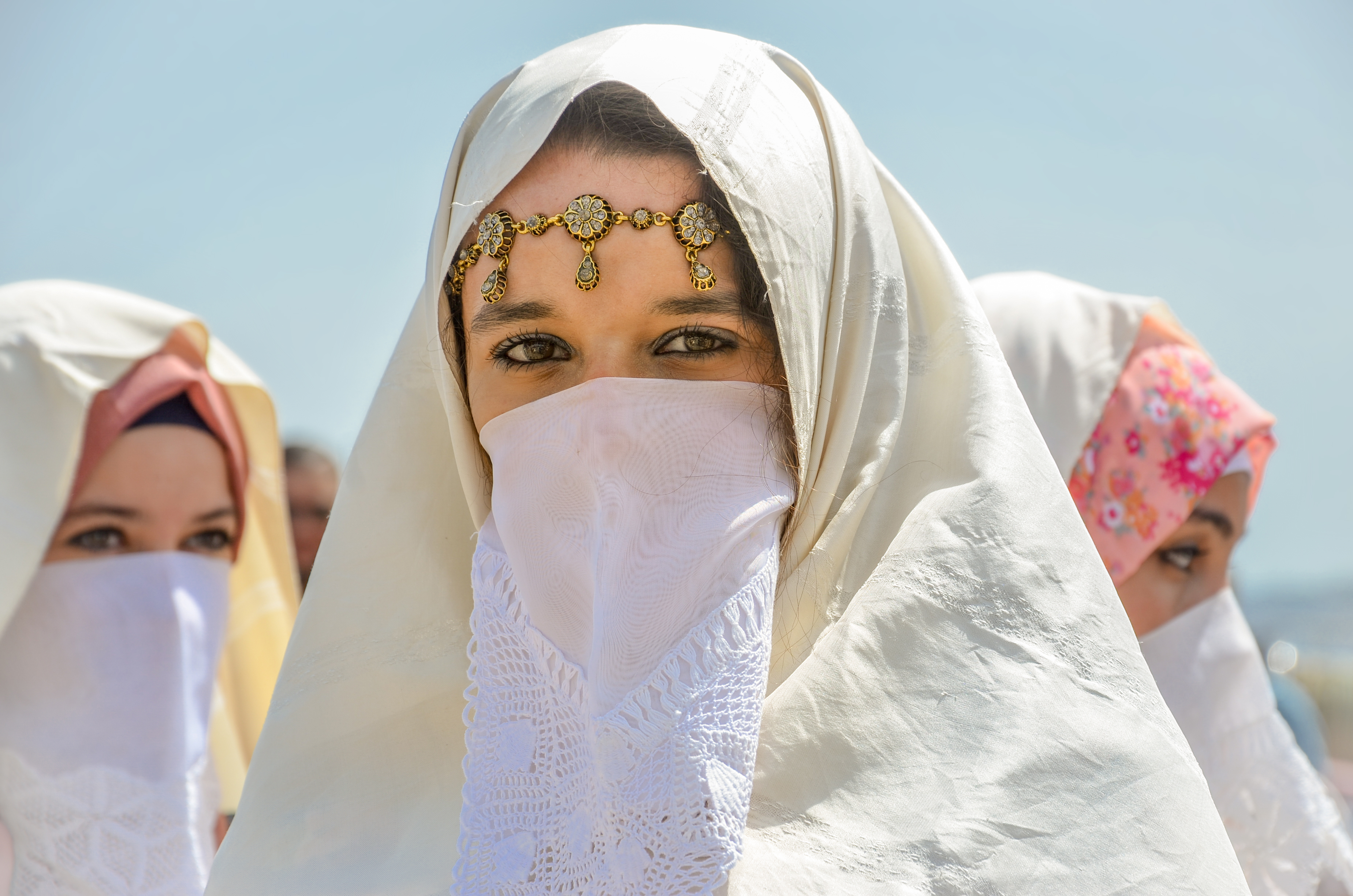
Women in Algeria wearing a haïk, a type of veil

=== Cameroon ===
On 12 July 2015, two female suicide bombers dressed in burqas blew themselves up in Fotokol, Far North Region, killing 13 people. Following the attacks, since 16 July, Cameroon banned the wearing of full-face veils, including the burqa, in the Far North. Governor Midjiyawa Bakari of the mainly Muslim region said the measure was to prevent further attacks.

=== Chad ===
Following a two suicide bombings on 15 June 2015, which killed 33 people in N'Djamena, the government announced on 16 June 2015 the banning of the wearing of the burqa in its territory for security reasons. The 2015 prime minister, Kalzeubet Pahimi Deubet, called the burqa "camouflage". Women who violate this ban are subject to jail time.

=== Gabon ===
On 15 July 2015, Gabon announced a ban on the wearing of full-face veils in public and places of work in response to the Fotokol bombings.

=== Republic of the Congo ===
The full-face veil was banned in May 2015 in public places in the Republic of the Congo to "counter terrorism", although there has not been an Islamist attack in the country.

== Asia-Pacific ==
=== Australia ===
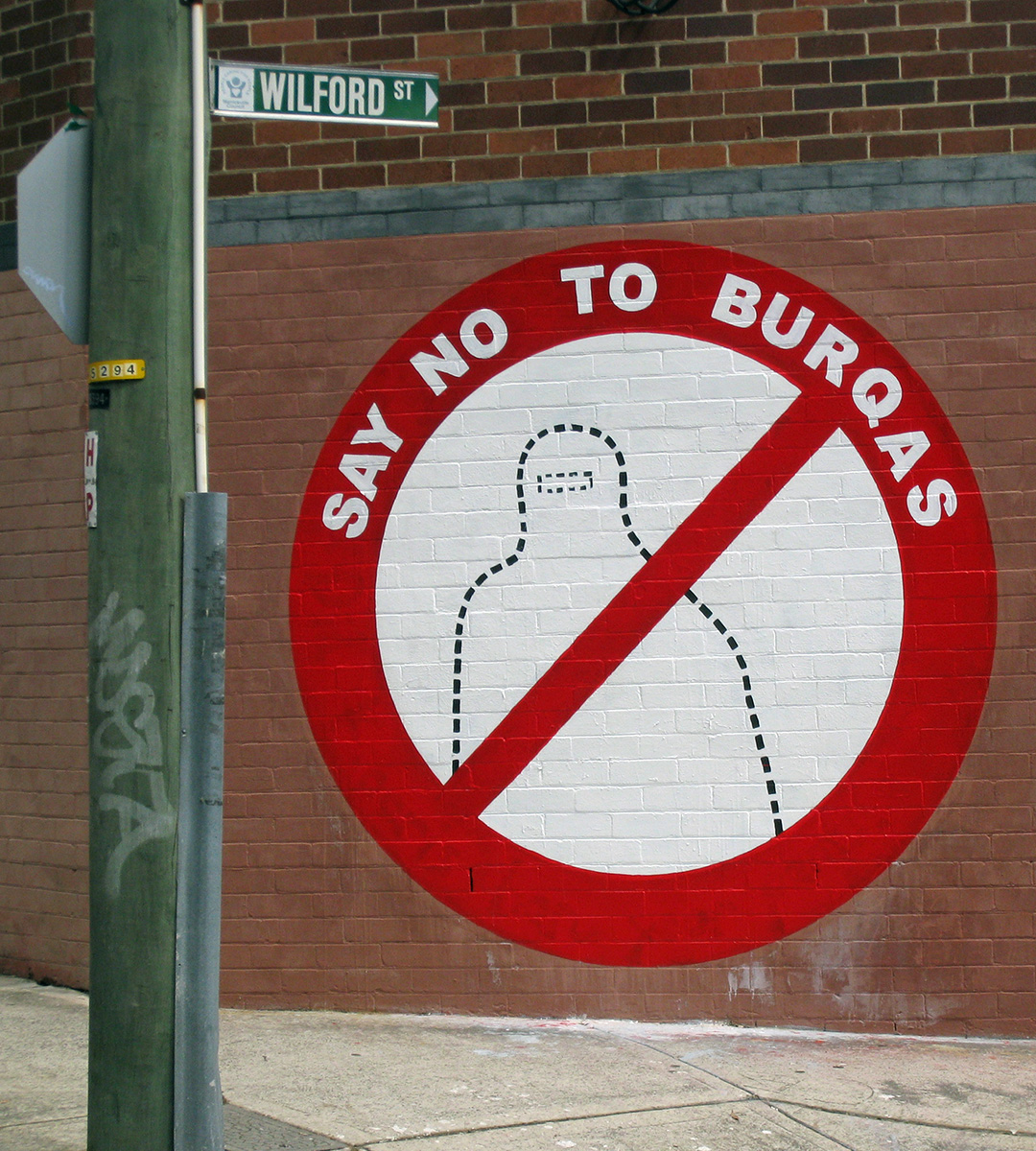
Say no to burqas mural in Newtown, New South Wales

In September 2011, Australia's most populous state, New South Wales, passed the Identification Legislation Amendment Act 2011 to require a person to remove a face covering if asked by a state official. The law is viewed as a response to a court case of 2011 where a woman in Sydney was convicted of falsely claiming that a traffic policeman had tried to remove her niqab.

The debate in Australia is more about when and where face coverings may legitimately be restricted. In a Western Australian case in July 2010, a woman sought to give evidence in court wearing a niqab. The request was refused on the basis that the jury needs to see the face of the person giving evidence.

=== China ===
In 2017, China banned the burqa in the region of Xinjiang.

=== India ===
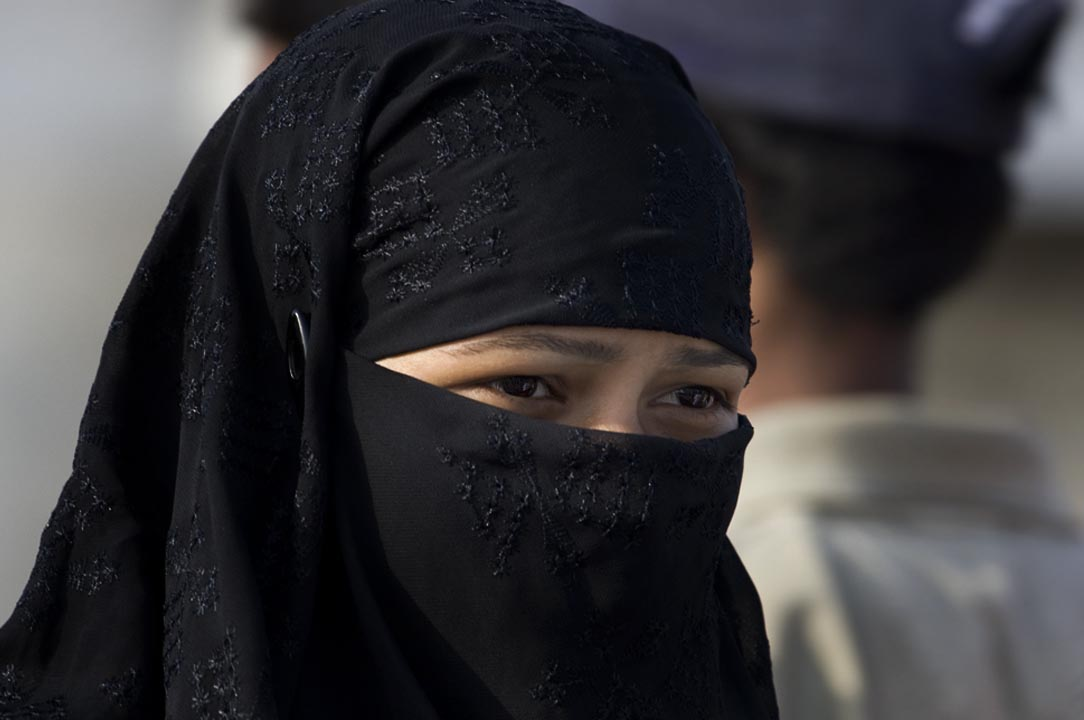
A Muslim woman wearing a niqab in India

In India, Muslim women are allowed to wear the hijab and burqa anytime, anywhere. However, in April 2019, Shiv Sena party member Sanjay Raut called for the burqa to be banned.

In February 2020, Uttar Pradesh's labor minister Raghuraj Singh called for an outright ban on women wearing burqas, suggesting that terrorists have been using them to elude authorities.

In January 2022, some students in Karnataka asked for special rights to wear the burqa even when educational institutes have a pre-decided rule of wearing uniforms. On 15 March 2022, through a verdict, the Karnataka High Court upheld the hijab ban in educational institutions as a non-essential part of Islam and suggested that wearing hijabs can be restricted in government colleges where uniforms are prescribed and ruled that "prescription of a school uniform" is a "reasonable restriction".

=== Myanmar ===
At a conference in Yangon held by the Organization for the Protection of Race and Religion on 21 June 2015, a group of monks declared that the headscarves "were not in line with school discipline", and recommended that the Burmese government ban the wearing of hijabs by Muslim schoolgirls and ban the butchering of animals on the Eid holiday.

=== Sri Lanka ===
A Sri Lankan MP called for both the burqa and niqab to be banned from the country in wake of the Easter terror attack which happened on 21 April 2019 during a local parliamentary session.

The Sri Lankan government temporarily banned all types of clothing covering the face, including the burqa and niqab, on 29 April 2019.

The Ban has been removed at present.

== North America ==
=== Canada ===
On 12 December 2011, the Canadian Minister of Citizenship and Immigration issued a decree banning the niqab or any other face-covering garments for women swearing their oath of citizenship; the hijab was not affected. This edict was later overturned by a Court of Appeal on the grounds of being unlawful.

In October 2017, Bill 62, a Quebec ban on face covering, made headlines. As of July 2018, the ban has been suspended by at least two judges for violating the Canadian Charter of Rights and Freedoms. It was first suspended in December 2017.

With regards to public opinion, a 27 October 2017 Ipsos poll found that 76% of Quebecers backed Bill 62, with 24% opposing it. The same survey found the 68% of Canadians in general supported a law similar to Bill 62 in their part of Canada. A 27 October Angus Reid Institute poll found that 70% Canadians outside of Quebec supported "legislation similar to Bill 62" where they lived in the country, with 30% opposing it.

As of June 2019, wearing religious symbols is prohibited for certain public servants in positions of authority in Québec: police, judges and teachers.

People such as Tarek Fatah and Ensaf Haidar have called on the burqa to be banned.

In 2017 the mayor of Quebec City, Régis Labeaume, said he supports legislation banning the wearing of the niqab or burqa in public spaces. A 2017 Canadian poll found that 54% supported banning the burqa.

== Ban chronology ==
The table below lists, in chronological order, states that are either United Nations (UN) members or have UN observer status that have completely banned the burqa.

Year banned	Countries	Countries per year	Cumulative countries
2010	France	1	1
2011	Belgium	1	2
2015	Bulgaria; Cameroon; Chad; Congo; Gabon	5	7
2017	Austria; China; Tajikistan	3	10
2018	Denmark; Luxembourg	2	12
2019	Netherlands; Sri Lanka; Tunisia	3	15
2021	Switzerland	1	16
2023	Uzbekistan	1	17
2025	Kazakhstan; Kyrgyzstan; Senegal; Turkmenistan; Portugal	5	22

== See also ==
- Women in Islam
- Islam in Europe
- Islamic dress in Europe
- Clothing laws by country
- Headscarf controversy in Turkey
- Hijab controversy in Quebec
- Multiculturalism
- Hijab by country
