= Hijab and burqa controversies in Europe =

Hijab and burqa controversies in Europe revolve around public reactions and opposition to the variety of headdresses worn by Muslim women, which have become prominent symbols of the presence of Islam in especially Western Europe. Although Muslim communities have long existed in parts of Eastern Europe, particularly the Balkans, the Muslim populations of Western Europe are largely the result of more recent immigration. For many Muslim women, garments such as the hijab (an Arabic term meaning "to cover") and niqab are regarded as religious obligations grounded in Islamic scripture and law. In several European countries, the wearing of these garments has led to political controversies and proposals for legal restrictions, ranging from partial to full bans. Some countries already have laws banning the wearing of masks in public, which can be applied to veils that conceal the face. Other countries are debating similar legislation, or have more limited prohibitions. Some of them apply only to face-covering clothing such as the burqa, boushiya, or niqab; some apply to any clothing with an Islamic religious symbolism such as the khimar, a type of headscarf. The issue has different names in different countries, and "the veil" or hijab may be used as general terms for the debate, representing more than just the veil itself, or the concept of modesty embodied in Hijab.

== Perspectives ==
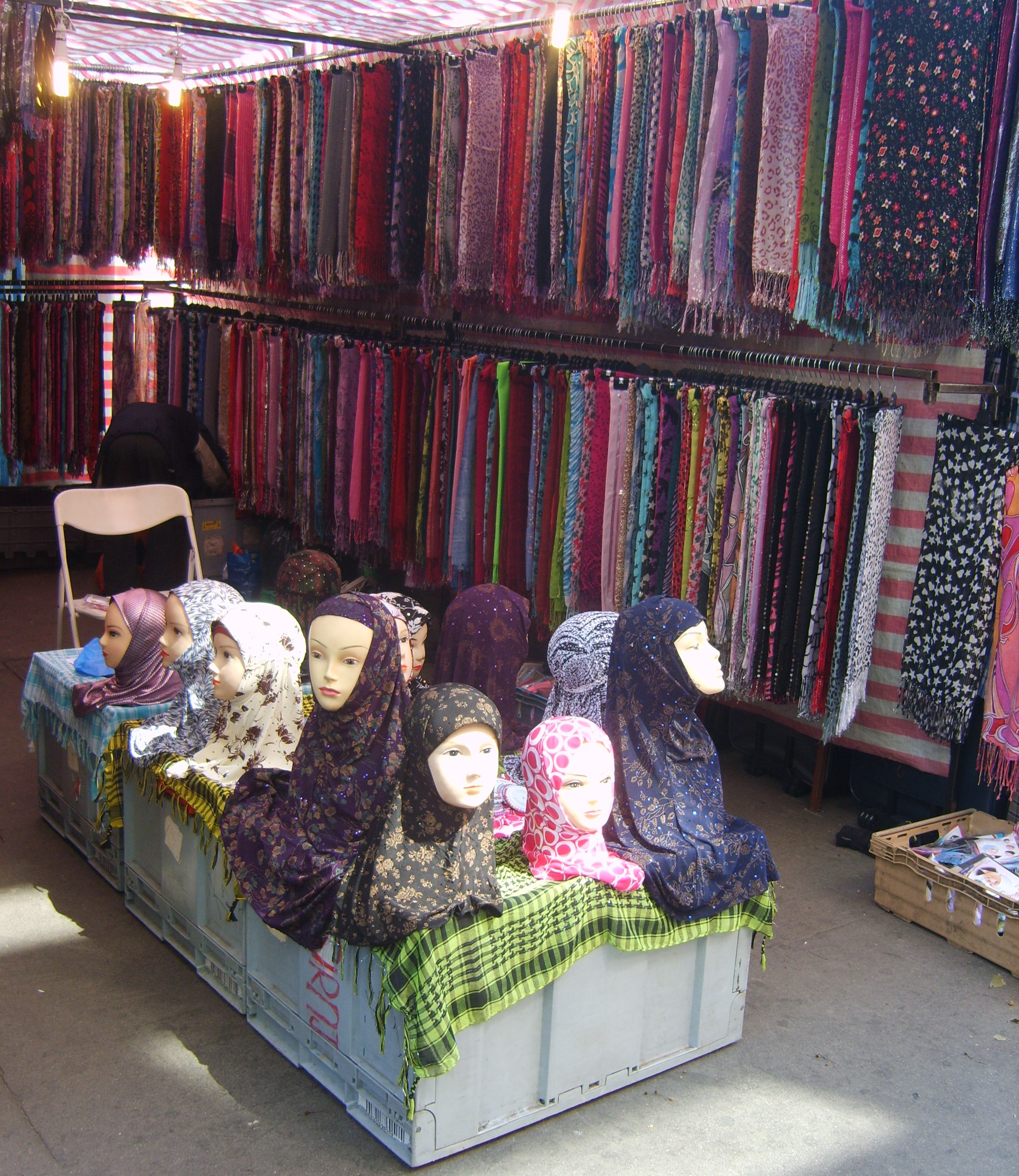
Headscarves for sale at Whitechapel market in London, E1

A range of perspectives, including Muslim views of hijab as an expression of faith and autonomy, as well as secular and feminist concerns, have shaped public debate over Islamic dress in Europe. However, some scholars argue the broader controversy reflects underlying tensions within European societies over religious diversity, secularism, and national identity, with debates about Islamic dress often serving as proxies for wider anxieties about immigration and cultural change. Security concerns, especially related to counterterrorism, are commonly cited to justify bans on face-covering clothing. Some policies and proposals merely include Islamic headdresses into the entire spectrum of religious symbols, also including the crucifix, Christian head covering, the kippah, the mitpaḥat or tichel and other clothes and accessories, that some argue should be absent in certain places on the basis of secularism in order to establish religiously neutral spaces so that everyone receives the same treatment, and to prevent social conflicts. Other policies and proposals specifically target the hijab, burka, and similar Islamic headdresses based on claims that they are oppressive to the women wearing them. Many hijab- and burka-wearing women, as well as Muslim feminist scholars, emphasize that Islamic dress represents autonomy, religious obligation, and dignity, challenging claims that it is inherently oppressive. Other arguments focus on their perceived "un-Europeanness" and other such territorial or nationalistic concerns.

For some critics, Islamic dress is an issue of value conflicts and the clash of civilizations. These critics—prominent among them, Ayaan Hirsi Ali—see Islam as incompatible with Western values, at least in its present form. They advocate the values of Enlightenment liberalism, including secularism and equality of women. For them, the burqa or chador is both a symbol of religious obscurantism and the oppression of women. In their view, Western Enlightenment values require prohibition, regardless of whether a woman has freely chosen Islamic dress. A more extreme related view is that freely chosen Islamic dress is a declaration of allegiance to radical Islamism.

Scholars such as anthropologist Saba Mahmood have argued that liberal-secular restrictions on Islamic dress reflect a culturally specific understanding of religion. In Politics of Piety, Saba writes that secularism in the modern West often rests on a Protestant-derived notion of religion as primarily a matter of private belief, which marginalizes religious practices that are embodied and enacted in public, such as veiling in Islam. From this perspective, bans on garments like the hijab or niqab do not reflect religious neutrality, but instead impose a culturally specific and largely post-Christian ideal of modesty and autonomy, undermining the very liberal principles of freedom and equality they claim to uphold.

France is often cited as a prominent example of this tension. Journalist Iman Amrani, writing in The Guardian, argues that bans on Islamic clothing, such as the 2016 municipal burkini bans, demonstrate a selective and coercive interpretation of secularism. While laïcité is officially presented as a principle of civic equality, Iman contends that it is frequently applied in ways that single out Muslim women and restrict public expressions of Islamic faith. In her view, these measures contradict France’s own commitment to freedom of expression and reflect broader patterns of surveillance and marginalization of Muslim communities.

While some European officials opposed blanket bans on Islamic dress—such as European Commissioner Franco Frattini, who in 2006 stated that he did not favor banning the burqa—other political leaders expressed stronger criticisms. In the same year, British Prime Minister Tony Blair described Islamic dress as a "mark of separation". Campaigns to ban the burka have also been linked to the counter-jihad movement, and proposals for restrictions have sometimes coincided with broader cultural prohibitions, as Dutch politician Geert Wilders proposed bans not only on hijabs but also on Islamic schools, new mosques, and non-Western immigration.

== Jurisprudence ==
In France and Turkey, the emphasis is on the secular nature of the state, and the symbolic nature of the Islamic dress, and bans apply at state institutions (courts, civil service) and in state-funded education (in France, while the law forbidding the veil applies to students attending publicly funded primary schools and high schools, it does not refer to universities; applicable legislation grants them freedom of expression as long as public order is preserved). These bans also cover Islamic headscarves, which in some other countries are seen as less controversial, although law court staff in the Netherlands are also forbidden to wear Islamic headscarves on grounds of state neutrality. A less politicized argument is that in specific professions (teaching), a ban on "veils" (niqab) is justified since face-to-face communication and eye contact are required. This argument has featured prominently in judgments in Britain and the Netherlands after students or teachers were banned from wearing face-covering clothing. The public and political response to such prohibition proposals is complex since by definition they mean that the government decides on individual clothing. Some non-Muslims, who would not be affected by a ban, see it as an issue of civil liberties as a slippery slope leading to further restrictions on private life. A public opinion poll in London showed that 75 percent of Londoners support "the right of all persons to dress following their religious beliefs". In a more recent poll in the United Kingdom by Pew Research Center, 62% said they would approve of a ban on full veils (covering everything but the eyes). The same poll showed support by majorities in France (82%), Germany (71%) and Spain (59%).

The 2010 French law against covering the face in public, known as the "Burqa ban", was challenged and taken to the European Court of Human Rights which upheld the law on 1 July 2014, accepting the argument of the French government that the law was based on "a certain idea of living together", the ECtHR concluded the ban was not disproportionate.

Employers in the EU may restrict the wearing of religious symbols if such regulations on appearance are applied consistently, according to a March 2017 ruling by the European Court of Justice in a case involving two Belgian women. On 15 July 2021, the European Court of Justice confirmed this ruling in another case involving two German women who were suspended from their jobs for wearing a headscarf. The Court stated: "A prohibition on wearing any visible form of expression of political, philosophical or religious beliefs in the workplace may be justified by the employer's need to present a neutral image towards customers or to prevent social disputes."

== National laws ==
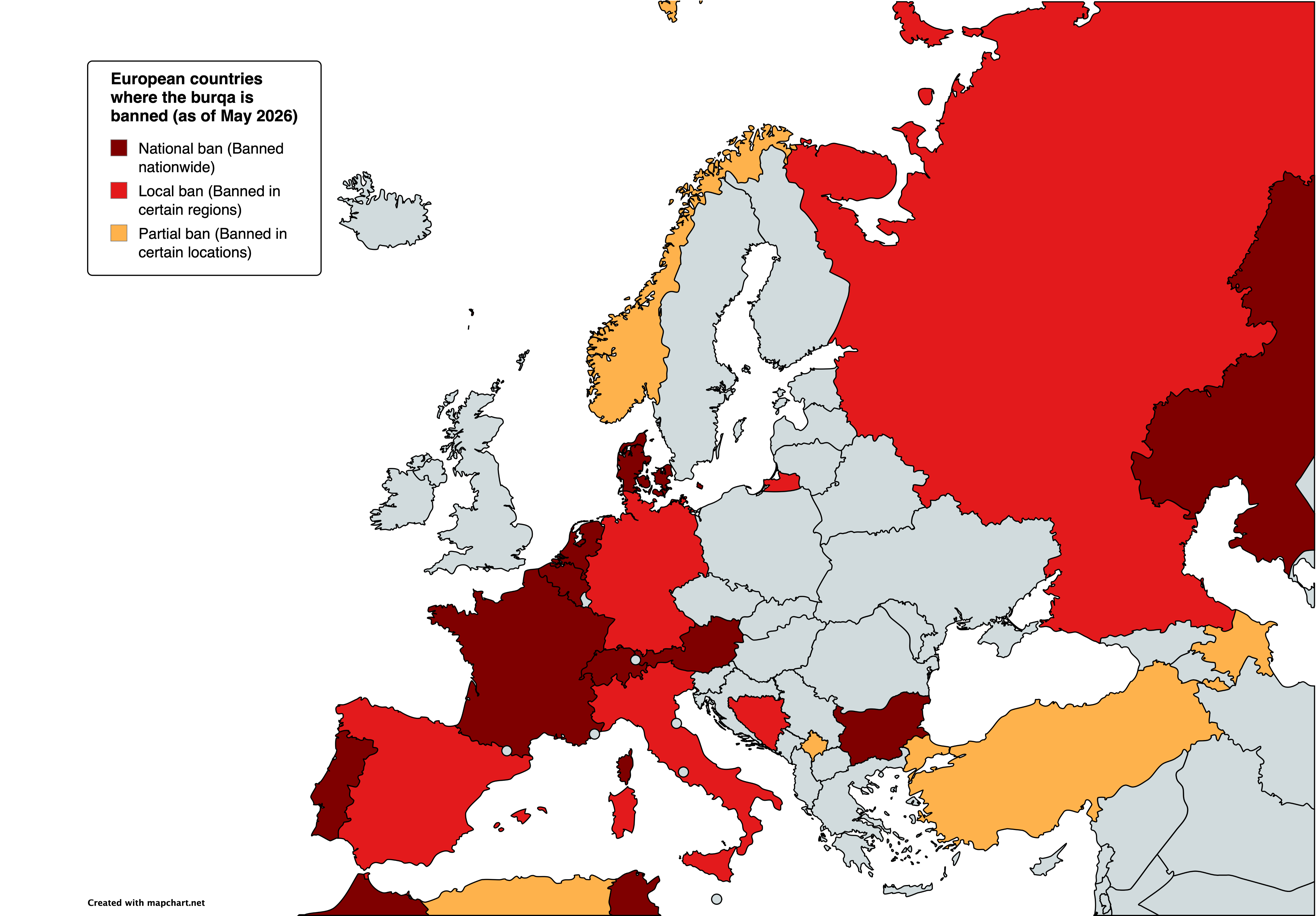
Europe Burqa Bans. Map current as of 2025 National ban – country bans women from wearing full-face veils in public Local ban – cities or regions ban full-face veils Partial ban – government bans full-face veils in some locations

As of October 2025, the following European states have introduced full or partial ban of the burqa: Austria, France, Belgium, Denmark, Bulgaria, Portugal, the Netherlands (in public schools, hospitals and on public transport), Germany (partial bans in some states), Italy (in some localities), Spain (in some localities of Catalonia), Russia (in the Stavropol Krai), Luxembourg, Switzerland, Norway (in nurseries, public schools and universities), and Kosovo (in public schools), Bosnia and Herzegovina (in courts and other legal institutions).

=== Albania ===
The ban on the veil in Albania occurred progressively in the past, intending to "Europeanize" Islam, supposing a constant negotiation between religion and the state in which Albanian political authorities and secularist intellectuals wanted to build a multi-denominational nation that would also suppose the devalorization of Islam among the elites.

Islamic reformism in Albania dates back to before World War I as a strategy to modernize Islam about the West and as a reaction to the activities of Christian missionaries in religion and education, the political superiority of the West, and Western Imperialism. Therefore, the reform was focused on science, education, secularism, and women, as a way of "modernizing" Islam and making Albania more relevant in the European and global context, however, there was no important progress until well after WWI.

After World War I, the post-Ottoman Albania was populated by 60% Muslims, 30% Orthodox, and 10% Catholics; and during the inter-war period, the state took decisive steps to secularize society and the educational system. Despite this Muslim majority, the Albanian leaders defined the state as after ("without religion"), intending to strengthen national feeling among a population that was divided between different religious groups.

After World War II, Albania was taken under the Communist regime, with Hoxha as the leader of the nation who prohibited any type of religion, claiming that religion divides the Albanian population. Albania was under Hoxha's dictatorship for nearly 5 decades, until the early 1990s, when it became a democratic state. However, the new democratic state has struggled and it is still very irregular, unstable, and corrupt which makes it very difficult for Albania to join the European Union; but despite this fact, the Albanians are very tolerant toward other religions as a consequence of the constant ban on religion and being forced to coexist with other religious groups to unify the nation. As for today, the Albanian government has not currently enforced any laws that limit Muslim dress in public places, but school principals have the right to set standards for "appropriate clothing" that may include banning any public displays of religious symbols, including headscarves (hijab). The same situation is applied to most state and public institutions that do not allow wearing the hijab, and justify that decision by claiming that the secularity of the state must be maintained.

=== Austria ===
Austria banned full-face veils in early 2017. Austria's ban comes from a deal to save the coalition government. The ban prohibits full-face veils such as the niqab and burka in courts and schools. Austria is investigating the possibility of banning headscarves for women employed in the public service. The ban is part of changes made by the ruling Social Democratic Party of Austria (SPÖ) and the center-right Austrian People's Party (ÖVP) to avoid the collapse of their coalition government which would force snap elections.

According to The Guardian, only 100 to 150 women are estimated to wear full-face veils in Austria. A government spokesman said the ban will apply to tourist destinations like ski resorts and the urban center of Vienna. Further, government officials say that civil servants in executive positions, such as judges and state prosecutors, should not wear clothing that represents their religious affiliation. The Austrian justice ministry, however, has distanced itself from the proposal, saying that guidelines are already in place for clothing in court.

In 2017, a legal ban on face-covering Islamic clothing was adopted by the Austrian parliament.

In 2020, the Austrian Government announced plans to ban the headscarf in schools for girls up to age 14, an extension of the garment ban law applying until age 10 approved by lawmakers earlier in 2019. However, on 11 December 2020 the Austrian Constitutional Court struck down the law as it found the text to be discriminatory, as it targeted the headdress of Muslim schoolgirls instead of all religious symbols worn by members of any gender on any part of the body. In 2025, Austria banned girls under the age of fourteen from wearing headscarves at recess and lessons in school, with the law taking effect in September 2026. Following the implementation of this law, a demonstration against the law was held on October 9, 2026. The organizers of the demonstration said that the law is discriminatory and violates religious freedom.

=== Belgium ===
Several Belgian municipalities have used municipal by-laws on face-covering clothing to ban public wearing of the niqab and burqa. The town of Maaseik was the first to implement a ban in October 2004. Khadija El Ouazzani, spouse of Belgian-born Khalid Bouloudo, considered by the Belgian authorities as the Belgian coordinator of the terrorist Moroccan Islamic Combatant Group, was fined €75 in April 2005 under the by-law for wearing a burqa. In 2006, a local police court upheld the ban and the fine. According to mayor Jan Creemers (Flemish Christian Democrats), 5 or 6 women in Maaseik had "caused feelings of insecurity" by wearing a burqa, and he had received complaints about them. He warned the women to stop. After that, only El Ouazzani continued to wear the burqa, and the by-law was activated.

In late 2004, at Creemers request Marino Keulen, Flemish-Liberal interior minister in the Flemish government, created a standard prohibition for burqas, and sent it to all 308 municipalities in Flanders. The regulation states that persons on the public street and in public buildings must be identifiable at all times "to protect the social order, which allows a harmonious process of human activities". It prohibits covering the forehead, the cheeks, the eyes, the ears, the nose and the chin. Carnival, Sinterklaas, and Father Christmas are exempt. According to Keulen:

As Minister for Integration, I respect culture tradition and belief, but wearing a burqa has nothing to do with religious belief, but with traditional dress in Pakistan and Afghanistan. Besides, wearing a burqa has an intimidating effect, and it can not be tolerated that Muslim women are excluded from society because they are isolated behind their burqa, and can't communicate with the world around them.

All municipalities can choose if they want to adopt the regulation and six have done so. In August 2006, mayor Creemers called for a national ban. The anti-immigrant and separatist party Vlaams Belang, formerly Vlaams Blok, had earlier advocated a ban at the Flemish level, and locally in Antwerp. Although Vlaams Belang is excluded from power in Antwerp, by a coalition of all other parties, the ban was adopted. It was first applied in 2005 when a woman was fined because only her eyes were visible.

On 31 March 2010 the Belgian Chamber Committee on the Interior unanimously approved legislation instating a nationwide ban on wearing the burqa in public. The proposal was accepted by the Chamber of Representatives on 27 April 2010 with only two abstentions from Flemish Socialist MPs. A law was finally voted by both federal parliamentary chambers on 28 April 2011, as the parliamentary process had been interrupted by elections in June 2010. One Flemish Green MP voted against, two French-speaking Green MPs abstained.

Amnesty International Brussels has criticized the proposed legislation, stating that it is "being presented as an act to combat discrimination against women, whereas it is an act of discrimination in itself". The BBC also estimate that "[o]nly around 30 women wear this kind of veil in Belgium, out of a Muslim population of around half a million".

=== Bosnia and Herzegovina ===
Lawyers, prosecutors, and others employed in judicial institutions cannot wear the hijab to work. The ban applies to the "religious symbols" of all religions. Whether third parties, such as witnesses, will be permitted to participate in hearings while wearing it is determined on a case-by-case basis.

=== Bulgaria ===
In 2016, a legal ban on fully face-covering veils was adopted by the Bulgarian parliament.

=== Cyprus ===
In 2019, the ELAM (Cyprus) party submitted a bill seeking to impose a ban on all Muslim headgear in public spaces, including schools.

=== Denmark ===
A Danish law banning the public wearing of a niqab or burka took effect on 1 August 2018.

Following an incident in which a burqa-clad journalist was able to pass unchecked through security at Copenhagen airport, the government stressed to the airports the need for passengers to show their faces.

In 2006, Asmaa Abdol-Hamid caused much debate when she hosted a TV show on DR2 wearing a hijab. The controversy continued the following year when she announced she would be running for parliament. Member of Parliament Søren Krarup, of the Danish People's Party, questioned whether wearing a hijab in parliament was constitutional and said the headscarf is a totalitarian symbol, comparable to the Nazi swastika or the communist hammer and sickle.

In April 2007, the Odense city council asked the Minister for Family and Consumer Affairs of Denmark to rule on a case in which a Muslim woman refused to remove her veil for her job as a family care worker. A majority in parliament was ready to give employers the right to ban Muslim niqab and burka veils for employees.

In May 2008, the Danish government decided that judges in courts should strive for religious and political neutrality, and that consequently they would no longer be allowed to wear visible religious symbols, including crucifixes, kippas and head scarves.

In autumn 2017, the Danish government adopted a law prohibiting people from wearing "attire and clothing masking the face in such a way that it impairs recognizability". On 31 May 2018, the Danish parliament adopted the law.

In August 2022, a commission appointed by the government recommended a ban on hijabs in schools, which sparked backlash and protests. The chairman of the commission stated, "our focus is to make sure that the girls who don't have the same personal rights as the rest of us, gets them". The parties of Social Democrats, Venstre, and Conservative People's Party have neither stated support nor opposition to the recommendation, the Danish People's Party have expressed support, and the Red-Green Alliance and Danish Social Liberal Party have expressed opposition. Venstre and the Social Democrats had earlier been explicitly against a hijab ban. Kaare Dybvad, the Minister for Immigration and Integration, described the recommendation as "brave" and "exciting", stating that he "completely agreed that ... there are many young girls and women in Denmark who are oppressed by social control and religious norms". However, the minister did not explicitly express support or opposition as to whether the recommendation should become law. The proposed ban was seen as possibly being against the constitutional freedom of religion, to which the commission responded that it would support a ban against all religious symbols in schools. In July 2026 it was reported that the Danish government has proposed to expand the ban on Hijab to schools and universities. a move aiming to strengthen integration of migrants. The proposal was made by the government of Prime Minister Mette Frederiksen.

=== Estonia ===
In Estonia, the wearing of Islamic dress is currently permitted, but in 2015, the Estonian Ministry of Justice was reportedly preparing a bill that would ban wearing a burka or niqab in public spaces, such as state offices, schools, and hospitals.

The Conservative People's Party of Estonia is the largest party in Estonia that supports banning the burka.

=== France ===
The 2004 French law on secularity and conspicuous religious symbols in schools bans all clothing that constitutes an ostensible religious symbol from government-operated schools. It is typically justified as a measure to ensure the secularism and religious neutrality of the state – the principle of Laïcité. In December 2003, President Jacques Chirac supported a new law to explicitly forbid any "visible sign of religious affiliation", in the spirit of laïcité. The law was passed by the French parliament in March 2004.

The law forbids the wearing of any "ostensible" religious articles by students, but does not cite any item; yet, ministerial instructions appear to target the Islamic veil, the Jewish kippah, and large Christian crosses. Instructions permit discreet signs of faith, such as small crosses, Stars of David, and hands of Fatima. The law does not apply to parents or students attending universities. However, teachers and other school personnel are also prohibited from displaying their religious affiliation based on "public service neutrality". Similar policies are occasionally applied in other state organizations, such as personnel working in public hospitals.

The French controversy primarily relates to the Islamic veil as a symbol of religion that challenges Laïcité, or of female subservience, and only secondarily to practical factors such as face-to-face communication, or security risks. The 2004 law says nothing about the wearing of Islamic dress in public (on the street), nor about wearing religious signs in higher education or private education establishments.

In 2009, the issue has not receded with further calls by some government ministers for a more widespread inquiry on the implications of liberty, subservience and the veil with regards to public life.

The French National Assembly appointed 32 lawmakers from right and left-wing parties on a six-month fact-finding mission to look at ways of restricting its use. An imam Hassen Chalghoumi backed the ban and he was threatened. On 26 January 2010, the group delivered its report, which had been agreed by six votes to six (the chair's vote in favor being decisive) with twenty abstentions. The report says that women should not be allowed to wear the burqa when accessing public services.

In September 2010, it became illegal to wear face coverings unless specifically needed to perform a function. It is illegal to wear the burqa in public in France. Fines are 150 euros for women wearing it and 30,000 euros for men forcing their wives to wear it, with up to one year in prison. The law was passed in the Senate by 246 votes to 1. The first fine was issued on 22 September 2011.

The law was challenged and taken to the European Court of Human Rights, which upheld the law on 1 July 2014, accepting the argument of the French government that the law was based on "a certain idea of living together".

=== Germany ===
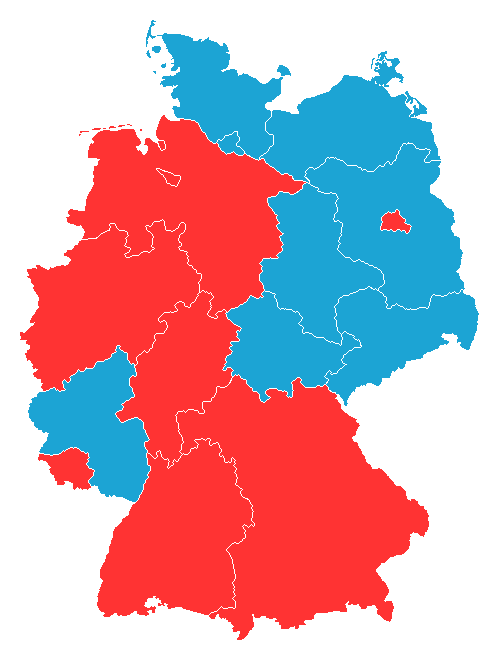
Shown in red are German states banning the wearing of headscarves by female teachers (as of 2007).

Eight of Germany's 16 states contain restrictions on wearing the hijab by female teachers: first Baden-Württemberg, then Bavaria, Hesse, Lower Saxony, the Saarland, Bremen, North Rhine-Westphalia and Berlin. The city-state of Berlin banned all religious symbols in public institutions, including the Christian crucifix and the Jewish kippah.

Five of these states that ban religious clothing, contain an exception for Christian symbols and clothing: Baden-Württemberg, Saarland, Hesse, Bavaria, and North Rhine-Westphalia. In Baden-Württemberg, the state prohibits Muslim teachers from wearing the headscarf but allows teachers to wear Christian clothing, such as the nun's habit. The state courts upheld an appeal against the ban by several Muslim teachers, on the grounds of religious discrimination, since Catholic nuns are allowed to teach in full religious habit. The state government has appealed the decision. The regulation in North Rhine-Westphalia is similar to that in Baden-Württemberg. Bavaria also allows the nun's habit, while banning the Muslim headscarf.

Education in Germany is the responsibility of the individual states, which each have their education ministry. In September 2003, the German Federal Constitutional Court (Bundesverfassungsgericht) ruled that states could ban the wearing of Islamic headscarves by female teachers and that this would not infringe the constitutional protection of freedom of religion. However, a ban could only be implemented by a state law, and not by administrative decisions.

In one incident involving Islamic dress in Germany, two 18-year-old students, one Turkish and one Kurdish, appeared at a school in Bonn in a burqa; they were suspended for "disturbing the peace." The German Finance Minister canceled a visit to the school, and the two were investigated by the intelligence service, who suspected them of contact with the controversial King Fahd Academy in Bonn. The incident illustrates the sensitivity in Germany over Islamic dress, especially in schools. It led the Justice Minister Brigitte Zypries to call for nationwide standard school uniforms (itself a sensitive issue in Germany because of the association with the Nazi Hitler Youth and the East German Free German Youth).

In 2004, then President of Germany Johannes Rau spoke on the "headscarf issue" and the nature of the German state, as compared to the officially secular French state:

I fear that a headscarf ban will be the first step on the road to a laicistic state, which will prohibit religious signs and symbols in the public sphere. I don't want to see that happen. That is not my vision of our country, with its centuries of Christian influence.

In Germany, women in burqas or chadors are forbidden to drive motor vehicles for reasons of road safety. The Federal Transport Ministry confirmed that a de facto ban already exists.

In 2006, Ekin Deligöz, a Turkish-born woman parliamentarian, triggered an uproar by calling on fellow Turkish German women to take off their scarves as a way to show their willingness to integrate into German society.

Name Çakir, a Muslim activist in Germany, raises other concerns related to headscarves in that banning them increases discrimination against Muslim women and aggravates their integration into modern society by making it harder for them to find a job and forcing them into an acute conflict between family and society, which places a much more disastrous burden on Muslim women than on Muslim men (see names and "honor killing" articles). Çakir states that for women, education and career are more important for emancipation than external attributes of clothing.

In 2017, a legal ban on face-covering clothing for soldiers and state workers during work was approved by German parliament. The same year, a legal ban on face-covering clothing for car and truck drivers were approved by German Ministry of Traffic.

In July 2020, the Green-led government of Baden-Württemberg banned full-face coverings, burqas and niqabs for all school children. The rule will apply to primary and secondary education.

The Alternative for Germany is the first political party in Germany that advocates a ban on the burqa and niqab in public places. On 21 February 2026, political party Christian Democratic Union of Germany (CDU) advocates a ban on the burqa and niqab in public places.

=== Italy ===
The Court of Justice of the European Union gave companies the right to justify headscarf bans using a neutrality policy. In Italy, the proposals for bans reflect some of the general feelings of Europe while also revealing much of their history. Immigration in the last two decades has introduced Islam as an immigrant religion in Italy. A country where the population is traditionally Catholic now has a Muslim presence of over one million people. The Islamic veil has become a national political issue, usually in combination with other Islam-related issues, such as new mosques, and the teaching of the Qur'an in schools. The anti-immigration and separatist Lega Nord has focused recent campaigns on the prohibition of the burqa, although as with the Party for Freedom in the Netherlands, the wider issue is immigration. Specifically, some mayors in the Anti-Immigrant Northern League have targeted banning the use of Islamic swimsuits.

After local anti-burqa campaigns, several municipalities imposed a ban, but these have been suspended by Regional Administrative Tribunals. The Regional Administrative Tribunal of Friuli-Venezia Giulia suppressed, for largely technical reasons, bans imposed by a municipal government. Beginning in 1975, Italy had a national anti-terrorism law in place, outlawing any mask or article of clothing that makes it impossible to identify the wearer. An exception to this has been added to allow wearers with "just cause," which can be seen as including face coverings for religious purposes. Use of law 152/1975 which prohibits the use of motorcycle helmets to evade identification cannot be extended to cover the veil or burqa. The Italian Constitution gives citizens the right to wear religious dress through articles 8, 19, and 21. Lombardy banned facial veils for security reasons in government buildings and hospitals in December 2015, coming into effect in January 2016. In October 2025, government party Brothers of Italy plans a ban on wearing of niqabs and burkas in Italy.

=== Kosovo ===
The Kosovo government drafted the new Republic of Kosovo constitution in 2008. This constitution stipulates "equality of all individuals" and includes statutes that designate religious freedom, as well as freedom of expression. Only a year following the ratification of their constitution, the government of Kosovo passed legislation that banned the wearing of headscarves in schools, based on Kosovo being a secular country, despite having a population of two million people, in which 96% are Muslim.

The Ministry of Education, Science, and Technology constructed this prohibition of Islamic headscarves. The Ministry of Education, Science, and Technology received ample support within the government; when interviewed by Mark Lowen from BBC News, Kosovo's Deputy Foreign Minister, Vlora Citaku explained: "The scarf in Kosovo is not an element of our identity. It's a sign of submission of female to male, rather than a sign of choice. I don't think a 16 or 17-year-old, let alone a five-year-old, can take the conscious decision to wear a scarf".

In 2009, the headscarf ban was challenged by a young woman who claimed it was infringing upon her constitutional rights. The state court ruled against her following the precedent set by the European Court of Human Rights asserting "to reconcile the interests of the various groups and ensure that everyone's beliefs are respected". Despite protests and further challenges of the ban by the "Islamic-oriented Justice Party", the Islamic headscarf ban is prevailing.

=== Latvia ===
A legal ban of face-covering Islamic clothing was adopted by the Latvian parliament. Latvian president Raimonds Vējonis stated at the time that there was a security component involved when he came out officially supporting the ban. The country was at the time preparing to welcome 250 refugees from the Middle East and Africa. Vējonis stated in a public interview: "I don't want to somehow escalate the situation and raise the possible threat level in our region. It is my personal opinion on why I support the ban on the burqa".

Latvian Justice Minister Dzintars Rasnacs stated publicly just a few months later that the government was debating two versions of the ban: "The first is to ban wearing clothes covering face only in certain places, including the state or educational ones. The second is to ban wearing burqa in all public places. The second concept was finally approved". However, this time he made it clear that the ban had nothing to do with threats to public safety, but in fact to protect "Latvia's cultural values, our common public and cultural space, and each individual".

=== Luxembourg ===
In 2018, a legal ban of face covering was adopted by the Luxembourg parliament.

=== Netherlands ===
In the Netherlands, a minority of Muslim women wear a headscarf. About 30% of Turkish women in the Netherlands, and around half of the Moroccan-Dutch women cover their hair. The percentage of the woman wearing headscarves in the Netherlands has decreased sharply over the last decades and shows a clear secularisation process; first-generation Turkish migrants wear headscarves twice as often (40%) as the second generation (20%). Immigration and Integration minister Rita Verdonk announced in November 2006 that the Netherlands would introduce legislation to ban face-covering clothing in public. Although a ban was publicly debated, the legislation resulted directly from a motion tabled in the Dutch House of Representatives by the anti-immigration politician Geert Wilders, calling upon the cabinet to introduce it. The cabinet proposals were delayed because of concerns about a conflict with freedom of religion. However, the Third Balkenende cabinet thought these issues were no longer an obstacle to legislation. The proposal was condemned by Muslim organizations.

In the November 2006 general election, Wilders' Party for Freedom won 9 seats (out of 150). Part of the party's platform is a complete ban on the burqa and Islamic headscarves in the civil service and schools, but all other parties refuse to include them in a coalition. A group of Muslim women organized a pro-burqa demonstration at the newly elected parliament in The Hague, on 30 November 2006. The demonstration attracted national media attention, despite having only 20 participants.

Following the 2006 election, the new cabinet had not taken a final decision on whether to introduce a ban and gave conflicting signals. A February 2007 opinion poll indicated that 66 percent support a ban and 32 percent oppose it.

Malaysia protested against the proposed ban soon after it was announced in 2006. Foreign minister Syed Hamid Albar called it a discriminatory treatment of Muslims and said it infringed on freedom of choice. The Islamic headscarf tudung is a political issue in Malaysia itself. According to the UNHCHR, female students in Malaysia are pressured to wear the tudung, and it is compulsory for female shop workers in Kelantan, while Malaysian politicians have protested against its prohibition in public schools in Singapore for prepuber (6 and 7 years old) pupils. According to a memo leaked to the Algemeen Dagblad, the Netherlands foreign ministry has warned of a possible controversy, similar to the Jyllands-Posten Muhammad cartoons controversy.

The proposed legislation in the Netherlands applies nationally. Earlier, schools and other institutions had enforced their bans on Islamic dress, although usually not on the Islamic headscarf. Employers also have their own policies. Cases of dismissal or exclusion from school are sometimes handled by the Netherlands Equality Commission, creating de facto national guidelines on what constitutes discrimination. In Amsterdam, school policies attracted media attention after an incident in 2003. A higher vocational college banned three students from wearing the niqab. One was removed by police when she tried to enter the school wearing the niqab: the school regulations are legally enforceable because unauthorized entry is trespass. The students appealed to the Equality Commission, which ruled (in March 2003) in favor of the school. The school justified the ban because the niqab "hindered eye contact, which testifies to mutual respect". The Commission agreed with the school, indicating that the educational necessity of contact and communication within the school building overrode the religious freedom aspects. The education minister, Maria van der Hoeven, of the Christian-Democratic party CDA, publicly approved the Commission decision. The Amsterdam CDA subsequently called for a national ban on chador, burqa, and niqab in schools, partly because they conflicted with common national values.

The cities of Amsterdam and Utrecht have proposed cutting social security benefits to unemployed women wearing a burqa, because it makes them unemployable in a predominantly non-Muslim country.

The Dutch government parliament, in January 2012, enacted a ban on face-covering clothing, popularly described as the "burqa ban". Offenders can be fined up to 390 euro. The prohibition does not apply to face covering that is necessary for the health, safety or the exercise of a profession or practicing a sport. Excluded from the ban are also events such as Sinterklaas, Carnival, Halloween or when a mayor is granted an exemption for a particular event. Also excluded from prohibition are places and buildings intended for religious purposes. The prohibition does not apply to passengers on airplanes and airports who are traveling through the Netherlands to their final destination.

=== Norway ===
While there is currently no ban on Islamic dress in Norway, the issue has been widely discussed in recent years. In March 2010, a ban on the burqa and niqab in public places was eventually proposed in the Norwegian Parliament by the Progress Party. Before the formal proposal was made, a ban had been supported by figures such as the Labour Party Spokesperson on Immigration Issues, Lise Christoffersen, as well as several individual politicians from both opposition and government parties. When the proposal was up for consideration in May, it was, however, rejected by all parties on the Justice Committee, except for the Progress Party. Minister of Justice Knut Storberget had earlier claimed there to be a "great danger" that a general ban on "wholly covering clothing" could conflict with Article 9 of the European Convention on Human Rights. Per-Willy Amundsen of the Progress Party, in response, claimed that the government was increasingly "hiding themselves behind international conventions" on questions regarding immigration and integration, in order to avoid tougher political discussions which divided the government.

In autumn 2017, Norway government adopted a law prohibiting people from wearing "attire and clothing masking the face in such a way that it impairs recognizability" in schools and in universities.

In 2018, the Norway parliament voted to ban the burqa in schools and universities.

=== Portugal ===
On 17 October 2025 the parliament of Portugal approved a ban on face veils for "gender or religious" reasons and making it punishable by up to 2000 euros.

The bill, promoted by right wing party Chega and backed by the governing centre-right Social Democratic Party, was enacted by president António José Seguro on 19 August 2026. Violators face a fine of 150 to 3000 euros. On August 19, 2026, António José Seguro, Portugal's president enacted the law banning face coverings in public.

=== Spain ===
The Spanish resort Sa Pobla on the island of Mallorca has banned women from wearing burqas or face-covering Islamic veils in public places, even though only two women living there are known to do so. Mayor Biel Serra of the town of Sa Pobla said the vote was not about cultural or religious discrimination but rather an issue of public safety and people showing their faces so they can be identified. Sa Pobla joins a handful of other Spanish towns that have enacted some form of ban on body-covering burqas or face-covering niqabs.

A 2010 survey by the Pew Global Attitudes Project found that a clear majority of Spanish people support banning the burqa.

=== Sweden ===
In Sweden, the wearing of Islamic dress is permitted. Swedish prime minister Fredrik Reinfeldt declared himself to be against a ban on veils in January 2010, saying "legislation shouldn't lead to certain women being isolated even more from Swedish society". Coalition partner Centre Party also declared itself against a ban, describing the wearing of head-to-toe veils as "a rarely occurring problem" that is "not something that should be solved through legislation". Opposition leader Stefan Löfven also rejected the idea of such a law.

According to an investigation of 3,000 cases of honor culture violence by the newspaper Göteborgsposten, the Islamic veil is a frequent issue with girls who are forced to wear it and are beaten by family members if they refuse or take it off, most frequently with bare hands but also being beaten with belts or cables. In several cases, the children have been burned with kitchen utensils or metal objects.

In December 2019, the municipality of Skurup banned Islamic veils in educational institutions. Earlier, the municipality of Staffanstorp approved a similar ban. The ban was overturned by Swedish court in 2022.

The Sweden Democrats are the largest party in Sweden that advocates a ban on the burqa and niqab in public places.

On 12 October 2025, Christian Democrats (KD) leader and Deputy Prime Minister Ebba Busch proposed a nationwide ban on burqas and niqabs in public places such as streets, squares, shopping centres, and healthcare facilities.[36] Education and Integration Minister and Leader of the Liberals Simona Mohamsson expressed support for stronger measures against religious oppression, including forced veiling, but did not explicitly endorse Busch’s proposal,[37] and neither did any other party in the Tidö Government.[38]

=== Switzerland ===
The results of the March 2021 referendum on Banning the Burka by canton. Red indicates opposition to the ban on the Burka, and green supports the banning of the Burka.

In a referendum on 7 March 2021, Swiss voters approved a nationwide ban on face concealment, with over 51% of the electorate supporting it.

By popular referendum approved by 66% of the voters in September 2013, the canton of Ticino prohibited to hiding of the face in a public area. While the Swiss proposal did not target Muslim women specifically, the referendum became known as the "anti-burka" initiative. The referendum was pushed by conservative campaigners and was criticized by Amnesty International. One of the supporters of the ban, Giorgio Ghiringhelli, said he wanted to put a stop to "the inevitable spread of niqabs and burkas".

Ticino is not the first region of Switzerland to propose a ban on Islamic veils. Three other Swiss regions previously had proposals to ban burqas and niqabs but dismissed them, making Ticino the first of the country's 26 cantons to pass such a ban. Due to the ban, Muslims face fines up to £8,000 for wearing burkas in Switzerland. The Swiss People's Party, the country's largest party, is attempting to collect enough signatures for a national referendum on its prohibition.

In October 2017, it was announced that after getting more than 100,000 signatures for a referendum Switzerland will have a public vote within a year.

In January 2018, a newspaper poll indicated that 76% of Swiss voters would approve of a nationwide ban on face coverings.

In September 2018, the Canton of St Gallen became the second canton in Switzerland to vote in favor of a ban on facial coverings in public with two-thirds casting a ballot in favor.

=== Slovakia ===
In 2016, Slovak National Party leader Andrej Danko called for the Burka to be Banned in Slovakia.

=== Turkey ===
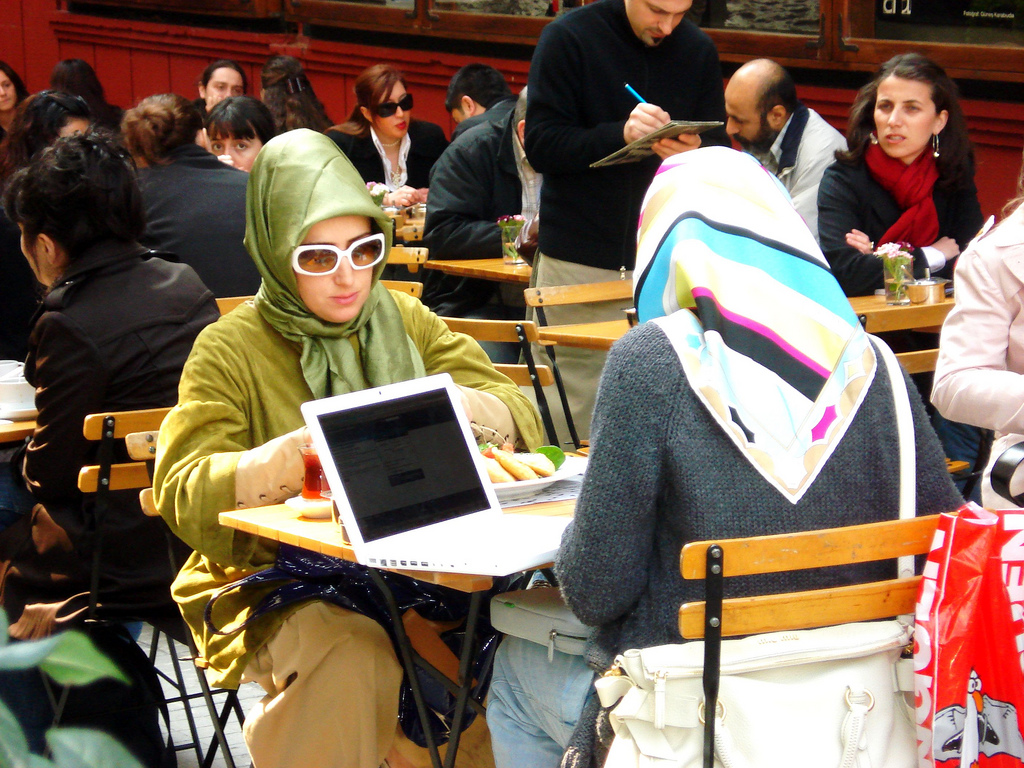
Turkish women wearing headscarves, Istanbul, Turkey

Turkey was a secular state founded by Mustafa Kemal Atatürk in 1923. Atatürk saw headscarves as backward-looking and an obstacle to his campaign to secularize and modernize the new Turkish Republic. The fez, a hat worn by men, was banned. Kemalist ideology continues to emphasize secularism, despite the majority of Turks being Muslims.

Until the 1960s, female students or public servants wearing headscarves were not seen in Turkey. In 1968, a university student, Hatice Babacan, refused to remove her headscarf and from then onwards, although there was not a uniformly applied ban, some problems began to arise for students wearing headscarves at universities.

With the rise of the Islamic movement in Turkey in the 1970s and early 1980s, the number of university students wearing headscarves increased substantially, and in 1984, the first widespread application of the headscarf ban came into effect at the universities, but throughout the 1980s and 1990s, the ban was not uniformly enforced and many students were able to graduate, albeit with many difficulties, and begin their professional careers without compromising on their headscarves. After the so-called 28 February process in 1997, the ban on headscarves and other Islamic coverings was taken to such extremes that even some hospitals refused to care for patients wearing headscarves. The headscarf ban in public spaces, including schools and universities (public and private), courts of law, government offices, and other official institutions, is only for students, workers, and public servants. Hence, mothers of pupils or visitors would have no problems at all entering primary schools, but they would not be able to work as teachers. Similarly, in the courts of law, the ban only involves judges, attorneys, lawyers, and other workers. Wearing headscarves in photos on official documents like licenses, passports, and university enrollment documents is prohibited.

In 1998, a Turkish student was banned for wearing a headscarf at Istanbul University. In 2000, Nuray Bezirgan, a Turkish student, wore a headscarf at her college final exams. A Turkish court sentenced her to six months in jail for "obstructing the education of others". The European Court of Human Rights upheld the ban in 2004, saying the rules on the dress were "necessary" and did not violate the European Convention on Human Rights. In October 2006, the European Court of Human Rights upheld the university ban again, rejecting a complaint filed by another Turkish university student.

In October 2006, Turkish president Ahmet Necdet Sezer refused to allow Justice and Development Party (AKP) politicians whose wives wear the headscarves, at a ball marking Turkish independence, saying it would "compromise" and undermine the secular state founded by Kemal Atatürk.

On 7 February 2008, the Turkish Parliament passed an amendment to the constitution, allowing women to wear the headscarf in Turkish universities, arguing that many women would not seek an education if they could not wear the hijab. The decision was met with powerful opposition and protests from secularists. On 5 June 2008, the Constitutional Court of Turkey reinstated the ban on constitutional grounds of the secularity of the state. Headscarves had become a focal point of the conflict between the ruling AKP party and the secularist establishment, which includes the courts, universities, and army. The ruling was widely seen as a victory for Turks who claim this maintains Turkey's separation of state and religion. After winning a referendum in September 2010, the ruling AKP vowed to support any student who was disciplined for wearing the headscarf on a university campus. Following this, the head of the Turkish Higher Educational Council (YÖK), Yusuf Ziya Özcan, announced that instructors in universities may no longer take action against students wearing the headscarf. While this goes against the Constitutional Court ruling of 2008, most universities have started permitting students to wear the headscarf on campus.

=== United Kingdom ===
Former Secretary of State for Justice and Lord Chancellor Jack Straw initiated a nationwide controversy on "the veil" by criticizing its use in 2006. Straw said he would prefer to see no veils: "Yes. It needs to be made clear I am not talking about being prescriptive but with all the caveats, yes, I would rather".

In 2010, Straw publicly apologized for his 2006 comments, stating "If I had realized the scale of publicity that they [his comments] received in October 2006, I wouldn't have made them and I am sorry that it has caused problems and I offer that apology."

The legal status of Islamic dress in schools was clarified by the R v Headteacher and Governors of Denbigh High School, ex p Begum, where the Judicial Committee of the House of Lords ruled that freedom to manifest religious beliefs was not absolute, and could be restricted. Conservative columnist Theodore Dalrymple, noting that Shabina Begum was represented by the Prime Minister's wife, Cherie Blair, claims that the judgment was a political one, a concession to Muslim opinion offended by the campaign against Islamist terrorism.

In the Aishah Azmi case, an employment tribunal held that a school could refuse to employ a veiled teacher (wearing the niqab). Government ministers intervened in the employment tribunal case, supporting the school. This case provoked Prime Minister Tony Blair to comment that the veil was a "mark of separation", and minister Phil Woolas demanded that Azmi be sacked, accusing her of "denying the right of children to a full education". The school subsequently sacked her.

In another case, a lawyer dressed in a niqab was told by an immigration judge that she could not represent a client because, he said, he could not hear her.

A 2010 YouGov survey said that 67% of British people questioned wanted full-face veils outlawed.

== Burqa ban chronology ==
The table below lists in chronological order the European states, that are either UN members or have UN observer status, that have completely banned the burka.

Year abolished	Countries	Countries per year	Cumulative countries
2010	France	1	1
2011	Belgium	1	2
2015	Bulgaria	1	3
2017	Austria	1	4
2018	Denmark; Luxembourg	2	6
2019	Netherlands	1	7
2021	Switzerland	1	8
2025	Portugal	1	9

== See also ==
- Anti-veiling campaign in the Soviet Union
- Eurabia
- Burka by country
- Hijab controversy in Quebec
- Hijabophobia
- Islam and clothing
- Multiculturalism
- Muslims in Western Europe
- Women in Muslim societies
