= Eid Hassan Doha =

Egyptian Emeritus Professor

- Born: November 14, 1945 (age 80); Egypt
- Education: Cairo University (BS 1967, MS 1972, PhD 1977)
- Known for: Spectral tau algorithms and Jacobi operational matrices for fractional differential equations
- Awards: African Academy of Sciences Fellow (2006); Cairo University Award for Excellence in Scientific Research in Basic Sciences (2007)
- Scientific career
- Fields: Approximation theory, orthogonal polynomials, spectral methods

Eid Hassan Doha is an Egyptian Emeritus Professor of Numerical Analysis and Approximation Theory at the Cairo University. He is an elected fellow of African Academy of Sciences, the head of the department of Mathematics at Cairo University and the Head of Promotion Committee of Research Assessment for Associate Professorships – Supreme Council of Egyptians Universities.

== Early life and education ==
Eid Hassan Doha was born on November 14, 1945. He attended University of Cairo from B.Sc. to PhD level. He obtained his B.Sc. in Pure and Applied Mathematics in 1967. He obtained his M.Sc and PhD in 1972 and 1977 respectively.

== Career ==
Eid Hassan Doha began his career in 1967 as a demonstrator of mathematics at the Faculty of Science, University of Cairo in Egypt. He became as assistant lecturer after his Master's programme in 1972. After his PhD, he became a full lecturer in the same university. However, he left the University of Cairo for Al-Khartoum, Sudan, a branch of the University of Cairo in 1979 and spent a year. In 1980, he moved to Emirates University, Al-Ain in the United Arab Emirates where he became associate professor after three years (1983). In 1990, he moved to Female Education, Girl’s College of Education, Jeddah, Kingdom of Saudi Arabia where he became professor of Numerical Analysis and Approximation Theory.

== Award and memberships ==
Eid Hassan Doha became a member of the Mathematical and Physical Society of Egypt in 1977 and a member of the American Mathematical Society in 1990. In 1993, he became a member of the Egyptian Mathematical Society and eventually became their Vice president. He was the Chairman of the Egyptian National Evaluation Committee for promoting assistant professors in Mathematics from 2004 to 2006. Also in 2004, he was elected as a member of the Egyptian National Committee of Mathematics (Academy of Scientific Research and Technology, Cairo). He was awarded an Excellence Research Paper by the Egyptian National Committee of Mathematics (Academy of Scientific Research and Technology, Cairo, Egypt in 2005. He became a Fellow of the African Academy of Sciences in 2006. He received Excellence Scientific Research in Basic Sciences" from Cairo University in 2007 and a member of the International Association for Mathematics and Computers in Simulation.
