= Ahmed Mohamed Al-Hofi =

- Born: 1910; Damanhur, Egypt
- Died: 1983 (aged 72–73)
- Education: University of Cairo
- Writing career
- Language: Arabic
- Notable awards: State Award (1983); Order of Merit (Egypt)

Ahmed Mohamed Al-Hofi (Arabic: أحمد محمد الحوفي, 1910 in Damanhur – 1983) was an Egyptian writer and an expert in literary studies.

== Biography ==
Al-Hofi earned a PhD and an MBA at the University of Cairo. He got the literature State Award (Arabic: جائزة الدولة التقديرية in 1983 and Order of Merit (Egypt). From 1936 to 1948 he worked as a teacher, after that he was professor of the faculty of science at the University of Cairo, Ain Shams University, Al-Azhar University, Institute of Higher Arabic Studies of the Arab League. In his whole life was member of Academy of the Arabic Language in Cairo from 1975, member of the Union of Writers, he was also member of Shura Council, Standing Committee of Promotion to the Posts of Professor. He died after a two-month-long disease in 1983.
