= Azmi v Kirklees Metropolitan BC =

British employment discrimination law case

Azmi v Kirklees MBC
- Court: Employment Appeal Tribunal
- Citation: [2007] IRLR 434 (EAT)

Case opinions
- Wilkie J

Keywords
- Religion, direct discrimination, indirect discrimination, harassment

Azmi v Kirklees Metropolitan Borough Council [2007] IRLR 434 (EAT) is a UK labour law case, concerning indirect discrimination on grounds of religion. The United Kingdom Employment Appeals Tribunal in London (EAT) dismissed the appeal in respect of discrimination and/or harassment, but awarded £1,100 to the plaintiff for victimisation, uprated by 10% as a result of the LEA's having failed to follow the statutory grievance protocol.

== Facts ==
Aishah Azmi, a graduate (in English and Arabic) from Leeds University, was employed as a bi-lingual support worker at Headfield Church of England (Controlled) Junior School, Thornhill Lees, Dewsbury, West Yorkshire (where 92% of the students were Muslim), claimed constructive unfair dismissal for religious discrimination, because the school refused to allow her to wear a niqab that covered her entire face except her eyes as she worked with male colleagues and schoolchildren. The Employment Appeal Tribunal stated the following fact summary.

At her interview, the Claimant had worn a black tunic and headscarf; her face was not covered. At no time during the interview did she indicate that her religious beliefs required her to wear a veil or placed any limitation on her working. She attended the training day on 1 September 2005 in advance of term starting. On that occasion she dressed in a similar manner without her face being covered. At the hearing, the Claimant was asked the reason for her apparent change in practice and she explained that her husband had suggested to her that she should go unveiled.

After Azmi requested to be able to wear the veil the school and the local authority allowed her to wear the niqab temporarily outdoors in school grounds, but was concerned that many male colleagues were necessarily in the classrooms. They investigated whether wearing the niqab was compatible with doing her job, but ultimately found in a report "Gesture and body language including facial expression reinforce the spoken word" and noted Azmi's "lovely friend smiling manner with the children and how they responded well to this" but that children could not respond to her teaching so well when her face was concealed. Accordingly, they concluded that Azmi could not continue working if she kept the niqab. Between November and February Azmi took time off and it was agreed to resolve the issue in the Tribunal.

The Employment Tribunal dismissed Azmi's claims for direct and indirect religious discrimination and harassment but found that she had been victimised for complaining, and awarded £1000, increased by 10% for the local authority's failure to follow the statutory grievance procedure. Azmi appealed the finding on direct and indirect discrimination and harassment. She was subsequently dismissed by Kirklees Council in February 2006. She lodged papers with the Employment Appeals Tribunal in London, although she was publicly advised by her MP Shahid Malik to drop the case, since 'there is no real support for it'. Azmi's legal representative was Nick Whittingham of Kirklees Law Centre, and barrister Declan O'Dempsey of Cloisters Chambers represented her during her appeal, heard in 2007.

== Judgment ==
Wilkie J in the Employment Appeal Tribunal held that there was no direct or indirect discrimination or harassment. He found the Tribunal's conclusion that another non-Muslim person covering their face for whatever reason would have been dismissed as well would have been treated the same, and so there was no direct discrimination. On the claim for indirect discrimination, he said the following:

73. ...In addition to the paragraph to which we have referred, the ET reminded itself of the consideration which had been given by the Respondent to alternative ways for accommodating the Appellant's wish to wear her veil when in the classroom with a male teacher, including suggestions that she use a screen; or that she remain with her back to the teacher; or that she remove the target group from the classroom; or that she use more hand and body gestures; or that the timetable be changed so that she only taught with female teachers...
In respect of each of these possible alternatives, including actions such as raising her voice, the ET in paragraph 25 concluded that it was satisfied that the Respondent had shown that the imposition of the [provision, criterion or practice] was a proportionate means of achieving their legitimate aim. They did so having explicitly reminded themselves of the approach identified most recently in Hardy and Hansons Plc v Lax and having conducted the kind of stringent investigation of the alternative means of achieving the aim by not imposing this requirement upon the Appellant, and having concluded that the Respondent had discharged the statutory burden upon it. In those circumstances, in our judgment, the ET did not err in law in its decision on whether the indirect discrimination that they found was justified within the terms of the statute. Accordingly the appeal on indirect discrimination fails.

== See also ==
- Islam in the United Kingdom
- Islamic dress controversy in Europe
- French law on secularity and conspicuous religious symbols in schools
