= George Messiha =

George Nagi Messiha Ibraheem (Arabic: جورج ناجي مسيحة ابراهيم; born February 9, 1982, in Cairo, Egypt) is a former Egyptian Parliament member (2011–2012). Ibraheem was also known for being a member of the Constituent Assembly 2012.

Munich Security Conference selected Dr. George Messiha as a member of the Munich Young Leaders 2014 to represent Egypt.

Ibraheem studied pharmaceutical studies at Cairo University in 2004.

He has participated in political activities defending the rights of Christians in Egypt following the Kosheh massacre.
