= Hany Mahfouz Helal =

Egyptian politician

Hany Mahfouz Helal was the Egyptian Minister of Higher Education and State Minister for Scientific Research. Helal served as the Cultural and Scientific Chancellor in the Egyptian embassy in Paris.

Helal worked as professor in the Faculty of Engineering, Cairo University (1993), and the Head of Senghor University, Alexandria (October 2004). He was an expert in Earth Sciences Programs of the UNESCO's regional office in Cairo (1993), and the UNESCO consultant of International Laboratory for Scantron, Jordan (2002).

Helal graduated from the Faculty of Engineering at Cairo University with a B.Sc. in Engineering (with honors) in 1974, and he holds a PhD degree in Earth Sciences (Rock Mechanics and Engineering).
