= List of Muslim feminists =

This is a list of important participants in Muslim feminism, sorted by surname within each period.

It may include, for instance, earlier authors who did not self-identify as feminists but have been claimed to have furthered "feminist consciousness" by a resistance of male dominance expressed in their works.

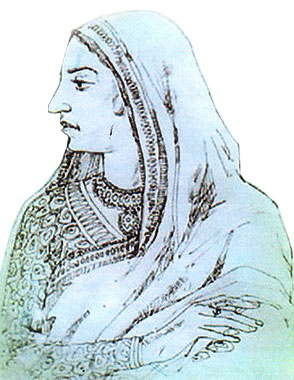
Nawab Faizunnessa, feminist from the early 19's

== Early and mid 19th-century feminists ==
Born between 1801 and 1874.

| Name | Country | Born | Died | Comments | Source |
|---|---|---|---|---|---|
| Nawab Faizunnesa | British India | 1834 | 1903 | female education advocate | |
| Qasim Amin | Egypt | 1863 | 1908 | early advocate of women's rights | |
| Hamida Javanshir | Azerbaijan | 1873 | 1955 | women's rights activist, philanthropist | |
| Aisha Taymur | Egypt | 1840 | 1902 | social activist, novelist | |
| Fatma Aliye Topuz | Turkey | 1862 | 1936 | women's rights activist, novelist | |
| Jamil Sidqi al-Zahawi | Iraq | 1863 | 1936 | poet, Islamic philosopher | |
| Zaynab Fawwaz | Lebanon | 1860 | 1914 | playwright, women's rights activist | |

== Late 19th-century and early 20th-century feminists ==
Born between 1875 and 1939.

| Name | Country | Born | Died | Comments | Source |
|---|---|---|---|---|---|
| Iffat Ara | Bangladesh | 1939 | – | writer, social activist | |
| Rashid Jahan | India | 1905 | 1952 | writer and medical doctor | |
| Margot Badran | United States | 1934 | - | Middle East historian and recognized scholar of Islamic feminism | |
| Eugénie Le Brun | Egypt | | 1908 | | |
| Hamid Dalwai | India | 1932 | 1977 | Socialist feminist | |
| Tahar Haddad | Tunisia | 1897 | 1935 | | |
| Zaib-un-Nissa Hamidullah | British India | 1921 | 2000 | pioneer in (pre)Pakistan | |
| Shamsiah Fakeh | Malaysia | 1924 | 2008 | political leader, Malaysian nationalist | |
| Hameeda Hossain | Bangladesh | 1936 | – | human rights activist, academic | |
| Fatima Ahmed Ibrahim | Sudan | 1933 | 2017 | | |
| Raden Adjeng Kartini | Indonesia | 1879 | 1904 | Javanese advocate for native Indonesian women, critic of polygamous marriages and lack of education opportunities for women | |
| Sufia Kamal | Bangladesh | 1911 | 1999 | advocate, nationalist, poet | |
| Anbara Salam Khalidi | Lebanon | 1897 | 1986 | author | |
| Shamsunnahar Mahmud | Pakistan | 1908 | 1964 | leader of the women's rights movement in Bengal | |
| Malak Hifni Nasif | Egypt | 1886 | 1918 | | |
| Nizar Qabbani | Syria | 1923 | 1998 | poet, progressive intellectual | |
| Alifa Rifaat | Egypt | 1930 | 1996 | novelist | |
| Begum Rokeya | British India | 1880 | 1932 | writer, educator | |
| Huda Sha'arawi | Egypt | 1879 | 1947 | organiser; founder of Egyptian Feminist Union | |
| Hidaya Sultan al-Salem | Kuwait | 1936 | 2001 | writer, campaigner, suffragist | |
| Rasuna Said | Indonesia | 1910 | 1965 | political leader, nationalist | |
| Saiza Nabarawi | Egypt | 1897 | 1985 | journalist | |
| Salma Sobhan | Bangladesh | 1937 | 2003 | lawyer, academic | |
| Qurratulain Hyder | India | 1927 | 12007 | novelist, academic, and journalist. | |
| Nurkhon Yuldasheva | Uzbekistan | 1913 | 1929 | dancer | |
| Ismat Chughtai | India | 1915 | 1991 | novelist, director | |

== Mid to late 20th-century and 21st-century feminists ==
Born from 1940 to present

| Name | Country | Born | Died | Comments | Source |
|---|---|---|---|---|---|
| Saleemah Abdul-Ghafur | United States | 1974 | – | Global health advocate | |
| Sitara Achakzai | Afghanistan | 1956 | 2009 | Leading Afghan Women's rights activist, member of the regional parliament in Kandahar | |
| Jamila Afghani | Afghanistan | 1974 | – | Women's rights activist, created the first "gender-sensitive training in Afghanistan for Imams" | |
| Mahnaz Afkhami | Iran | 1941 | – | Women's rights activist, Minister without portfolio for Women's Affairs, Founder and President of Women's Learning Partnership | |
| Haleh Afshar, Baroness Afshar | United Kingdom | 1944 | 2022 | Professor of politics and women's studies, member of the British House of Lords | |
| Nazir Afzal | United Kingdom | 1962 | – | Public prosecutor and campaigner focusing on violence against women and so-called honour crimes | |
| Leila Ahmed | Egypt | 1940 | – | Writer on Islam and feminism | |
| Safia Ahmed-jan | Afghanistan | 1941 | 2006 | Afghan women's rights advocate | |
| Kecia Ali | United States | 1972 | | Scholar of Islamic Jurisprudence (fiqh) | |
| Mariam Alhassan Alolo | Ghana | 1957 | – | Islamic missionary | |
| Amat Al Alim Alsoswa | Yemen | 1958 | – | Journalist | |
| Fadela Amara | France | 1964 | – | Politician | |
| Zainah Anwar | Malaysia | | – | Head of Sisters in Islam | |
| Seyran Ateş | Germany | 1963 | – | lawyer | |
| Shukria Barakzai | Afghanistan | 1970 | – | Politician, journalist | |
| Farzana Bari | Pakistan | 1952 | – | Human rights activist | |
| Asma Barlas | Pakistan | 1950 | – | Academic | |
| Benazir Bhutto | Pakistan | 1953 | 2007 | Prime Minister of Pakistan from 1988 to 1990 and from 1993 to 1996 | |
| Zoubeïda Bittari | Algerian | 1939 | – | Author of O, My Muslim Sisters, Weep | |
| Susan Carland | Australia | 1978 | – | Academic | |
| Kamala Chandrakirana | Indonesia | | – | Human rights activist | |
| Shirin Ebadi | Iran | 1947 | – | Activist, Nobel Peace Prize winner for her efforts for the rights of women and children | |
| Sineb El Masrar | Germany | 1981 | – | Moroccan-German author and magazine editor | |
| Mona Eltahawy | Egypt | 1967 | – | journalist | |
| Farid Esack | South Africa | 1959 | – | Muslim scholar, gender equity commissioner | |
| Zahra Eshraghi | Iran | 1964 | – | activist, former government official | |
| Soumaya Naamane Guessous | Morocco | | – | sociologist, women's rights activist | |
| Fatemeh Haghighatjoo | Iran | 1968 | – | reformist politician, contributed proposing a bill to join Convention on the Elimination of All Forms of Discrimination Against Women | |
| Mohammad Shafiq Hamdam | Afghanistan | 1981 | – | Chairman of the Afghan Anti-Corruption Network (AACN) | |
| Suheir Hammad | Jordan | 1973 | – | poet, political activist | |
| Riffat Hassan | Pakistan | 1943 | – | theologian, scholar of the Qur'an | |
| Hissa Hilal | Saudi Arabia | | – | poet | |
| Lubna al-Hussein | Sudan | | – | journalist, human rights activist | |
| Samira Ibrahim | Egypt | 1987 | – | activist | |
| Ramziya al-Iryani | Yemen | 1954 | – | novelist, diplomat | |
| Na'eem Jeenah | South Africa | 1965 | – | academic | |
| Mohja Kahf | Syria | 1967 | – | | |
| Meena Keshwar Kamal | Afghanistan | 1956 | 1987 | women's rights activist, founder of Revolutionary Association of the Women of Afghanistan | |
| Sultana Kamal | Bangladesh | 1950 | – | activist | |
| Sadiq Khan | United Kingdom | 1970 | – | Mayor of London since 2016 | |
| Zahra Mostafavi Khomeini | Iran | 1940 | – | | |
| Noushin Ahmadi Khorasani | Iran | 20th century | – | | |
| Fawzia Koofi | Afghanistan | 1975 or 1976 | – | politician, women' rights activist | |
| Elaheh Koulaei | Iran | 1956 | – | | |
| Konca Kuriş | Turkey | 1961 | 1999 | writer | |
| Asma Lamrabet | Morocco | | | | |
| Mukhtār Mā'ī | Pakistan | 1972 | – | advocate for women's rights | |
| Irshad Manji | Canada | 1968 | – | | |
| Farideh Mashini | Iran | | 2012 | women's rights activist | |
| Fatema Mernissi | Morocco | 1940 | 2015 | | |
| Ziba Mir-Hosseini | Iran | 1952 | – | academic of Islamic law and gender | |
| Fakhrossadat Mohtashamipour | Iran | | – | reformist activist, head of women's affairs at the Ministry of Interior | |
| Ilham Moussaïd | France | 1989 | – | politician | |
| Shirin Neshat | Iran | 1957 | – | visual artist | |
| Asra Nomani | India | 1965 | – | | |
| Queen Noor of Jordan | Jordan | 1951 | – | queen consort of Jordan | |
| Ayaz Latif Palijo | Pakistan | 1968 | – | politician | |
| Zahra Rahnavard | Iran | 1945 | – | academic, politician | |
| Queen Rania of Jordan | Jordan | 1970 | – | queen consort of Jordan | |
| Maryam Rajavi | Iran | 1953 | – | Iranian opposition politician. Advocatrs gender equality and women's participation in political leadership, calling for equal rights in political, social, cultural and economic life, freedom of dress, equal access to education and employment, and equal rights in marriage and divorce. | |
| Raheel Raza | Pakistan | 1949 | – | journalist, activist | |
| Nilofar Sakhi | Afghanistan | 20th century | – | human rights activist | |
| Zainab Salbi | Iraq | 1969 | – | humanitarian, CEO of Women for Women International | |
| Linda Sarsour | United States | 1980 | – | Islamist political activist | |
| Marjane Satrapi | France, Iran | 1969 | 2026 | comic artist | |
| Shamima Shaikh | South Africa | 1960 | 1998 | South African activist, member of the Muslim Youth Movement of South Africa, proponent of Islamic gender equality | |
| Shahla Sherkat | Iran | 1956 | – | journalist | |
| Nasrin Sotoudeh | Iran | 1963 | – | human rights lawyer | |
| Hidayet Şefkatli Tuksal | Turkey | 1963 | | human rights activist | |
| Zil-e-Huma Usman | Pakistan | 1971 | 2007 | politician, women's rights activist | |
| Amina Wadud | United States | 1952 | | | |
| Rama Yade | France | 1976 | | politician, writer | |
| Nadia Yassine | Morocco | 1958 | | | |
| Malala Yousafzai | Pakistan | 1997 | – | Pakistani activist for female education | |
| Bilkisu Yusuf | Nigeria | 1952 | 2015 | journalist, NGO adviser | |
| Kadra Yusuf | Norway | 1980 | | activist | |
| Musdah Mulia | Indonesia | 1960 | | human rights activist, Islamic scholar, theologian, proponent of Islamic gender equality and LGBTIQ, interfaith activist, one of founders and leaders of ICRP - Indonesian Conference on Religion and Peace | |
| Manal al-Sharif | Saudi Arabia | 1979 | | women's rights activist | |
| Samar Badawi | Saudi Arabia | 1981 | | women's rights activist | |
| Nassima al-Sadah | Saudi Arabia | 1974 | | women's rights activist | |

== Muslim feminist movements ==
- Gerwani
- Musawah
- Sister-hood
- Sisters in Islam
- Voice of Libyan Women
- Women's Islamic Initiative in Spirituality and Equality
- Revolutionary Association of the Women of Afghanistan
- Women Living Under Muslim Laws

== See also ==
- Islamic feminism
- Women in Islam
- List of feminists
- Liberalism and progressivism within Islam
- Islamo-Leftism
- Islamic socialism
