= Hermeneutics of feminism in Islam =

System of interpreting sacred texts

Hermeneutics of feminism in Islam is a system of interpreting the sacred texts of that religion, the Quran and Sunnah. Hermeneutics is the theory and methodology of interpretation, especially of sacred texts, and Islamic feminism has a long history upon which to draw. Muslim feminists reinterpret gendered Islamic texts and challenge interpretive traditions (e.g. exegesis, jurisprudence, Hadith compilations) to promote the ideas of gender equality.

The hermeneutics of feminism in Islam posits gender equality and justice as the foundation of Islamic morality, critically deconstructing historical Islamic perceptions of women. It employs various tools and methods of argument. These include focusing on women (opposing conventional male-centrist gender bias), giving primacy to equality and gender justice, reinterpreting relevant religious texts, and investigating, contesting, and exposing the historical contexts of religious texts and conservative interpretations which cause the perpetuation of injustice and inequality.

== History and context ==
The social, cultural, and political behavior of Muslim individuals, groups, institutions, and states is deeply influenced today by Islamic advice literature, including religious interpretive traditions.

According to several scholars, including Shemeem Burney Abbas, many hadiths were corrupted or even fabricated after the death of Muhammad. Abbas posits that the creation of hadiths was possibly a recreational activity, sharing stories for public entertainment; for others, it was an opportunity to exploit a skewed interpretation for vested interests in a culture of fiercely competitive power dynamics. According to Abbas, patriarchal interpretations are not only used to sideline women from political competition, keeping men in power by relegating women to subordinate roles, but also exploiting their immense resources. According to Margheriata Picchi, the marginalization of women in Quranic interpretation resulted in hierarchical gender roles and the false claim of the superiority of men over women.

According to Picchi, in the context of emerging feminist views by the end of the 19th century and early 20th century, tafsirs, i.e., interpretations from Muslim women, started coming. As per Picchi, in the context of Muslim women, when the first wave of feminism came, secular as well as religiously more inclined, both groups of women began using religious arguments to propagate their claims. However, access to modernist religious education of the first generation of Muslim feminist women was limited, and they had to largely rely on arguments forwarded by scholarly modernist men. For that reason, with few exceptions, systematic rereading of Islamic texts was still missing in the efforts of the first batch of equality-seeking Muslim women. Effective gender egalitarian feminist Hermeneutics of Quranic literature started coming on literary horizons by the last quarter of the 20th century and started becoming noticeable by the 1990s across global Muslim corners. This process of Muslim feminist literary emancipation has been happening in considerable competition with revivalist Islamic tendencies, even some women scholars distancing themselves from feminist demands of equality sided with conservative views of accepting male dominance and patriarchal interpretations.

Since patriarchal culture inherent in classical interpretation produces a gender-biased interpretation, when the idea of gender equality and justice is brought into the Quranic interpretation, for feminists, by the end of the 20th century, gender equality and justice became quite a lively issue. Islamic feminist intellectuals began questioning gender biases in the interpretation of the Quran. They study the Quran and interpret Quranic verses from a feminist perspective. Criticism of gender bias in the view of classical interpretations gave birth to the Feminist Hermeneutic method for the interpretation of the Quran.

=== Prominent Islamic feminists ===
Picchi informs that Bauer (2015) and the Encyclopedia of Women and Islamic Cultures include several entries on women in conservative and feminist tafsir. Cooke 2001 encapsulates one of the early accounts of emerging Islamic feminism. Badran 2009 covers further matured levels of the field of Islamic feminism. Journal Hawwa, published by Brill since 2003, has covered many Muslim feminist articles. Kynsilehto (2008) includes effective capture of the debates surrounding the term and concepts of "Islamic feminism." Hidayatullah 2014 provides an excellent overview of Islamic feminist authorship in the West.

Islamic feminist figures who introduce feminist-based hermeneutics of the Qur'an can be categorized into two generations. The first generation is Riffat Hassan, Azizah Al-Hibri and Amina Wadud. The second generation is, Asma Barlas, Sa'diyya Shaikh and Kecia Ali. The first generation has contributed to the rise of feminist-based Qur'anic interpretations. This generation works as "Trailblazers" because, in producing their work, they are under tremendous pressure, experiencing male domination. Their work is nuanced against the patriarchal system with a hard and many personal experiences that show that they are oppressed. This generation is focused on their respective works; there is no quotation, quoting, or discussing the themes they discuss, and there is no mutual support for the views expressed.

The second generation emerged in 1990, triggered by an increase in the movement of women in the fight for women's human rights internationally, such as the World Women's Conference in Beijing in 1995 which gave birth to a commitment to build people through gender equality and the CEDAW (Convention on the elimination of all forms of discrimination against women) which gave birth to a commitment to eliminate discrimination against second generation thought is more moderate against the patriarchal system and they are mutually supportive and interrelated.

== Hermeneutics of Islamic feminism ==
Hermeneutics is more than interpretive principles or methods we resort to when immediate comprehension fails. Rather, hermeneutics is the art of understanding and of making oneself understood. The way this method works uses methodological steps and principles of modern hermeneutics theory. Hermeneutics of Feminism is relatively newer. The use of hermeneutics for the interpretation of the Quran is still debated. Some refused, while others supported. Contemporary Islamic scholars, encouraged by the awareness of the present reality and to meet scientific standards, support the use of hermeneutics as a method of interpreting the Quran.

Islamic feminist figures who developed their thoughts on the Quranic interpretation methodology, including Aminah Wadud, Musdah Mulia, Aysha A. Hidayatullah and Kecia Ali. Amina Wadud, through her Qur'an and Women, Rereading the Sacred Text from a Woman's Perspective, developed her thoughts on the methodology of Quranic interpretation. Wadud referred to contemporary Islamic thought, Fazlur Rahman, to dismantle the gender biases that colored the Quranic interpretation tradition so far. He dissected certain verses and keywords in the Quran that limited the role of women both individually and socially. When finding several aspects of gender equality and justice in the Quran, Wadud reinterpreted gender verses in the Quran from a woman's perspective without the stereotype created by the male interpretation framework. Wadud initiated feminist-based hermeneutics, a method of interpreting the Quran that refers to the idea of gender equality and justice and rejects the patriarchal system. Wadud criticized the classical interpretation, including the method, perspective, and contents. Then it offers a holistic interpretation of the Quran that considers all methods of interpretation of various social, political, cultural, moral and religious, life issues and women and solves problems comprehensively. Wadud shows the theoretical and methodological links between the interpretation of the Quran and the things that gave rise to it (who and how). Some of the focus of concentration, namely what the Quran says, how the Quran says it, what is said against the Quran and who says. Coupled with the current understanding, namely what has not been said. With feminist-based hermeneutics, Wadud reinterprets gender verses in the Quran and produces gender-just interpretations. Gender justice interpretation is not only in the text, but is practiced in social life. Amina Wadud's famous breakthrough was when Wadud became a priest and preacher on Friday prayers on March 18, 2005, at an Anglican church, at Synod House, Manhattan, New York. This Friday prayer was attended by approximately one hundred male and female worshipers. In Wadud's view, leadership in worship has been used as a support for political leadership, so that support must be broken down.

Aysha A. Hidayatullah is Islamic feminist figure who developed her thoughts on the methodology of interpretation through her work Feminist Edges of the Qur'an (2014). This Assistant Professor of the University of San Francisco presents a comprehensive analysis of contemporary feminist interpretations of the Quran. She combines feminist-based interpretations of the Quran from feminist figures and provides an important introduction to the field of feminist-based interpretation of the Quran. Aysha conducted an in-depth investigation and radical criticism of feminist-based Quranic interpretation methods and approaches.

Aysha put forward three feminist-based Quranic interpretation methods, namely: the method of historical contextualization, intratextuality and the paradigm of monotheism. The historical contextualization method is to interpret the Quran by paying attention to the context of time and the background of the verse or revelation (asbab al-nuzul). With this method distinguished particular and universal verses. The particular verses are applied to define the situation and condition of 7th Century Arab society and universal verses for all humans. Historical contextual methods place the role of history in giving birth to gender biases and biological essentialism in classical interpretations.

The intratextual reading method treats the Quran holistically, which is to track how linguistic forms are used throughout the Quranic text and compare one verse with another on the same theme. How to read the Quran with the intratextual method, which is not reading the verses one by one, but reading the verses in the same theme as a whole by referring to the Quranic principle of justice for all humans. Monotheism paradigm is related to the main concept of Islam, namely monotheism. Monotheism paradigm means the oneness of Allah and Allah cannot be divided or compared. In the monotheism paradigm that distinguishes gender (sexism) can be considered idolatrous, because all humans are caliphs on earth. If a woman is said to have an imperfect capacity, then this is clearly a mistake in understanding God's intention about humans as caliphs on earth. If women are seen as imperfect, women cannot fulfill their role as guardians of God. Thus, the monotheism paradigm is the basis of gender equality and justice.

The Islamic feminist figure from Indonesia who developed his thoughts on the interpretation methodology is Musdah Mulia through his work Indahnya Islam Menyuarakan kesetaraan dan Kedilan gender (2014). The Professor UIN Syarif Hidayatulah Jakarta is known as a persistent and consistent champion of gender equality and justice. In Indonesia, with regard to gender in religious life, the challenges are severe and the sensitivity is high. Musdah used gender bias in interpretation of the Quran and brought in the idea of gender equality and justice in interpretation. Musdah has long been aware that women are confined in theological prisons, due to gender biases in the interpretation of the Quran. Departing from the belief that human males and females are both khalifah fil ardh, Musdah interpreted the feminist-based Quran and produced feminist interpretations, including interpreting polygamy verses and reinterpreting the concept of nushuz in the Quranic verses. According to Musdah, polygamy denies women's humanity. The interpretation of the concept of nushuz is that the Quran commands only obey Allah and respect for husbands.

Kecia Ali, Professor of the Department of Religion at Boston University has written various books on gender in Islam that focus on Islamic law about women. Through his work, Sexual Ethics & Islam: Reflections on the Feminist Qur'an, Hadith and Jurisprudence (2012), Kecia Ali discusses sexual violence against women and shows a collision between morals and law. He is of the view that the verses of the Quran are interpreted by demeaning women, so it needs feminist reflection on the Quran and Hadith. Kecia Ali conducted a feminist reflection on the Quran and hadith and Islamic law, especially regarding marriage and sex and the problem of slavery in Islam. In the matter of marriage, Kecia Ali discussed dowry, divorce and misogyny toward women. According to Kecia Ali, a progressive approach to the Quranic text cannot be limited to the selective presentation of egalitarian verses in isolation from the context of the vast holy book. Such an approach would be futile, because the argument for gender equality is built by interpreting verses that are selective. He offers a method of jurisprudence, because legal experts will relate to the source of the text in a social context. The established law has the objective of interpretive action. According to Kecia Ali, understanding of the Quranic text must change every time according to social change.

=== Hermeneutical Islamic feminist works ===
- Amina Wadud, her work Qur'an and Women, Rereading the Sacred Text from a Woman's Perspective and Inside The Gender Jihad, Woman's Reform in Islam. This Islamic feminist figure and gender fighter from the United States developed her thoughts on the methodology of Quranic interpretation, she referred to contemporary Islamic thought, such as Fazlur Rahman. Wadud dismantled the gender bias that colors the Quranic interpretation tradition so far. She dissected certain verses and keywords in the Quran that limited the role of women both individually and socially. When finding several aspects of gender equality and justice in the Quran, Wadud reinterpreted gender verses in the Quran from a women's perspective without the stereotype created by the male interpretive framework. Wadud initiated feminist-based hermeneutics, a method of interpreting the Quran that refers to the idea of gender equality and justice and rejects the patriarchal system. Wadud criticizes classical interpretations, both methods, perspective and contents. She offers a holistic interpretation of the Quran that considers all methods of interpretation of the various problems of social, political, cultural, moral and religious life and women and solve problems comprehensively. Wadud shows the theoretical and methodological links between the interpretation of the Quran and the things that gave rise to it. With feminist-based hermeneutics, Wadud reinterprets gender verses in the Quran and produces gender-just interpretations. Gender justice interpretation is not only in the text but practiced in social life. Amina Wadud's very famous breakthrough was when Wadud became a priest and preacher on Friday prayers on March 18, 2005, at an Anglican church, at Synod House, Manhattan, New York. This Friday prayer was attended by approximately one hundred male and female worshipers. In Wadud's view, leadership in worship has been used as a support for political leadership, so that support must be broken down.
- Aysha A. Hidayatullah, her work Feminist Edges of the Qur'an (2014). This Assistant Professor of the University of San Francisco presents a comprehensive analysis of contemporary feminist interpretations of the Quran. She combines feminist-based interpretation of the Quran from feminist figures and provides an important introduction to the field of feminist-based interpretation of the Quran. Aysha conducted an in-depth investigation and radical criticism of feminist-based Quranic interpretation methods and approaches. Aysha suggested three feminist-based Quranic interpretation methods, namely: the method of historical contextualization, intratextuality and the monotheistic paradigm. The historical contextualization method is to interpret the Quran by paying attention to the context of time and the background of the verse or revelation (asbab al-nuzul). With this method distinguished particular and universal verses. The particular verses are applied to define the situation and condition of 7th Century Arab society and universal verses for all humans. Historical contextual methods place the role of history in giving birth to gender biases and biological essentialism in classical interpretations. The intratextual reading method treats the Quran holistically, which is to track how linguistic forms are used throughout the Quranic text and compare one verse with another on the same theme. How to read the Quran with the intratextual method, which is not reading the verses one by one, but reading the verses in the same theme as a whole by referring to the Quranic principle of justice for all humans. Monotheism paradigm is related to the main concept of Islam, namely monotheism. Monotheism paradigm means the oneness of Allah and Allah cannot be divided and compared. In the monotheism paradigm that distinguishes gender (sexism) can be considered idolatrous, because all humans are caliphs on earth. If a woman is said to have an imperfect capacity, then this is clearly a mistake in understanding God's intention about humans as caliphs on earth. If women are seen as imperfect, women cannot fulfill their role as guardians of God. Thus the monotheism paradigm is the basis of gender equality and justice.
- Siti Musdah Mulia, her work Kemuliaan Perempuan dalam Islam (2014). The Professor UIN Syarif Hidayatulah Jakarta is known as a persistent and consistent champion of gender equality and justice. He moves from ideas to action. In Indonesia, with regard to gender in religious life, the challenges are severe and the sensitivity is high. Musdah sued gender bias in interpretation of the Quran and brought in the idea of gender equality and justice in interpretation. Musdah has long been aware that women are confined in theological prisons, due to gender biases in the interpretation of the Quran. Departing from the belief that human beings, men and women are the same khalifah fil ardh, Musdah interpreted the Quran based on feminists and produced feminist interpretations, including interpreting polygamy verses and reinterpreting the concept of nushuz in the Quranic verse. According to Musdah, polygamy denies women's humanity. The interpretation of the concept of nushuz is that the Quran commands only obey Allah and respect for husbands.
- Asma Barlas, her work Believing woman in Islam: Unreading Patriarchal Interpretation of the Quran (2002. Barlas came from Pakistan and became the first woman in Pakistan during Ziaul Haq who worked for foreign service (1976). In looking at how Islam talks about women, Barlas uses two important arguments: historical arguments and hermeneutic arguments. What is meant by historical argument is the expression of the textual and sexual political character that develops among Islamic societies, especially the process that has produced interpretations in Islam that have a patriarchal tendency. While the hermeneutic argument is intended to find what she calls the epistemology of egalitarianism and antipatriarchal in the Quran. Barlas explains the character of the policemic text of the Quran and opens up various possibilities of meaning, as a criticism of a reductionist interpretation pattern in a patriarchal framework. Asma Barlas gave rise to a new epistemology by applying the principles of feminist-based hermeneutics in the interpretation of Quranic verses.
- Kecia Ali, her work Sexual Ethics & Islam: Feminist Reflections on Qur'an, Hadith and Jurisprudence (2012). The Professor of the Department of Religion at Boston University has written various books on gender in Islam focusing on Islamic law about women. Kecia Ali discusses sexual violence against women and shows a collision between morals and law. She is of the view that the verses of the Quran are interpreted by demeaning women, so it needs feminist reflection on the Quran and Hadith. Kecia Ali conducted a feminist reflection on the Quran and hadith and Islamic law, especially regarding marriage and sex and the problem of slavery in Islam. In the matter of marriage, Kecia Ali discussed dowry, divorce and misogyny toward women. According to Kecia Ali, a progressive approach to the Quranic text cannot be limited to the selective presentation of egalitarian verses in isolation from the context of the vast holy book. Such an approach would be futile, because the argument for gender equality is built by interpreting verses that are selective. This is where the jurisprudence method can be offered. Because legal experts will relate to the source of the text in a social context. The established law has the objective of interpretive action. According to Kecia Ali, understanding of the Quranic text must change every time according to social change.
- Mardety, her dissertation research, Hermeneutika Feminisme Menuju Tafsir Alquran Berkeadilan Gender (Refleksi Filosofis Terhadap Pemikiran Amina Wadud), Universitas Indonesia (2016). Hermeneutics of Feminism offered by Mardety is Quranic hermeneutics. Contemporary Islamic figures, such as Hasan Hanafi, Fazlur Rahman, Muhammad Arkoun, first introduced the Quranic hermeneutics, and offered various hermeneutics that favor social justice, but there is no hermeneutic method that favors gender justice. Then, feminist-based hermeneutics of the Quran emerged and sided with gender justice. Hermeneutics Feminism is compiled by formulating the thoughts of Islamic feminist figures who conduct studies on feminist-based hermeneutics of the Quran. Departing from gender bias in the classical interpretation of the Quran which makes women theological prisoners, then to free women need to reinterpret verses of the Quran. Gender bias is caused by methodological problems, for this reason Hermeneutics of Feminism is offered to the Quran. her book entitled Hermeneutika Feminisme Reformasi Gender dalam Islam was presented in May 2019 at the Anniversary of the Faculty of Philosophy at the University of Indonesia at Cemara 6, Central Jakarta. Published in Mitra Budaya Magazine No. 26 years XX / June 2019.

== The hermeneutics model of feminism ==
Gender bias in the interpretation of the Quran is caused by methodological problems. The classical interpretation method contains inequality of meaning and describes unfair gender relations. This is where Hermeneutics Feminism as an alternative method of interpretation of the Quran can be offered.

Hermeneutics Feminism is composed by formulating the thoughts of Islamic feminist figures regarding the methodology of Quranic interpretation. The formulation of the Hermeneutic model of Feminism can be explained in 5 schemes viz:

First, based on the perspectives of women. The experience of women in the interpretation of the Quran is one important thing. If the Quran is interpreted based on men's experience, then men's perceptions influence the position of interpretation of women.

Second, framed the theory of feminism. The theories of feminism which are centered on the idea of equality and gender justice become a framework for building hermeneutics of feminism. If critical hermeneutics is framed by critical theory, then Hermeneutics of Feminism is framed by feminism theory.

Third uses the historical contextualization method. Historical contextualization method, namely paying attention to the context of time and the background of the verse or revelation (asbab al-nuzul). This method aims to differentiate particular verses, namely verses to define the situation and condition of 7th Century Arab society and universal verses, namely verses for all humans.

Fourth, the intratextuality method. The application of the intratextuality method, is intended to develop a framework based on systematic thinking to correlate several verses that discuss the same theme so that it appears to be related in accordance with the verses of the Quran, rather than applying a single meaning to one verse.

Fifth, the monotheistic paradigm. To get a fair interpretation of women, we must return to the core teachings of the Quran, monotheism as a paradigm of interpretation of the Quran. The concept of monotheism recognizes the unity of God, His uniqueness and indivisibility. Tauhid is a key method in hermeneutic of feminism for the interpretation of the Quran and is a doctrine of God's incomparable unity. With the monotheism paradigm will be seen clearly, the difference in the Quran with its interpretation

== Understanding and addressing criticism ==
Aysha Hidaytullah through her hermeneutics in Feminist Edges of the Qur'an not only addresses criticism coming from conservative circles but also attempts honest peer review of Islamic Feminists.

Sadaf Jaffer in her research article points out 'Pakistani Atheist and Agnostic women' are very clear in their (online) autobiographies that, they appeal to alternative sources of ethical values based on humanism and constraining in 'Islamic' is fundamentally flawed in its assumptions and projection of identities.

== See also ==
- Feminist theory
- Gender roles in Islam
- Hermeneutics
- Islamic feminism
- Islamic feminist views on dress codes
- Liberalism and progressivism within Islam
  - List of Muslim feminists
- Musawah
- Women in Islam
- Women's Islamic Initiative in Spirituality and Equality
- Women in the Quran

== Works cited ==
- Ali, Kecia (2006). Sexual Ethics And Islam: Feminist Reflections on Qur'an, Hadith, and Jurisprudence (First ed.). Boston: Oneworld Publications. ISBN 978-1851684564.
- Hidayatullah, Aysha A. (2014). Feminist Edges of The Qur'an. ISBN 978-0199359578.
- Irsyadunas, Irsyadunas (2014). Hermeneutika Feminisme dalam pemikiran tokoh Islam kontemporer (First ed.). Yogyakarta: Bantul Kaukaba Dipantara. p. 3.
- Mardinsyah, Mardety (2018). Hermeneutika Feminisme Reformasi Gender dalam Islam. Jakarta: bitread. ISBN 978-602-0721-72-9.
- Mulia, Musdah (2014). Kemuliaan Perempuan dalam Islam. Jakarta: PT. Elex Media Komputindo . ISBN 978-602-02-5326-8.
- Wadud, Amina (1999). Qur'an and Woman: Rereading the Sacred Text from a Woman's Perspective Paperback (Reprint ed.). Inggris: Oxford University Press. ISBN 978-0195128369.
