= Muslim feminist views on hijab =

Women dress codes and Islam

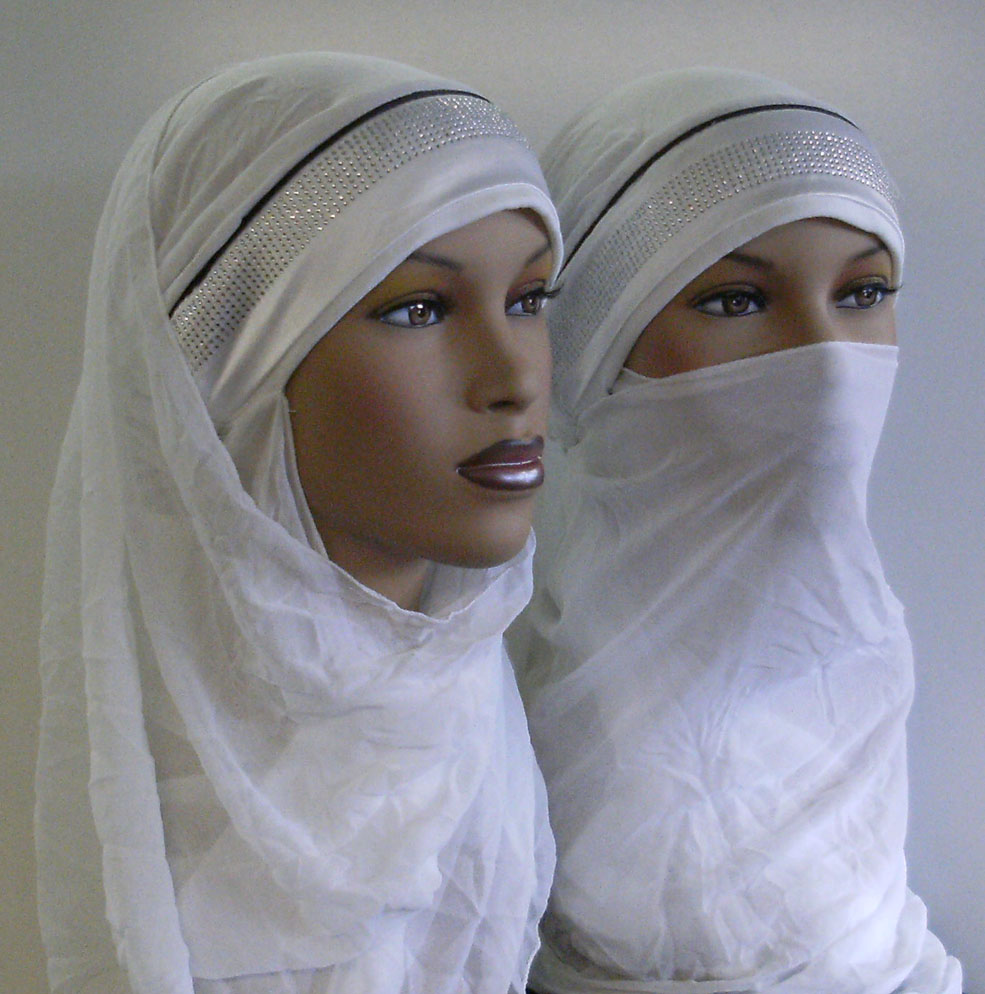
Hijab and Niqab on mannequin heads

Islamic feminist views on dress codes include views on issues surrounding women's dress codes in Islam, especially on the hijab, chador, niqāb, and burqa. There are mixed opinions among Muslim feminists regarding the merits of veiling.

== Quran ==
The Qur'an states that men and women should be dressed modestly (33:59-60, 24:30-31; in translation by Ali, 1988, 1126–27). However, it does not use the words veil, hijab, burqa, chador, or abaya. Instead, it uses the words jilbab (cloak) and khumur (shawl). These garments do not cover the face, hands, or feet.

=== Interpretations ===
Interpretations of how women should dress vary according to different cultures, geographic areas, and sects of Islam. Sufi groups such as Al-Ahbash, for example, do not make it mandatory for women to wear traditional Islamic clothing, even allowing jeans.

== Views favoring hijab ==
Some Muslim feminists see the veil as a symbol of Islamic freedom or otherwise attribute a personalized meaning to it.

Feminists such as Leila Ahmed say the veil no longer represents "a woman's brainwashed submissiveness or at the very least her lack of choice," and note that many American Muslims have worn the hijab to show opposition to anti-Muslim discrimination following the September 11 attacks or to show solidarity with Palestine.

Some feminists link the freedom to wear the hijab to women having a right over their own body. Feminist philosophers such as Luce Irigaray note that the veil can take on the role of empowerment regarding women's sexual difference from men. Publicist Nadiya Takolia adopted the hijab after becoming a feminist, saying the hijab "is not about protection from men's lusts," but about "telling the world that my femininity is not available for public consumption...and I don't want to be part of a system that reduces and demeans women."

One view of modern Muslim feminism holds that a woman's freedom of choice is of paramount importance, and that she should be able to choose whether to wear the veil or not without being coerced or threatened. This view focuses on a personal expression of Islamic faith, holding that Muslim women should be able to define dress codes for themselves and what they deem to personally empower them.

World Hijab Day, started by Bangladeshi-American Nazma Khan, is a popular annual event.

== Views opposing hijab ==
A section of Muslim feminists, including Fadela Amara and Hédi M'henni, do support bans on the hijab, claiming it inherently represents a subjugation of women. Amara supported France's ban of the garment in public buildings, saying "the veil is the visible symbol of the subjugation of women, and therefore has no place in the mixed, secular spaces of France's public school system." She also pointed to feminists in Algeria who had fought against wearing the veil, accusing those who criticized the ban as participating in neocolonialism. Mhenni expressed support for Tunisia's ban on the veil on similar grounds, claiming that acceptance of the veil would lead to acceptance of women's rights being limited.

Sihem Habchi, director of the French feminist movement Ni Putes Ni Soumises, also expressed support for France's ban on the burqa in public places, stating that the ban was a matter of "democratic principle" and protects French women from the "obscurantist, fascist, right-wing movement" that she said the burqa represented.

== See also ==
- Awrah
- Haya (Islam)
- Hermeneutics of feminism in Islam
- Hijab by country
- Islamism
- Islamic veiling practices by country
- Nazira Zain al-Din
- Political Islam
- Purdah
- Types of hijab

== Bibliography ==
- Hammad, Amber (2021). Hammad, Amber (2021) Unveiling The Veil: Self-Representation in Contemporary Muslim Female Art (Thesis). UNSW Sydney. doi:10.26190/unsworks/2038. hdl:1959.4/100128.
