= Rape in France =

Sexual violence in France

In France, both rape and marital rape are illegal. In recent years there has been increase of reported rape cases in France.

== Studies ==
Rape has been documented across French history. Georges Vigarello in his 2001 book writes about the history of rape in France, highlighting events from 16th to 20th century. He states that rape has historically been seen as a form of violence, but not punished as such.

== Statistics ==
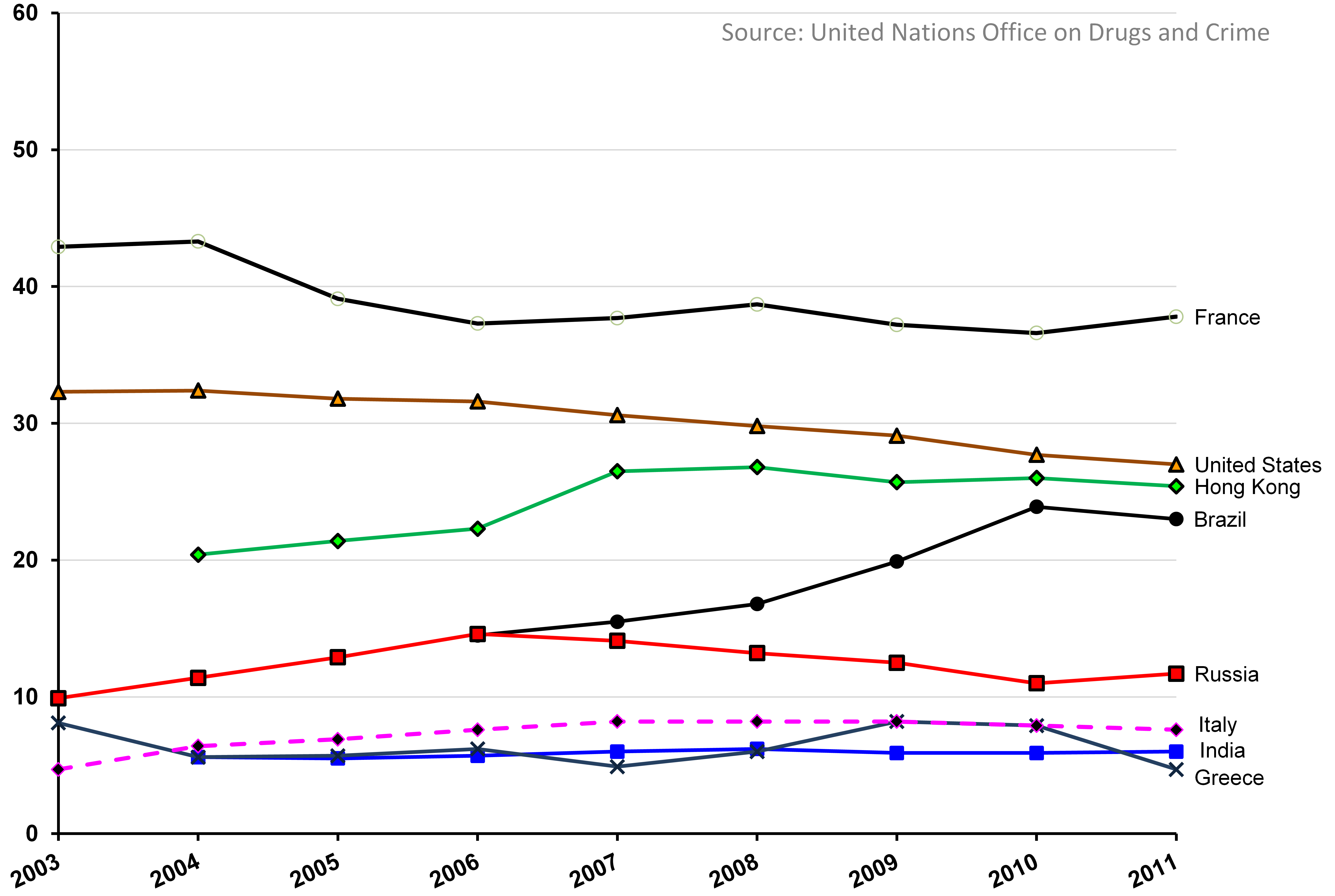
Annual rape and all forms of sexual assaults per 100,000 people.

In 1971, the rate of declared rapes stood at 2.0 per 100,000 people. In 1995, it was 12.5. In 2009, it stood at 16.2.

According to a 2012 report, about 75,000 rapes take place each year. In 2012, there were 1,293 reported rapes in a population of 66 million, and 1,188 rapes in 2013 in a population of 66 million.

In 2015, rape rate for France was 20.1 cases per 100,000 population. Rape rate of France increased from 15.9 cases per 100,000 population in 2006 to 20.1 cases per 100,000 population in 2015 growing at an average annual rate of 2.72%.

== Marital rape ==
The Court of Cassation authorized prosecution of spouses for rape or sexual assault in 1990. In 1992, the Court of Cassation convicted a man of the rape of his wife, stating that the presumption that spouses have consented to sexual acts that occur within marriage is only valid when the contrary is not proven. In 1994, Law 94-89 criminalised marital rape; a second law, passed 4 April 2006, makes rape by a partner an aggravating circumstance in prosecuting rape. In 2025, the European Court of Human Rights ruled in H.W. v. France that under French law and the European Convention on Human Rights, "marital duties" do not and cannot include an obligation to have sex with one's spouse without one's consent (which is not presumed to exist within marriage), overruling earlier case law from lower courts in France.

== Gang rape ==
According to a 2014 report, about 5,000 to 7,000 of the rapes are gang rapes. Gang-rapes are referred to as tournantes, or "pass-arounds". One of the first people to bring public attention to the culture of gang rape was Samira Bellil, who published a book called Dans l'enfer des tournantes ("In Gang Rape Hell").

== Notable offenders ==
- Gilles de Rais (c. 1405 – 1440) - Convicted of rape, murder and torture, he was executed.
- Pierre Chanal (1946–2003) - French soldier, convicted of rape and kidnapping, he received a ten-year jail sentence.
- Émile Louis (1934–2013) - Sentenced to life imprisonment in 2004.
- Michel Fourniret (1942–2021) - Convicted in 1987 for rape, and assault of minors.
- Joseph Vacher (1869–1898) - Convicted of murder, rape. Executed in December 1898.
- Roman Polanski (1933–) - Actor, convicted of raping a 13-year-old.
- Guy Georges (1962–) - Raped and murdered about seven women. Sentenced to life imprisonment in 2001.
- Dominique Pelicot (1952–) - Repeatedly drugged and raped his wife over nearly a decade, and invited dozens of men to rape her while she was unconscious. In September 2024 he went on trial along with 50 other men. He was found guilty of the aggravated rape of his wife and the attempted aggravated rape of a co-defendant's wife and sentenced to 20 years in prison. All his co-defendants were found guilty of aggravated rape, attempted rape or sexual assault.
- Gerald Marie was married to Linda Evangelista - the famous supermodel - but when his wife was out of town, Carrie Sutton says she was sexually assaulted by the French agent "sometimes several times a week" over multiple weeks in 1986. There is no suggestion Evangelista - who divorced Marie in 1993 - knew of the alleged abuse. She issued a statement in 2020 praising the "courage and strength" of her former partner's accusers, saying: "Hearing them now, and based on my own experiences, I believe that they are telling the truth."

== See also ==
- Abortion in France
- Dans l'enfer des tournantes ("In Gang Rape Hell")
- Feminism in France
- Human rights in France
- LGBT rights in France
- Ministry of Women's Rights (France)
- Ni Putes Ni Soumises
- Rape of males
- Women's rights

General:

- Crime in France
