= Sihem Habchi =

Sihem Habchi (born 9 May 1975 in Constantine, Algeria) has been the presiding president of Ni Putes Ni Soumises (Neither Whores nor Submitted) since June 2007, and is a member of the High Authority of the Battle against Discrimination and for Equality (HALDE).

== Biography ==
Born of Algerian immigrant parents, Sihem Habchi followed a course of study in secondary school and university that primarily involved linguistics and multimedia. She obtained a specialized degree in the field of multimedia at the Pierre-et-Marie-Curie University in Paris, in 2001. After having taught French abroad to an audience predominately made up of women undergoing rehabilitation, she launched into multimedia production and oriented her research toward educational methods and multimedia directed at children.

== Political activism and Ni Putes Ni Soumises ==
In March 2003, like thousands of French women and men, she joined the women’s March for equality and against the ghetto. For five weeks, through 23 cities, and under the deliberately provocative slogan “Neither Whores nor Submissives,” five women and two men called for public attention and action regarding the condition of girls in poor neighbourhoods. The March commenced symbolically in Vitry-sur-Seine where the young Sohanne, victim of misogyny, was burned alive in a dumpster in a Balzac city neighbourhood. This first march obtained its objective: to break the silence, as evident of the more than 30,000 people who turned out to march behind the “Ni Putes Ni Soumises” banner, until the annual International Women's Day, 8 March 2003.

Sihem Habchi told her story and that of the myriad women with whom she had grown up. All, like her, had known constant discrimination which victimized young boys and girls. It was for these many reasons, as well as due to a great desire to set off change in society, that Sihem Habchi joined Fadela Amara and her team in April 2003. She was one of 14 “Mariannes of Today”, displayed on the face of the National Assembly from 12 July to 31 August 2003. This exposition was highly symbolic in terms of identification with republican values. The natural and frank portraits of young “black, white, and North African” women paid homage to Marianne, the rebellious French heroine devoted to equality and fraternity.

=== Directorship of Ni Putes Ni Soumises ===
Sihem Habchi offered her talents to the creation of the Guide to Respect, sold today to 100,000 copies throughout France (a European version is currently under way), as the march allowed for the collection of thousands of stories of girls and boys in pain.

In September 2003, Sihem Habchi took the position of vice-president of the Ni Putes Ni Soumises movement. She was responsible for the Multimedia Department, for networking and international relations.

In February and March 2004, during the national debate over secularism, she participated in the “Tour de France Republicain” to move the focus of the debate beyond the spheres of politics, media, and academia. She led over 100 public meetings before audiences of close to 1,000 persons, often at risk to verbal and physical threats.

In October 2004, the Ni Putes Ni Soumises movement received women from all over the world (Saudi Arabia, Germany, the Netherlands, the United States, Morocco, Algeria...) who came to argue for the necessity of solidarity at the hour of growing religious fundamentalism and patriarchal regimes looking to suppress the emancipation of women. Her role as vice-president, charged with dealing with international relations, allowed for the creation of NPNS committees in Spain, Sweden, Switzerland, and Belgium.

During her participation in numerous international conferences she stressed the dangers of religious shifts, cultural relativism and communitarianism.

On International Women’s Day, 8 March 2005, NPNS collaborated with a number of grassroots associations and personalities to launch a call “For a new feminism” which emphasized the necessity to promote equality, secularism (la laicité) and diversity to ensure the emancipation of all individuals. This collective also denounced communitarianism linked with any sort of particular cultural belief which, in the name of the “relative” liberty of choice, led to subjection and imprisonment.

In 2006, Sihem Habchi participated in the development of the House of “Mixité” (diversity), inaugurated 8 March 2006, in the presence of ex-French President Jacques Chirac. In 2007, thanks to her actions in New York as vice-president of Ni Putes Ni Soumises, the movement was granted consultative status to the United Nations, which made it a privileged representative on the international scene.

=== President of the movement ===
On 23 June 2007, Habchi was elected president of the movement by the National Council of Ni Putes Ni Soumises. She replaced Fadela Amara, who was nominated to the Secretary of State under the Minister Fillon II administration. Sihem Habchi left soon after for Pakistan to support the ex-minister Nilofar Bakhtiar, who had been threatened with a fatwa. Since 2007, Sihem Habchi has not ceased to defend women victims of obscurantism throughout the world: she has met with Ayaan Hirsi Ali, Naeema Moghul, Nawal Saadawi, Taslima Nasrin, and many others. On 24 November 2008, Habchi addressed a letter to Nicolas Sarkozy, current French president, to demand he commit to the national cause to end violence against women. To solidify this demand, Ni Putes Ni Soumises initiated a collective of associations.

In October 2011, 8 out of the 9 employees of Ni Putes Ni Soumises went on strike to protest against what they called Sihem's Habchi "tyrannical" and "despotic" behaviour; they also accused her of using the movement's money for her personal use. After weeks of protest, Sihem Habchi finally resigned in November 2011.

=== The HALDE Institute ===
In July 2007, some days after being elected to the position of president of Ni Putes Ni Soumises, Sihem Habchi was nominated by Bernard Accoyer, president of the National Assembly, to the HALDE Institute (The High Authority of the Battle against Discrimination and for Equality).
