= Gang rape =

Rape of a single victim by two or more violators

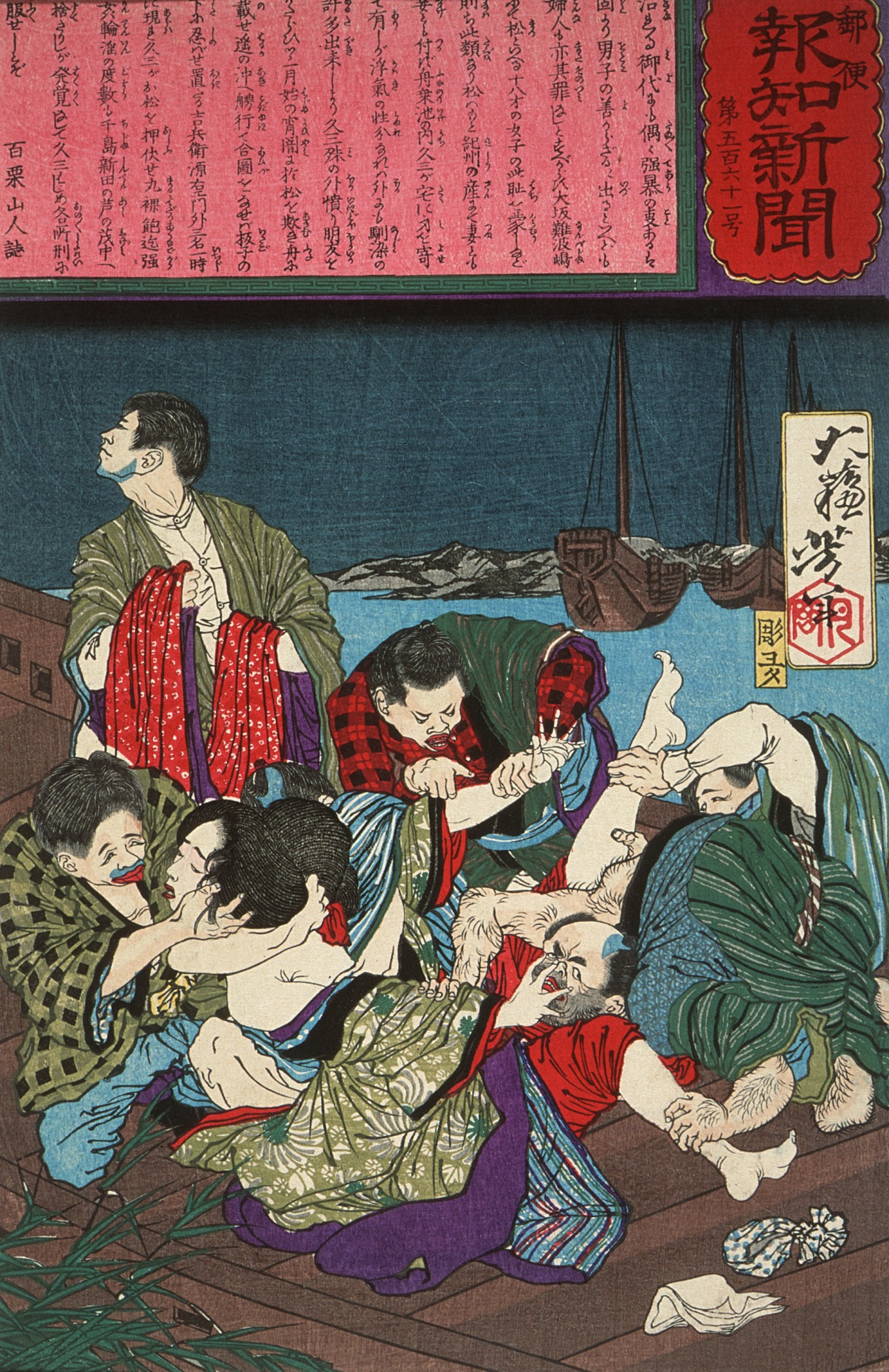
19th century illustration by Tsukioka Yoshitoshi, illustrating a gang rape case on The Postal News (Sports Hochi today)

In scholarly literature and criminology, gang rape, also called serial gang rape, party rape, group rape, or multiple perpetrator rape, is the rape of a single victim by two or more violators. Gang rapes are forged on shared identity, religion, ethnic group, or race. There are multiple motives for serial gang rapes, such as for sexual entitlement, asserting sexual prowess, or punishment.

Gang rapes often occur during warfare, ethnic cleansing, and genocide.

== Gang rape in literature ==
=== Hebrew Bible ===
The Hebrew Bible documents two narratives of gang rapes: the infamous account of Sodom (Genesis 19:4–11) and the story of the Levite Concubine in Gibeah, (Judges 20–21) which is presented as a doublet with mimicking literary structure to the former. Both instances result in the judgement of God through destruction and war respectively.

== Perpetrator characteristics ==
Gang rapes are typically perpetrated by men, two or more, and tend to have somewhat different characteristics than rapes by individuals. For instance, gang rapists tend to be younger and are more often repeat offenders, and the gang is more likely to be under the influence of drugs or alcohol.

Gang rapes are more violent on average compared to its individual counterpart, with significantly more severe sexual and non-sexual injuries to the victim. The gang members also typically dehumanize the victim more before and during the rape. Gang rapes are almost always premeditated in their intent, target victim(s), social proof, and psychological causes. Social factors such as civil wars, hate propaganda, and ethnic conflicts increase the rate of gang rape.

Rape gang members often have a binding force such as the same race, or place of residence thereby forming a close-knit peer pressure group, encouraged by the behavior of their fellow criminals. Gang rape can result from a group form of criminal spin, in which the group starts with less serious offenses which ultimately lead them to go well beyond their initial intention.

In a 2013 study based on 25-year crime data from US and Europe, between 10% and 20% of all rapes were gang rapes. Fewer than one in three gang rapes are reported, while fewer than 1 in 20 attempted but failed gang rapes are reported.

== Motives ==
=== Sexual entitlement and entertainment ===
A 2013 Lancet report found that among the motives for rape were sexual entitlement and seeking of entertainment. Associated factors in the crime included alcohol misuse, poverty, personal history of childhood victimization, need to prove heterosexual performance, dominance over women, and participation in gangs and related activities. As of September 2013, according to the report, most cases were not reported to law enforcement, and just 23% of single or multiple perpetrator rapes that were reported by the victims ended in prison sentence. The 1886 Mount Rennie rape case in Sydney, Australia falls in this category.

=== As an act of war ===
Gang rapes during civil wars and ethnic riots take added dimension of becoming a means of revenge, sending a message to the victims' community, inducing fear in opponents or creating a sense of solidarity among the rapists. At least 20,000 women were raped or gang raped and afterwards killed by the Imperial Japanese Army during the Nanjing Massacre during the Second Sino-Japanese War. Major ethnic conflicts and wars since World War II have witnessed several campaigns of gang rapes. Rapes by Soviet soldiers and the Mahmudiyah rape and killings by five United States Army soldiers are examples of such war crimes.

The Kivu conflict in the Democratic Republic of the Congo saw thousands of gang rapes every week, with each relief center reporting 10 or more daily victims of gang rape with battering of women. The Rwandan genocide of 1994 witnessed numerous gang rapes by soldiers. The Bosnian War during the 1990s saw a similar campaign of gang rapes. In the 1990s, the Kashmir region which was a battlefield between Muslim militant groups and Indian security forces also saw a number of gang rapes which were perpetrated by both sides of the conflict to instill fear in the population of the opposing side. In the 2000s, civil war-torn countries such as Sudan, Afghanistan and Syria reported high rates of gang rapes by government security forces, insurgents, and militias. Similar incidents have been recorded in Libya, and Mali.

During the Russo-Ukrainian War, especially after the start of the full-scale Russian invasion, numerous cases of gang rapes of Ukrainian women and men, including children, by Russian soldiers were recorded. During the October 7 attacks, Israel alleges that Palestinian militants committed gang rapes against Israeli women and men. In the subsequent Israeli invasion of the Gaza Strip, dozens of alleged cases of sexual assault, including gang rapes, by Israeli security forces against Palestinian detainees of all ages—both male and female—were reported by the detainees.

=== As punishment ===
A 2013 Lancet report on rape and gang rape in Bangladesh, China, Cambodia, Indonesia, Papua New Guinea, and Sri Lanka found that the crime was committed for various motives, including as a means to inflict punishment on the victim.

Traditionally, the Cheyenne people of North America used gang rape as punishment for female transgressions. A similar practice existed among the Munduruku people of South America.

In the Mpumalanga province of South Africa, there are instances of gang rape as punishment. In Argentina and Pakistan, gang rape has been reported to have been ordered as punishment.

=== Religious or racial factors ===
Though having the same race or religion often acts as a binding force for creating a close-knit serial rape gangs, studies reported that 30% of these shared-identity rape gangs specifically targeted people of another religion or race.

== Gang rape by country ==
This is an incomplete list of countries, where government or media have acknowledged the problem of gang rape.

A study found that gang rapes involved more alcohol and drug use, night attacks and severe sexual assault outcomes and less victim resistance and fewer weapons than individual rapes. Another study found that group sexual assaults were more violent and had greater resistance from the victim than individual sexual assaults and that victims of group sexual assaults were more likely to seek crisis and police services, to contemplate suicide and seek psychotherapy than those involved in individual assaults. The two groups were about the same in the amount of drug use and drinking during the assault.

Porter and Alison have analyzed 739 gang rape cases from US and UK, and found over 20% of the gang rape victims died from injuries from the gang rape. Gang rape is sometimes stereotyped in media as a crime of poor, minorities, or culture; however, gang rape incidence rates are high in wealthy college campuses, among non-minorities and every culture.

=== Australia ===
Gang rape has been a historical and ongoing issue in Australia, with several high-profile cases receiving significant media and political attention over the years.

=== Bangladesh ===
A 2013 Lancet study reports 1.9% of all rural men in Bangladesh have committed multiple perpetrator rape (gang rape) of a woman who was not a partner, compared to 1.4% urban men. 35% of those who have committed gang rapes against women have also committed additional rapes where the victim was a man. The motives of rape included a combination of reasons. Two thirds of the gang rape perpetrators claimed entertainment as their motive, 30% claimed they participated in gang rape out of anger and to inflict punishment on the victim, while 11% indicated the crime followed alcohol consumption.

=== Brazil ===
In the state of Rio de Janeiro alone, over 6,000 rapes are reported every year (or about 37 per 100,000 people). Nationwide, the rape rate varied between 26 and 32 per 100,000 women in 2009. The arrest rates on rape complaints, was 4% in Rio. About 19.6% of 2011 rapes were gang rapes. In 2016, more than 30 men drugged and gang raped a 16-year-old girl and later posted photos and a video to boast about it online.

=== Canada ===
Peer pressure and sexual aggression are among the cited reasons for the crime. Since 1983, Canada does not track rape or gang rape statistics separately, but tracks and reports Sexual Assault Tier 3 which includes both rape and gang rape. The average Sexual Assault Tier 3 victim rate in Canada was 15 per 100,000 women, according to a 2013 Statistics Canada article about violence against women.

=== China ===
A Lancet study reports, in an online survey of 980 Chinese men, 2.2% of them admitted to having committed gang rape (multiple perpetrator rape) of a non-partner woman. About 36% of the perpetrators had raped more than one woman, 50% of those who had committed gang rape had raped both one partner as a single perpetrator as well as a non-partner during a gang rape, while 32% had gang raped a woman and raped a man. The study also found that 90% of the rapists were in the 15–29 age group at the time they perpetrated the first rape.

In July 2013, Li Tianyi, the son of a renowned Chinese military singer Li Shuangjiang, was charged with four other men to being part of a gang rape. This case raised significant public anger over seemingly privileged treatment of elite gang rape criminals.

=== Egypt ===
Over two dozen gang rapes were reported during civil protests in Egypt from January to March 2013; however, activists claim that many more gang rapes often go unreported because most women are too ashamed to go to the police or even tell their relatives.

During July 2013 at Tahrir Square, mobs assaulted and gang raped at least 46 women in 4 days. A Dutch journalist was also gang-raped in Tahrir Square. A similar gang rape and gang beating was reported by an American journalist in 2011. In a separate survey, over 90% of Egyptian women claimed to have experienced sexual violence in their lifetime.

=== France ===
Between 5000 and 7000 gang rapes are reported in France every year.

In banlieues organised gang-rapes are referred to as tournantes, or "pass-arounds". One of the first people to bring public attention to the culture of gang rape was Samira Bellil, who published a book called Dans l'enfer des tournantes ("In Gang Rape Hell").

In October 2012, two girls in Fontenay-sous-Bois on the outskirts of Paris reported experiencing daily gang rapes in the high-rise tower blocks, sometimes by scores of boys. One witness described 50 boys "queuing" to rape her. 10 of the 14 defendants who were minors at the time of gang rape were acquitted, while the remaining 4 adults found guilty were given 0 to 12 months in prison. This case shocked the country. In 2014, the case of a Canadian tourist allegedly gang raped by four police officers in Paris received international attention.

In 2024, during the Summer Olympics, an Australian woman was raped on a Paris street by five men. The 25-year-old woman with a partially torn dress took refuge in a kebab shop in the Pigalle district after the incident.

=== Germany ===
Several high-profile gang rape cases in Germany have become subjects of significant public and political controversy, primarily due to issues surrounding the perpetrators' migrant status, debates over lenient sentencing for minors, and discussions about German laws on hate speech. According to statistics, 53% of suspects in gang rape in Germany were foreigners, raising concern regarding migrants.

=== India ===
As with other countries, India does not collect separate data on gang rapes. Rapes are also suggested to be underreported.

The gang rape and murder of a 23-year-old student on a public bus, on 16 December 2012 has focused international attention on India's legal system, especially laws pertaining to the protection of women. It sparked large protests across the capital of India, Delhi. Several other case of child gang rapes have been also reported, such as the Kathua rape case. The large scale protests resulted in amendments in rape laws in India by way of Criminal Law (Amendment) Act, 2013 and formation of "The Nirbhaya Fund", designed to be used for schemes by different states to ensure women's safety and security at public places, a one-stop centre for their grievances, a helpline and other measures. There have been reports of gang rape of tourists in India like the Jharkhand tourist rape case.

During the instability of the heavily political and wartime era of the Maratha Confederacy in the 18th century, the soldiers of the large Maratha armies engaged in wartime sexual violence against women during their campaigns in all corners of India. (Note: Which includes North India, South India, Tanjore, Goa, Gujarat and Bengal) Upon the spotting of a beautiful woman, up to five or six soldiers would violate her. Women threw themselves to suicide to avoid such a fate and those who resisted had their breasts cut off.

=== Indonesia ===
Reported cases of gang rape include Jakarta International School gang rape of a six-year-old, gang rape of a Malaysian student in Indonesia, and the Aceh gang rape case where the victim was charged with adultery when she reported the crime.

A Lancet study of Jakarta and Jayapura city on New Guinea island, found gang rape prevalence rate to be 2% and 6.8% of all Indonesian men respectively who, at some point in their lifetime, have committed multiple perpetrator rape. About 52% of the perpetrators had raped more than one woman, 64% of those who had committed gang rape had raped both partner as single perpetrator as well as non-partner during a gang rape, while 12% had gang raped a woman and raped a man. The study also found that 90% of the rapists in Indonesia were in the 15–29 age group when they committed their first rape.

=== Iran ===
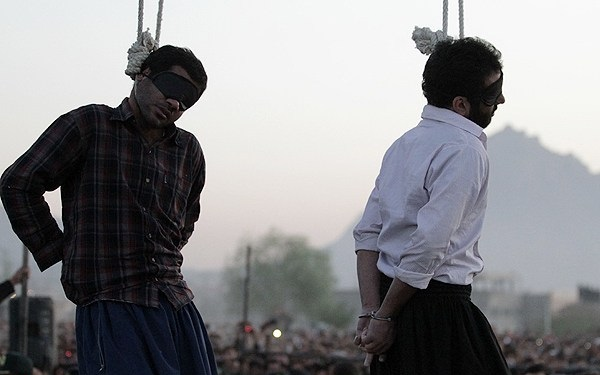
Public execution of Khomeyni Shahr gang rape case convicts (Iran)

Many incidents of gang rapes have been reported in Iran. In several cases, the police officials have blamed the victim for not wearing hijab, and in one case arresting the victim and two activists, who were trying to bring attention to the gang rape.

While official statistics on reported and pending gang rapes in Iran are not published by the Iranian government, public hangings for gang rapes are routinely reported in Iranian newspapers.

=== Israel ===
In July 2024, five IDF soldiers gang raped a Palestinian detainee from Gaza in the Sde Teiman detention camp, which was partially caught on cctv. Due to "exceptional circumstances", the charges for the soldiers were dropped. The victim was stabbed in the rectum, and suffered severe injuries to the lungs and ribs.

=== Japan ===
The 1995 Okinawa rape incident involved the abduction and gang rape of a 12-year-old Okinawan schoolgirl by three U.S. servicemen. The crime, and the subsequent handling of the suspects, sparked massive protests and a diplomatic crisis between the United States and Japan.

=== Malaysia ===
A 15-year-old schoolgirl in Ketereh, Kelantan, was gang raped by more than 30 men. Malaysia reported about 3,000 rape cases in 2012, a rape incidence rate of about 10.7 rapes per 100,000 people. About 52% of these victims were less than 16 years old. Like other nations, Malaysia does not segregate rape and gang rape cases.

=== Nigeria ===
Nigeria reports thousands of gang rapes every year. In 2011, the ABSU gang rape, in which the gang videotaped their crime, drew widespread attention and protests inside Nigeria. The prevalence of group rape has been proposed as a significant contributor to spread of sexual diseases and AIDS.

=== Pakistan ===
The 2013 National Crime Data report for Pakistan suggest a current rape rate of 8.4 women per 100,000 population, of which about 10% were gang rapes.

In some cases, such as Mukhtar Mai gang rape in Muzaffargarh, village elder's council (jirga) in Pakistan have ordered that the girl in a family is gang-raped as a means of punishing her brother, and this punishment was then carried out in public with everyone watching. In 2011, Pakistan's Supreme Court freed 5 men who committed the gang-rape because their action was on orders of the village council. Other gang rape cases reported in 2013 include a Bahawalpur gang rape, a Lahore gang rape, a Peshawar gang rape, and the Karachi gang rape of a girl with polio, among others.

In 2018, a trans woman from Peshawar was kidnapped and raped by eleven men, who filmed the assault and shared it on social media.

Land, Gold and Women is a documentary about the conditions of typical women in rural Pakistan. It chronicles the traditional use of ritual gang rape as a method of social control. Central to the film are the stories of Mukhtar Mai, and Dr. Shazia Khalid.

=== Papua New Guinea ===
A Lancet study reports 14.1% of all men admitted to having committed gang rape (multiple perpetrator rape) of a non-partner woman sometime in their lifetime. 44% of these perpetrators had raped more than 1 woman over their lifetime. In Papua New Guinea, 25% of the first rape was committed at a juvenile age less than 15, while in 70% of the cases the perpetrator's age was 15–29 at the time of first crime.

=== Saudi Arabia ===
The Qatif rape case was a 2006 gang rape of a teenage girl by seven men. The case attracted international attention because the victim was initially ordered to receive 200 lashes but the ruling was overturned by the monarch after backlash.

=== South Africa ===
Gang rapes occur frequently in South Africa, and in certain parts it is called jackrolling. South Africa reported over 64,000 rapes in 2012, or about 127.5 women per 100,000 population. With one woman raped every 4 minutes, South Africa has world's highest rape incidence rate per 100,000 women. Between 10% and 33% of all rapes are gang rapes involving three or more people. About 25% of youth in Soweto (near Johannesburg) described gang rape as recreational and fun.

In certain parts of South Africa where boys are often involved in gang rapes, rape rates are higher. 40% of reported rape cases are on children below the age of 12. In February 2002, an eight-month-old infant was reportedly gang raped by four men. The infant has required extensive reconstructive surgery. A significant contributing factor for the escalation in child abuse is the widespread myth in HIV ravaged South Africa that having sex with a virgin will cure a man of AIDS.

Vogelman and Lewis report 44% of rapists in South Africa have engaged in gang rape. The National Institute of Crime Rehabilitation of South Africa claims only 1 out of 20 rapes are reported in South Africa, suggesting 1,300 women are raped every day. A 2010 nationwide survey reported that about 27% of all South African men above the age of 18 have raped a woman in their lifetime one or more times, while 8.9% of all adult men have participated in a gang rape. The gang rape prevalence rate varied significantly in different provinces of South Africa; for example, in Eastern Cape, 13.9% of men had gang raped a woman who was not a partner.

In April 1999, a female American UNICEF official visiting South Africa on business was gang raped during a robbery of the home where she was staying. In February 2013, a 17-year-old girl was gang raped, mutilated and left to die in a town near Cape Town. This led to widespread protests.^{[citation needed]}

=== South Korea ===
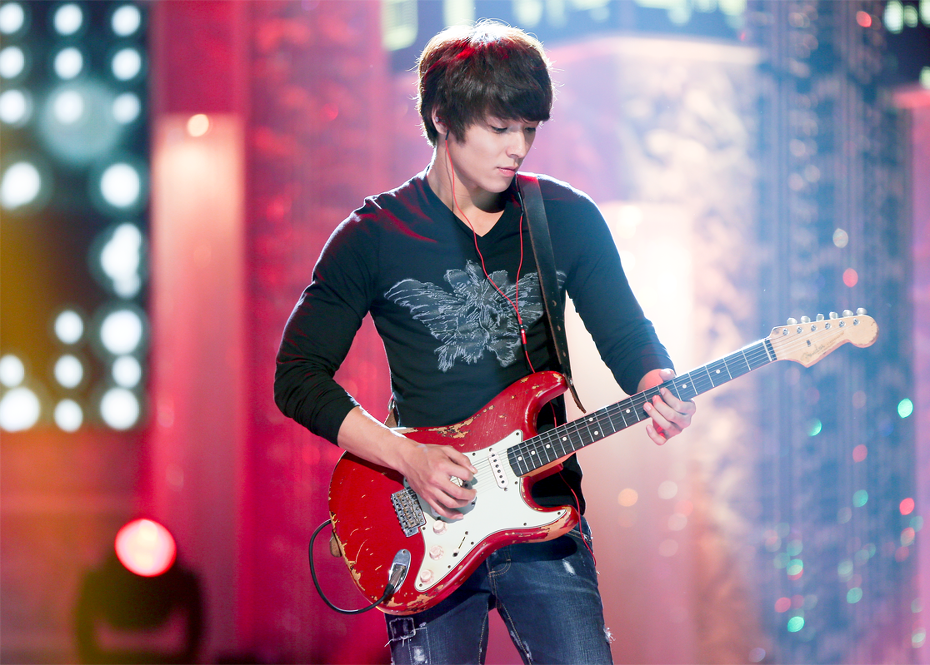
Korean pop idol Choi Jong-hoon was sentenced to 5 years in prison for gang-raping multiple women together with Jung Joon-young.

The Miryang gang rape was a series of gang rapes that occurred in Miryang, South Korea in 2004. As many as 120 male high school students gang raped female high-schoolers over the course of 11 months. The case caused a public outcry due to police mistreatment of the victims and the offenders' light punishments.

=== Spain ===
Reported gang rape cases include gang rape of a British tourist in Spain where one of the rapists (described by the victim as Arabic) was a 70-year-old man, and gang rape in Huelva of a 13-year-old girl with a mental disability. The La Manada rape case in 2016 led to significant public outcry.

=== Sri Lanka ===
The 2015 gang rape and murder of S. Vithiya in northern Sri Lanka prompted widespread, angry protests across the country, particularly in the Tamil homeland and the city of Jaffna.

=== Sweden ===
In 2013, Forskning & Framsteg (FoF), a Swedish popular science magazine, published an article reporting that "The evidence suggests that gang rapes in Sweden is increasing - despite the decline in violent crime in general." FoF went on to report that, "The increase, which primarily occurred in the 2000s, may have to do with "rape with multiple perpetrators" from 2004, classified as "serious crime", which means that more obscure cases fall into this category." FoF further reports that "National Council's investigator, Klara Hradilova-Selin, said that "developments could at least partly be interpreted in terms of an actual increase." Although there are a number of other important reasons why we are seeing more reports, such as, Klara Hradilova-Selin goes on to say, "more women dare to go the police" and an "increased alcohol consumption". Finally FoF goes on to report that in the 1990s "In the gang rape of three or more perpetrators 39 percent are foreign born." The statistics for gang rapes were not investigated by Swedish authorities after 2006.

On 21 January 2017, in Uppsala, Sweden, a group of Arab Facebook users allegedly gang-raped an unconscious woman for several hours. The crime was stopped when viewers of the Facebook live feed realized what was happening and phoned the police, who entered the apartment and interrupted the crime still in progress.

In March 2018, newspaper Expressen investigated gang rape court cases from the two preceding years and found that there were 43 men having been convicted. Their average age was 21 and 13 were under the age of 18 when the crime was committed. Of the convicted, 40 out of the 43 were either immigrants (born abroad) or born in Sweden to immigrant parents. Another investigation by newspaper Aftonbladet found that of 112 men and boys convicted for gang rape since July 2012, 82 were born outside Europe. The median age of the victims was 15, while 7 out of 10 perpetrators were between 15 and 20.

=== United Arab Emirates ===
In several cases in 2013, the courts of the UAE have sentenced the gang raped woman to prison under its laws. For example, a British woman, after she reported being gang raped by three men, was charged with the crime of drinking alcohol in UAE; an Arab woman was sentenced to one year in prison for illicit sex after she complained of gang rape; an Australian woman was similarly sentenced to jail after she reported gang rape in the UAE, while a Norwegian woman was jailed for illicit sex when she reported rape by Arab men. In another case, an 18-year Arab woman withdrew her complaint of gang rape inside a car by six men when the prosecution threatened her with a long jail term for consensual sex with multiple men.

According to ABC News, a French teenage boy was gang raped by three Dubai men. The authorities demanded that the tourist confess he is gay and that he asked for sex. The boy insisted he was raped and diplomatic pressure led to the arrest and conviction of the gang members.

=== United Kingdom ===
A number of gang rapes have taken place in the United Kingdom, although the UK authorities had not separately collected data on gang rapes until the 2011 Child Exploitation and Online Protection Centre report on localised grooming entitled "Out of Mind, Out of Sight", but which only deals with adolescent victims. However, Scotland Yard expressed concern in 2009 over the rise of 'gang sex attacks' in London, detailing an increase of 71 cases in 2003/2004 to 93 cases in 2008/2009.

Media reports of gang rapes in the UK are often racially charged since late 2000. This due to a particular pattern of repeated non-white perpetrated gang rapes in the metropolitan areas. The Rochdale sex trafficking gang would later epitomise the phenomenon. The Home Office report of 2013 described these cases as '[showing] a particular model... of organised, serious exploitation and abuse that involves predominantly Pakistani-heritage men grooming and abusing predominantly white British girls.' The report stresses that the Government does not believe 'localised grooming' is intrinsic of any culture, religion, and or race, despite acknowledging the phenomenon.

In March 2014, Crime Prevention Minister Norman Baker described "ground breaking work" to identify women and girls who can get drawn into gangs. "Girls associated with gangs can face sexual violence and we have provided £1.2m for 13 Young People's Advocates to support those at risk," he said on the launch of a report by the Centre for Social Justice (CSJ), a think-tank established in 2002 by Iain Duncan Smith, another Cabinet minister. Baker said the government had set up a network of more than 70 people with experience of dealing with gangs to work with 33 of the worst affected areas of the country, including 20 in London. In one case cited by the CSJ report, a schoolgirl was abducted and sexually assaulted by nine males because she criticised a gang member. The report found that girls as young as eight were being used to carry drugs while female gang members in their teens were being pressured to have sex with boys as young as 10 to initiate males into gangs. A 2014 report by the Office of the Children's Commissioner suggested that almost 2,500 children had been known to be victims of child sexual exploitation by gangs and groups.

In July 2018 Home Secretary Sajid Javid ordered research into the particular characteristics of grooming gangs. However, as of March 2020 this report has not been released with the Home Office claiming it is 'not in public interest' to release the findings.

=== United States ===
The US reports about 85,000 rapes a year, or an average of 27.3 rapes per 100,000 population. There is a rape in the US every 6.2 minutes. As with other countries, the US does not collect separate data on gang rapes; Vogelman and Lewis estimate 25% of all rapes in the US are gang rapes. Another source indicates 21.8% of American rapes are gang rapes. A Roger Williams University study estimates from survey of crime data that 16% of all male rapists in the US participated in a gang rape crime.

A 15-year-old girl in Chicago was gang raped on Facebook live in 2017 while watched by over 40 people. On a separate occasion, two teenage girls, one aged 15, the other aged 16, in La Crosse, Wisconsin, were gang raped by at least 11 men.

Some examples of gang rapes reported in local media in 2013 include the Cleveland, Texas gang rape, Richmond gang rape, Vanderbilt University gang rape, New Orleans gang rape, St Paul gang rape, Miami gang rape/murder, among others.

== Gang rape of animals by humans ==
Bestiality, involving intercourse between humans and non-human animals, is increasingly seen as a form of rape by animal advocates. In 2018, a pregnant goat in Maroda, India died after eight men gang raped her. The same year, a dog in Mumbai, India was gang raped by four men and died. In 2022, a Bengal monitor was allegedly gang raped and eaten by four men in Maharashtra, India.

== See also ==
- Fiction about gang rape
- Sodom and Gomorrah
- Types of rape
