= Ni Putes Ni Soumises =

French feminist organization (2002-)

The group's logo

Ni Putes Ni Soumises (which roughly translates as Neither Whores nor Submissives) is a French feminist movement, founded in 2002, which has secured the recognition of the French press and the National Assembly of France. It is generally dependent on public funding. It is also the name of a book written by Fadela Amara, one of the leaders of the movement, with the help of Le Monde journalist Sylvia Zappi.

In 2005 this movement inspired the creation of the similarly named Varken Hora eller Kuvad movement in Sweden.

Fadela Amara was appointed as junior minister for urban policy in François Fillon's first government in May 2007. She left the government in 2010, and was named France's inspector general for social affairs in January 2011.

NPNS was set up by a group of young French women, including Samira Bellil, in response to the violence being directed at them in the predominantly Muslim immigrant suburbs (banlieues) and public housing (cités) of cities such as Paris, Lyon and Toulouse, where organised gang-rapes are referred to as tournantes, or "pass-arounds".

== Goals ==
Ni Putes Ni Soumises fights against violence targeting women, including domestic violence and gang rape, as well as social pressures.

The movement's platform for victims of domestic violence helps women and their children escape dangerous situations and supports them in the rebuilding of their lives after the fact. Its support team is made up of lawyers, psychologists, an educational specialist and a legal counsel.

Ni Putes Ni Soumises also supports the White Ribbon Campaign, which runs from 25 November to 6 December every year, and uses this as an opportunity to promote 3919, the national domestic violence helpline.

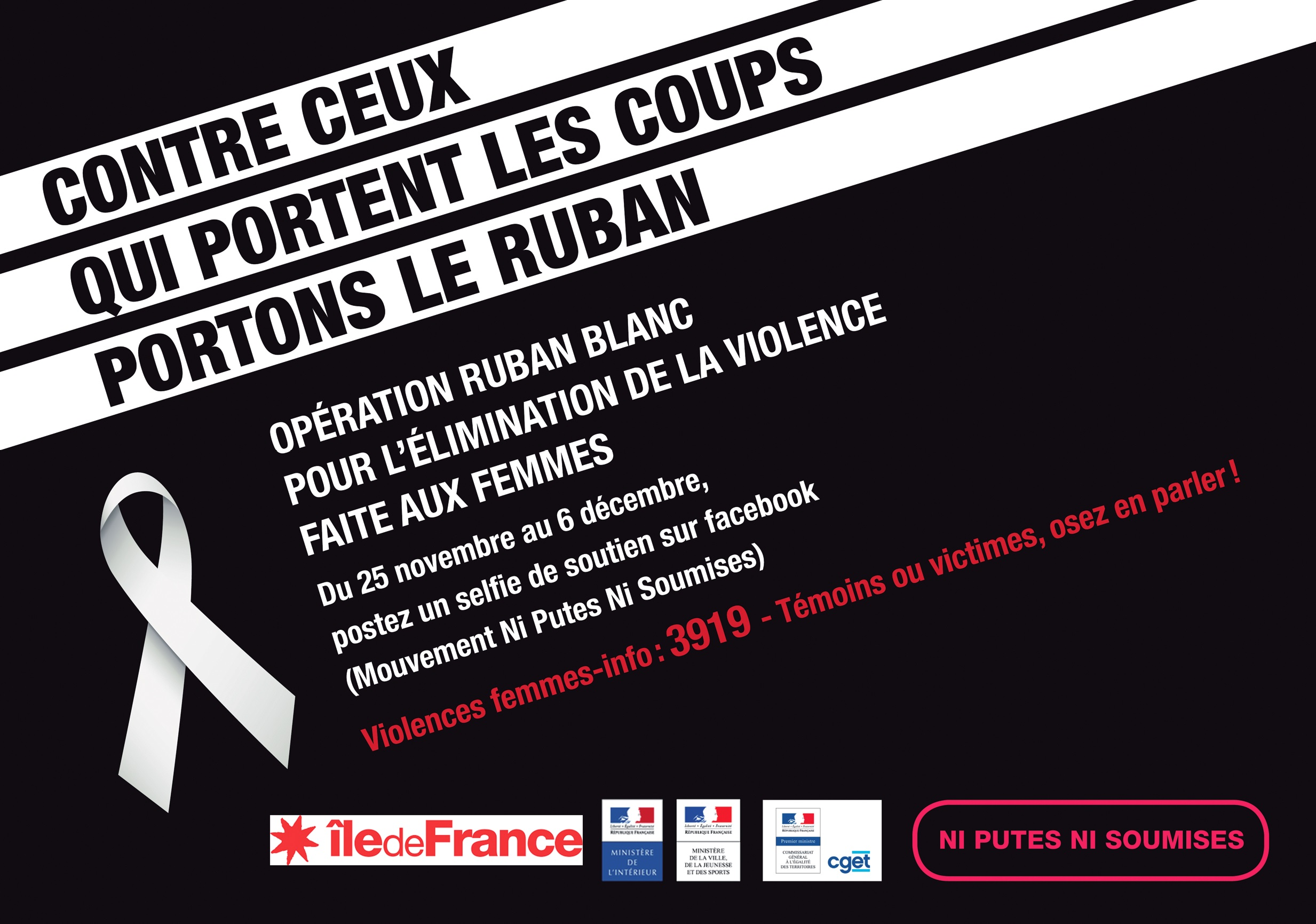
Ni Putes Ni Soumises White Ribbon Campaign poster

The book cover of Ni Putes Ni Soumises.

Ni Putes Ni Soumises also carries out awareness-raising seminars in schools in order to encourage students to think about gender equality and break the cycle of sexism. In this way, the movement was able to reach out to 950 students in 2016.

The slogan used by the movement is meant both to shock and mobilise. Members particularly protest against changes of attitudes toward women, claiming there is an increased influence of Islamic extremism in those French suburbs with large immigrant populations. A particular concern is the treatment of Muslim women. Members claim that they may be pressured into wearing veils, leaving school, and marrying early. However, the movement represents women of all faiths and ethnic origins, all of whom may find themselves trapped by poverty and the ghettoisation of the cités.

A translation of the key points of NPNS's national appeal on its official website:

- No more moralising: our condition has worsened. The media and politics have done nothing, or very little, for us.
- No more wretchedness. We are fed up with people speaking for us, with being treated with contempt.
- No more justifications of our oppression in the name of the right to be different and of respect toward those who force us to bow our heads.
- No more silence in public debates about violence, poverty and discrimination.

== Early history ==
=== Samira Bellil and Sohanne Benziane ===
Two high-profile cases gave a particular impetus to NPNS during 2003. The first was that of Samira Bellil, who published a book called Dans l'enfer des tournantes ("In Gang Rape Hell"). In the culture of the banlieues, organised gang-rapes are referred to as tournantes, or "pass-arounds".

In her book, Bellil recounts her life as a girl under la loi des cités (the law of the ghetto) where she was gang raped on more than one occasion, the first time at age 13, afraid to speak out, and ultimately seen only as a sexual object, alienated and shunned by her family and some of her friends.

The second case was that of 17-year-old Sohanne Benziane, who was burned alive by an alleged small-time gang leader.

=== Protest marches ===
In the wake of these events, members of Ni Putes Ni Soumises staged a march through France, which started in February 2003 and passed through over 20 cities before culminating in a 30,000-strong demonstration in Paris on 8 March 2003. The march was officially called la Marche des femmes des quartiers contre les ghettos et pour l'égalité (The March of Women from the public housing against ghettoes and for equality).

Representatives of Ni Putes Ni Soumises were received by French Prime Minister Jean Pierre Raffarin. Their message was also incorporated into the official celebrations of Bastille Day 2003 in Paris, when 14 giant posters each of a modern woman dressed as Marianne, the symbol of the French Republic, were hung on the columns of the Palais Bourbon, the home of the Assemblée nationale (the lower house of the French parliament).

The following five propositions were accepted by the French government:

1. The publication of an educational guide dealing with respect, to be distributed in the housing projects and schools.
2. The establishment of safe houses away from the housing projects for girls and women in immediate distress, where they can be safe in relative anonymity.
3. The creation of six pilot sites where women will be able to have their voices heard.
4. The organisation of training seminars for women to develop their particular strengths.
5. Special provisions made in police stations for girls and women who have been the victims of violence.

=== Maison de la Mixité ===
The inauguration of the Maison de la Mixitié, the movement's premises in Paris' 20th arrondissement, took place in 2006. Then-President Jacques Chirac and then-future-President François Hollande both attended the event.

== Recent history ==
In November 2016 Ni Putes Ni Soumises elected a new leadership team, with Stéphanie Rameau, a long-serving member and activist in the movement, voted president.

In May 2017 Ni Putes Ni Soumises moved into its new premises at 80 rue de Paris in Montreuil, a largely working-class suburb of Paris.

== Criticisms ==
Ni Putes Ni Soumises has been criticized by various French feminists and left-wing authors (Sylvie Tissot, Houria Bouteldja, ), who claimed that it overshadowed the work of other feminist NGOs and that it supported an Islamophobic instrumentalization of feminism by the French Right.

Houria Bouteldja qualified Ni Putes ni Soumises as an Ideological State Apparatus (AIE). The debate among the French Left concerning the 2004 law on secularity and conspicuous religious symbols in schools, mainly targeted against the Hijab, is to be seen under this light. They underline that, first, sexism is not specific to immigrant populations, French culture itself not being devoid of sexism, and second, that the focus on mediatic and violent acts passes under silence the precarization of women.

Sylvie Tissot writes that Amara collaborated with the Cercle de l'Oratoire, and Mohammed Abdi, the current president of the NGO, is a member of this think-tank.

== See also ==
- Rape in France
- Islam in France

=== General ===
- Islam and domestic violence
- Women in Islam
- Madonna–whore complex – Mental complex revolving around negative views of female sexuality

== Bibliography ==
- BELLIL, Samira: Dans l'enfer des tournantes, Gallimard, 2003, ISBN 2-07-042990-3.
- AMARA, Fadela & ZAPPI, Sylvia: Ni putes ni soumises, La Découverte, 2003, ISBN 2-7071-4142-9. Review
- MURRAY, Brittany & PERPICH, Diane: Taking French Feminism to the Streets: Fadela Amara and the Rise of Ni Putes Ni Soumises, University of Illinois Press, 2011, ISBN 978-0-252-03548-7.
