= Farideh Mashini =

Iranian activist (1960–2012)

Farideh Mashini or Farideh Machini (Persian: فریده ماشینی; 1960 – 30 May 2012) was an Iranian researcher, Islamic feminist, women's rights activist, and reformist. Mashini was a member of the reformist party, Islamic Iran Participation Front, and the Women's rights movement in Iran. She also served as the secretary of the Women's Participation Front, and researcher at Iran's Women's Study Center. She died of cancer on 30 May 2012.

Mashini was a graduate of the Tehran Women's Studies program. She continued her academic work as a board member of the Institute for Women's Studies and Research, participant at national and international conferences, and article author.

Following Iran's disputed 2009 elections, Mashini was one of thirty activists arrested at a prayer ceremony in front of detained political activist Shahabeddin Tabatabai's house.

== Views ==
Farideh Mashini believed that “There is no contradiction to what is written in the Quran and the Convention on the Elimination of All Forms of Discrimination Against Women (CEDAW)” and said, "we should be an example to the world by ratifying the CEDAW and promoting the future of our women.”

== See also ==
- List of Muslim feminists
