= Shamima Shaikh =

South African feminist (1960–1998)

- Born: September 14, 1960; Louis Trichardt, Transvaal; South Africa
- Died: January 8, 1998 (aged 37); Johannesburg, Gauteng; South Africa
- Education: University of Durban-Westville
- Occupations: Women's rights activist, journalist
- Spouse: Na'eem Jeenah (m. 1987)
- Children: Minhaj, Shir'a

Shamima Shaikh (14 September 1960 – 8 January 1998) was a South African Muslim women's rights activist, notable Islamic feminist, and journalist.

== Biography ==
She was born in Louis Trichardt, Transvaal (today South Africa's Limpopo Province). She was the second of six children born to Salahuddin and Mariam Shaikh. Her first school years were in Louis Trichardt, until the family moved to Pietersburg, just over 100 km South.

After completing school in 1978, Shaikh studied at the University of Durban-Westville, which was reserved, under South Africa's apartheid laws, for students of Indian descent. In 1984 she completed her Bachelor of Arts Degree, majoring in Arabic and Psychology. These were politically charged years at university, and she got involved in the Azanian People's Organisation (AZAPO) for the next two years.

In 1985 Shaikh was elected to the executive committee of the Islamic Society of UD-W. On 4 September 1985, she was arrested for distributing pamphlets that called for a consumer boycott of white-owned businesses in Durban. The boycott had been called by the Federation of South African Trade Unions (Fosatu), the largest trade union federation in the country and supported by the Muslim Students Association of South Africa (MSA), which had organised this particular pamphlet blitz. Shaikh spent the next few hours locked up at Durban's CR Swart Police Station (now Durban Central Police Station) with the president of the MSA, Na'eem Jeenah.. This was their first meeting and they would marry 2 years later.

After completing her degree in 1985, Shaikh taught at the Taxila Primary and Secondary school in her hometown of Pietersburg (now called Polokwane). She married Jeenah on 20 December 1987 and moved to Johannesburg. She gave birth to Minhaj in September 1988 and to Shir'a in 1990.

== Work ==
In 1989 Shaikh became involved with a Muslim community newspaper, al-Qalam, which was being edited by her husband. She also became increasingly involved in the Muslim Youth Movement of South Africa (MYM).

Together with her fellow activists in the MYM, Shaikh was visible in 1989 and 1990 in the heightened political activity in Durban with campaigns against the Tricameral Parliament elections for the "Indian" and "Coloured" race groups; the defiance campaign of the Mass Democratic Movement; marches; demonstrations; mass rallies and solidarity campaigns.

In 1993, Shaikh was elected the Transvaal Regional Chairperson of the Muslim Youth Movement, and was thus a member of its National Executive, only the second woman to hold such a position.

That was also the year that catapulted Shaikh into the limelight with her famous "women in the mosque" campaign. That Ramadan, Shaikh and a number of other women linked to the MYM began to mobilise women to attend the tarawih prayers at the 23rd Street Mosque in Fietas in Johannesburg. This led to clashes between her and some of the members of the mosque committee and thrust her into the public eye.

Later that year, she became the first national co-ordinator of the Muslim Youth Movement Gender Desk, a position that again put her on the MYM's National Executive. She held the position until she resigned in the middle of 1996. Under Shaikh's leadership, the MYM Gender Desk rapidly became the most outspoken Muslim organisation on the question of Muslim women's rights and gender within the Muslim community and the leading organisation in the South African articulation of Islamic feminism.

In her position as gender desk co-ordinator, Shaikh organised various workshops, seminars and campaigns. She spearheaded the MYM's "Campaign for a Just Muslim Personal Law", the "Equal Access to Mosques" campaign and various others.

Shaikh was very involved in the Muslim Forum on Elections – a coalition of Muslim organisations that was calling on the community to vote in South Africa's first democratic elections in April 1994, and to vote for those parties "that had formerly been part of the liberation movement" – in particular, the African National Congress (ANC) and the Pan Africanist Congress (PAC).

Also in 1994, Shaikh helped found and became the first chairperson of the Muslim Community Broadcasting Trust which applied for and was awarded a community radio licence for Johannesburg. She remained chair of the MCBT till her death.

She was also involved, from 1994, with the founding and establishment of the Muslim Personal Law Board of South Africa and was a member of the Board until it was unilaterally shut down by the United Ulama Council of South Africa.

That was also the year that she was diagnosed with breast cancer. As a result, she had to undergo a lumpectomy and radiation therapy. A year later, doctors found that the cancer had affected her entire skeleton. For this she was treated with high dose chemotherapy. After the cancer had thus disappeared, she had decided not to receive chemotherapy again, if the cancer recurred. She said she preferred to die with dignity and continue doing till the end what she loved rather than being sick in hospital.

That same year, while battling cancer, she was appointed Managing Editor of Al-Qalam. Under her editorship, Al-Qalam became the flagship of a progressive expression of Islam in South Africa.

In April 1997, Shaikh performed the hajj for the first time. After her return she and her husband began working on a manuscript about their hajj experiences. The result is "Journey of Discovery: A South African Hajj", published in 2000. In August 1997, the Muslim community radio station, The Voice, was launched - with Shaikh at its head.

On 22 December 1997, Shaikh completed her final public engagement. She delivered a paper, "Women & Islam – The Gender Struggle in South Africa: The Ideological Struggle" at the 21st Islamic Tarbiyyah Programme of the Muslim Youth Movement, at the As Salaam Educational Institute on South Africa's KwaZulu-Natal South Coast. Seventeen days later, on 8 January 1998 / 9 Ramadan 1418, Shaikh died.

== Death ==
In 1996, Shaikh suffered a relapse of cancer and died on 8 January 1998, at her home in Mayfair. One of the four funeral prayers performed for her was led by her close female friend, Farhana Ismail, with women and men following - as per Shaikh's request. Further, her funeral services at a Johannesburg Mosque and at the Claremont Main Road Mosque in Cape Town as well as the burial were attended by many women. In Pietersburg, dozens of women were present at her burial. She is survived by her husband and 2 children.

== See also ==
- Women as imams
- Islamic feminism
