= Mariam Alhassan Alolo =

Islamic preacher (born 1957)

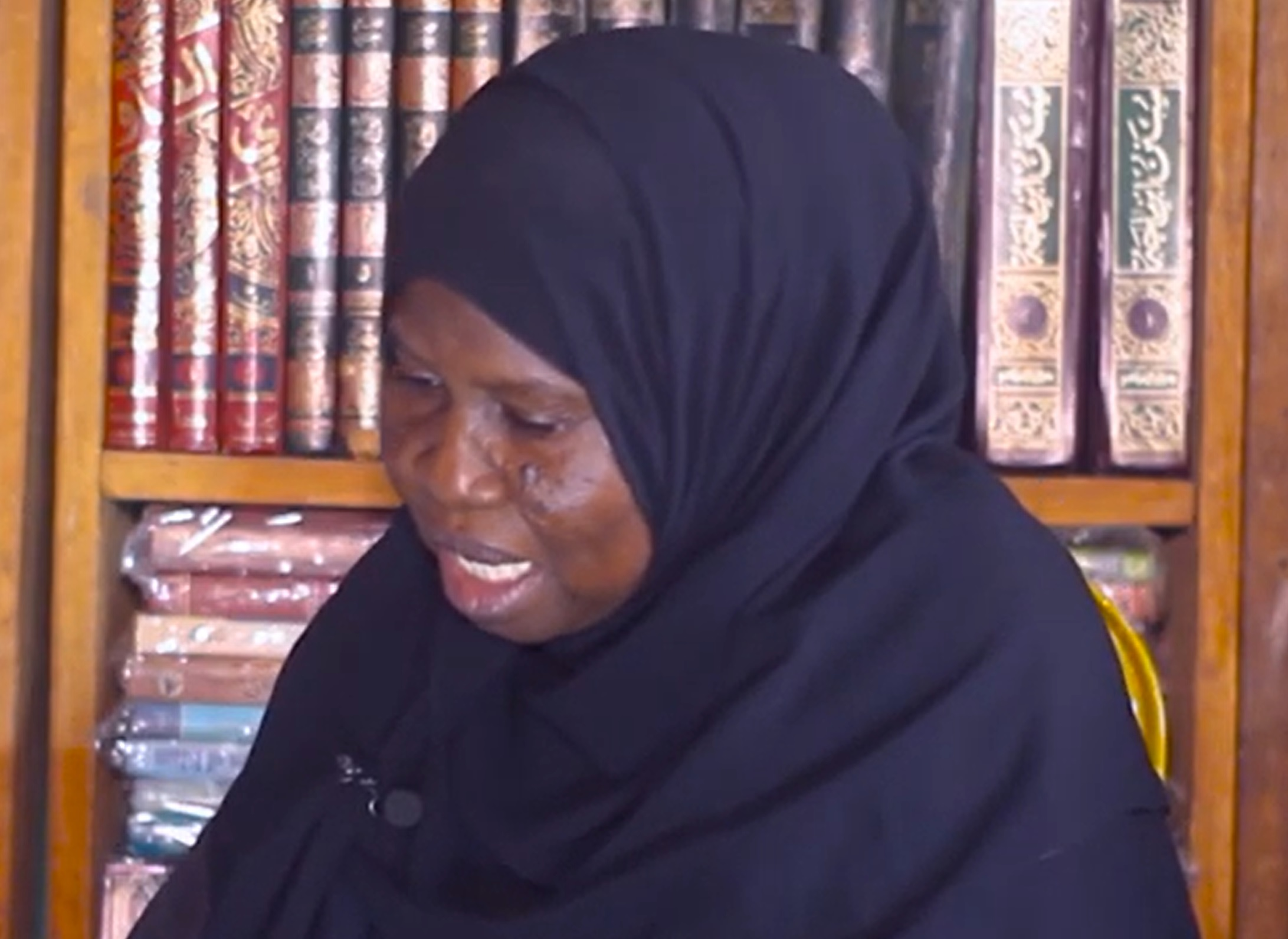

Personal life
- Born: 1 January 1957 (age 69) Tamale, Ghana

Religious life
- Religion: Islam

Hajia Mariam Alhassan Alolo commonly known as "Haji Mariam" is a business woman and an Islamic missionary born in Changli, a suburban area of Tamale, Ghana in 1957. She established the Mariam Islamic Center in Sabonjida in 1981 to train women preachers.

== Awards ==
Haji Mariam was a recipient of the Nana Asma'u Bint Fodio's Award for Excellence in Promotion of Literacy granted to her in 2008 by the Al furqaan Foundation, an excellence awards organization that honours Muslim individuals and organizations in Ghana.

A documentary by Mohammed Rafi focuses on her, as the first woman Islamic preacher in Ghana, and also of her daughter.
