= Na'eem Jeenah =

South African journalist

Na'eem Jeenah is a South African academic, activist and community leader.

== Biography ==
Na'eem Jeenah is currently a Senior Researcher at the Mapungubwe Institute for Strategic Reflection, and was previously the Executive Director of the Afro-Middle East Centre, a research institute dedicated to studying the Middle East and North Africa and relations between that region and the rest of Africa. He also worked as Director: Operations for the Freedom of Expression Institute in Johannesburg, South Africa, was a lecturer in Political Studies at the University of the Witwatersrand in Johannesburg.

Jeenah was born in the South African coastal city of Durban. He became involved with political activity in the 1980s when, while he was still in secondary school, the country erupted into almost a decade of nationwide student protests, followed by widespread resistance in trade unions and communities.

After school, Jeenah entered the highly politicized University of Natal Black Section, the medical school (only for black students) that was attached to the University of Natal, which was for White students only. Through his activities with the Muslim Students Association of South Africa and the Muslim Youth Movement of South Africa, he was thrust into the political limelight as these organizations became increasingly involved in the anti-Apartheid struggle.

After spending two years at the medical school and a year at the University of Durban-Westville, Jeenah dropped out of university and studied computer programming. He later married Shamima Shaikh, who he met for the first time when the couple was arrested during a trade union-led consumer boycott campaign against White businesses. Shaikh became one of South Africa's most well-known Islamic feminists. She died in January 1998, leaving Jeenah with two sons.

Jeenah rose in the ranks of the Muslim Youth Movement of South Africa to become its national general secretary and, later, its president. He was also, for a period, the editor of the Movement's mouthpiece newspaper, Al-Qalam. He steered the movement in a way that increased its political activism during the anti-apartheid struggle and, with Shaikh and others, founded the Muslim Youth Movement Gender Desk, the foremost organization promoting Muslim women's rights in South Africa at the time. It was also during the 1980s that Jeenah helped his organization and the Muslim community in South Africa to get involved in inter-faith activities - particularly through the South African chapter of the World Conference on Religion and Peace. Working with the latter, he was also a member of the drafting committee of a landmark document produced during South Africa's constitution-drafting period called the Declaration on Religious Rights and Responsibilities.

His other employment included: the Congress of South African Trade Unions; the Southern African NGO Network (SANGONet); the University of the Witwatersrand; and the Freedom of Expression Institute.

In 1994, on the eve of South Africa's first democratic elections, Jeenah's family joined others in South Africa who had sacrificed family members for the struggle: his brother, Mohseen Jeenah, a student leader and anti-Apartheid activist, was gunned down in the early hours of the morning of 17 January by Apartheid police.

Jeenah and Shaikh undertook the hajj pilgrimage in 1997, while Shaikh was already suffering from the effects of breast cancer, which had affected her severely. On the couple's return, they authored a book about their pilgrimage called Journey of Discovery: A South African Hajj. Soon after, they founded the Johannesburg-based Muslim community radio station called The Voice, which exposed radical and progressive Muslim voices to the Muslim community and became a flagship for women's rights, inter-religious tolerance and anti-imperialist rhetoric. It also gave a voice to refugee communities and social movements. Shaikh died just four months after the station went on air.

Jeenah's career has been a checkered one, spanning the NGO sector, academia, religious organizations and journalism. Currently working as a senior researcher with the think tank Mapungubwe Institute for Strategic Reflection, he was also executive director of the Afro-Middle East Centre, a board member of the Denis Hurley Peace Institute, and advisory board member of the Centre for Africa-China Studies, and an advisory board member of the World Congress for Middle Eastern Studies. He previously held the position of Director: Operations at the Freedom of Expression Institute, was a steering committee member of an inter-religious organization focusing on women's issues called The Other Voices, and a lecturer in political studies at the University of the Witwatersrand.

He is often interviewed as an expert by various media on issues related to South African politics - especially foreign policy, the Middle East, Islam and the Muslim world, Muslims in South Africa, Islamic Feminisms, political Islam, freedom of expression and various other issues. An experienced journalist, he also wrote for a number of publications and reported for a network of radio stations in the US. He was also a monthly columnist for the South African newspaper Al-Qalam.

Jeenah was named in December 2000 on the Mail & Guardian’s "Hot Shit 100 List" of people "Making their mark in the new millennium" and, in 2006, he was included on that newspaper's "100 young people you must take out to lunch".

== Publications ==
=== Books ===
- Jeenah, Na'eem; Shaik, Shamima (2000). "Journey of discovery: A South African Hajj". Cape Town: Full Moon Press.
- Jeenah, Na'eem (2005). "Religion and schools". Wits University Education Policy Unit. (Booklet)
- Jeenah, Na'eem; Saleh, Mohsen (2012). "The PLO: Critical appraisals from within". Johannesburg: Afro-Middle East Centre.
- Jeenah, Na'eem (2014). "Pretending democracy: Israel, an ethnocratic state". Johannesburg: Afro-Middle East Centre.

=== Some journal articles and chapters ===
- Jeenah, Na'eem (1996), "Pagad: Aluta Continua", in Galant, R.; Gamieldien, F. (eds.), Drugs, gangs, people's power: Exploring the Pagad phenomenon, Cape Town: Claremont Main Road Masjid.
- Jeenah, Na'eem (1996). "Pagad: Fighting fire with fire". Impact International. 26 (9).
- Jeenah, Na'eem (2001). "Whose enduring freedoms?: An analysis of Muslim responses to September 11 and the war against Afghanistan". Annual Review of Islam in South Africa. 4: 52–54. Pdf.
- Jeenah, Na'eem (2001). "2001 – A new form of Palestinian solidarity in South Africa". Annual Review of Islam in South Africa. 4: 31–34. Pdf.
- Jeenah, Na'eem (2001). "Towards an Islamic feminist hermeneutic". Journal for Islamic Studies. 21: 36–70. doi:10.4314/jis.v21i1.39954.
- Jeenah, Na'eem (2002). "Apartheid Israel?". Annual Review of Islam in Africa. 5: 31–35. Pdf.
- Jeenah, Na'eem (2003). "South Africa's anti-war movements: Towards an assessment". Debate: Voices from the South African Left: 10–12.
- Jeenah, Na'eem (2004). "Apartheid Israel continued". Alternatives. 2 (8): 19.
- Jeenah, Na'eem (September–October 2004). "Bilqis – A Qur'anic model for leadership and for Islamic feminists". Journal of Semitic Studies (Pretoria). 13 (1): 47–58.
- Jeenah, Na'eem (September–October 2004). "Seeing through tears in Rwanda". Fellowship. 70 (9–10): 25–26.
- Jeenah, Na'eem (2005). "Hajj: Only at this sacred time and place". ISIM Review. 16: 50–51.
- Jeenah, Na'eem (2005). "Review: Symbolic Confrontations: Muslims Imagining the State in Africa by Donal B. Cruise O'Brien". Journal of Contemporary African Studies. 23 (3): 434–437. doi:10.1080/02589000500274084. S2CID 216142284.
- Jeenah, Na'eem (January–February 2006). "The national liberation struggle and Islamic feminisms in South Africa". Women's Studies International Forum. 29 (1): 27–41. doi:10.1016/j.wsif.2005.10.004.

== See also ==
- Shamima Shaikh
