= Hidaya Sultan al-Salem =

- هدايه سلطان السالم
- Born: 1936; Shuwaikh Port, Kuwait
- Died: March 20, 2001 (aged 64–65); Kuwait City, Kuwait
- Education: Mutawia Saleema & Mutawia Mariam Al Askar
- Occupations: Journalist, editor-in-chief, and publisher
- Years active: 1961-2001
- Employer: Al-Majeles magazine
- Known for: Publisher of Al-Majeles
- Notable work: Women in Koran & The Arab
- Children: Four sons, including Nawwaf al-Othman, and one daughter

Hidaya Sultan al-Salem, (Arabic: هدايه سلطان السالم, 1936 – 20 March 2001), sometimes transliterated as Hedaya, was a Kuwaiti journalist and author, who owned and edited one of Kuwait's earliest political magazines al-Majalis in Kuwait City, Kuwait. She was Kuwait's first female to serve as an editor of a publication. She was a feminist and secularist, and she campaigned against corruption and on behalf of women's rights and suffrage in Kuwait. She was the first journalist to be killed in Kuwait since the Committee to Protect Journalists began recording these acts in 1992.

== Personal ==
Hidaya Sultan al-Salem was born in Shuwaikh, Kuwait, to the ruling family. As a child, she attended the private Koranic girls' school of Mutawia Saleema and the Mutawia Mariam Al Askar until 1946. Her education came to an end when she was married at the age of fifteen. At the time of her husbands' death, she was a widow and a mother of four sons and one daughter.

== Career ==
Hidaya Sultan al-Salem was a journalist and author, editor and publisher for 40 years. However, she began her career as a teacher. She was the sixth woman to ever become a teacher in Kuwait. While she was a teacher, she started writing articles for Lebanese and Egyptian newspapers.

In 1961, she became a journalist in Kuwait. In 1964, she was a founding member of the Kuwaiti Literary League. She published five non-fiction books while working as a journalist. Two of the books were The Arabs (1965) and Women in Koran. In 1970, al-Salem bought the weekly magazine al-Majalis and became its publisher and editor-in-chief. She was also the owner of Arab Sport. In 1972, she became part of a second wave of Kuwaiti women writers when she published a short story "Kharif bila matar" (Translated: "An Autumn Without Rain"). In addition, she published an underground newsletter Children And Women of Kuwait during the occupation of Kuwait by Iraq in 1990–1991.

She was also a member of the Kuwaiti Journalists Association and served on its board as a prominent woman.

== Death ==
Mentioned locations within Kuwait relative to the capital Kuwait City.

She was shot and killed in Kuwait City on 20 March 2001 while she was being driven to a Women and Culture Conference that was being hosted by the Kuwaiti Women's Association. The conference was being held to declare Kuwait City as the "capital of Arab culture" for a year. On the way, al-Salem was stopped at a traffic stop when Lieutenant Colonel Khaled Niga al-Azmi got out of his four-wheel drive vehicle and shot six bullets into al-Salem's head. This was an act of revenge against al-Salem for publishing an article which made a mention on how women from the Awazim tribe were hired as dancers in the first half of the 20th century in Kuwait. The Lt. Colonel was a high ranking police officer, and he was wearing a long traditional robe at the time of the shooting.

== Investigation ==
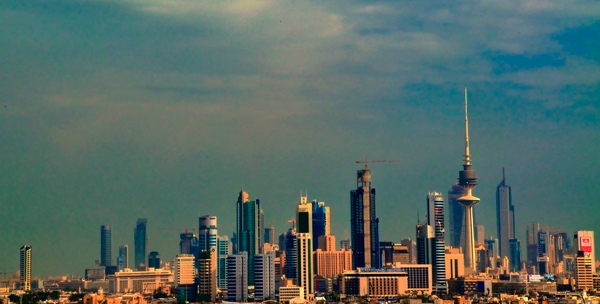
Hidaya Sultan al-Salem lived and worked in Kuwait City, Kuwait.

Originally four people were investigated for the murder of Hidaya. Many motives for the murder were reviewed. At the beginning of the investigation, some believed the murder was political. Hidaya had written an article about money being embezzled, and the office in the Gulf Emirate not being used appropriately. Her lawyer believed it was too early to assume Hidaya was killed for political reasons. Another motive included financial problems and disputes with her employees. The investigation led to the actual motive for the crime. A year before the murder al-Salem had published an article, the article had criticized his Al-Awazem tribe. In the article al-Salem had published her thoughts about women dancers in the tribe. The dancers were women that al-Salem's family had hired. The article described the women dancers as 'all temptation and sexual suggestion'. Many members of the tribe took offense to this, due to the fact that al-Salem had talked about the tribe living outside the Kuwait walls. The members of the tribe believed al-Salem was implying that they were not real Kuwaiti people. Later, al-Salem explained that she did not mean that. The Lt. Colonel was thought to have killed al-Salem to protect the honor of his tribe.

At first, the Lt. Colonel claimed innocence but later admitted that he was infuriated by the criticism of his tribe in her magazine. Later, the Lt. Colonel recanted his confession and suggested the police had forced the confession. In February 2002, Lt. Colonel Khaled al-Azmi was convicted by a criminal court for the murder of Hidaya Sultan al-Salem and sentenced to death by hanging, which was upheld on appeal. However, the sentence was later commuted to life by Kuwait's court of cassation.

== Context ==
Even though the Constitution of Kuwait guaranteed women equality in 1961, women were not granted rights until 1999, which was opposed by the reactionary tribal-fundamentalist alliance.

Hidaya Sultan al-Salem was a campaigner for women's rights and suffrage in Kuwait, as well as a female leader in publishing. Women media professionals surveyed by the Beirut-based Institute for Women's Studies in the Arab World concurred that important editorial decisions in all media were still invariably made by men. While women were occupying more spots in journalism training programs, they were employed at the same level.

She also played a role in the emergence of women in the literary scene in Kuwait in an era when magazine publishing was a new development.

== Impact ==
While Hidaya Sultan al-Salem was the first journalist killed in Kuwait, she was one of 51 journalists killed while on the job in 2001. The rate of professionals in the media being attacked and killed increased during the year of 2001.

== Reactions ==
Hidaya Sultan al-Salem wrote articles primarily about corruption in Kuwait. Kuwait News Agency reported 80 percent of her more recent articles before her murder was about corruption.

The fundamentalist tribe alliance banned the publication of books written by two of her peers Aalia Shuaib and Laila al-Uthman.

== See also ==
- Human rights in Kuwait
- Kuwaiti women
