= "Believing Women" in Islam =

2002 book by Asma Barlas

"Believing Women" in Islam: Unreading Patriarchal Interpretations of the Qur'an
- Author: Asma Barlas
- Publisher: University of Texas Press
- Pages: 352
- ISBN: 9781477315927
- Website: https://utpress.utexas.edu/9781477315927/believing-women-in-islam/

"Believing Women" in Islam: Unreading Patriarchal Interpretations of the Qur'an is a 2002 book by Asma Barlas, published by the University of Texas Press. According to Barlas, the Qur'an does not support patriarchy and modern day Muslims were not properly interpreting the text. She argues that the Qur'an supports equal spousal and marital rights and does not differentiate among sex and gender. Barlas attributes incorrect interpretations of the Qur'an to the hadith, shariah, and sunnah. Barlas stated that men were mostly the ones who had developed shariah.

== Background ==
As of 2002, Barlas was the head of the Ithaca College Department of Politics, and the interim director of the college's Center for the Study of Culture, Race, and Ethnicity. She is a Muslim and believes the Qur'an is of divine origin.

== Content ==
Kristin Zahra Sands of the New York University Department of Middle Eastern Studies described the book as a Quranic exigesis rather than being an eternal study of exigesis. Barlas criticizes the traditional use of the hadith (sayings of Muhammed, not in the Quran) and tafsir (interpretation of the Quran), texts she sees as important to the misogynistic customs and beliefs in contemporary Islam, in Part I; these texts are often used together with the Qur'an in Islam. She advocates using ijtihad (informed independent thought). The author has criticized some English translations of the Qur'an, and she argued that the document may be explored in any language.

The main references used for the portions regarding the traditions of the Quran and tafsir are secondary sources and English translations.

Sands described "Believing Women" as "Building particularly on the work of Fazlur Rahman and Farid Esack".

== Reception ==
Sands argued that the book is "an interesting contribution to contemporary Muslim thought that will be useful in teaching a broad range of undergraduate and graduate courses." Sands stated that due to the book's use of Islamic and feminist terminology, it would be best used "selectively" in introductory classes. Sands argued that the book should have been "engaging more fully with the Arabic interpretative tradition" and that the book should not criticize a translation if it accurately reflects the original Arabic.

Jane I. Smith of the Hartford Seminary stated that the book was "a well-constructed and thoughtfully written work, the arguments clearly developed and the prose a pleasure to read."

Carolyn M. Craft of Longwood University wrote that the book is important for larger public libraries and academic libraries, and that it complements Qur'an and Woman: Rereading the Sacred Text from a Woman's Perspective by Amina Wadud.
