= Killing of Sohane Benziane =

2002 criminal case in France

Sohane Benziane (1984 – October 4, 2002) was a French girl of Algerian ancestry who was killed at the age of 17.

On October 4, 2002 in Vitry-sur-Seine, Val-de-Marne, Île-de-France, 17-year-old Sohane Benziane was burned alive in front of her friends in a cellar by her former boyfriend, a local caid (gang leader). While a watch was kept outside, the killer, nicknamed Nono, who had bought the bottle of gasoline a day before, poured gasoline over Sohane and set her on fire with a lighter.

As Sohane, engulfed in flames, managed to run out screaming in agony, her death was witnessed by a dozen other students that were coming out of class.

The incident captured the attention of the French and international press and sparked outrage throughout France. It led to the founding of the feminist rights movement Ni Putes Ni Soumises.

Despite trial testimony that Sohane's death was intended by the accused, a local Maghrebi gang leader, Jamal Derrar, was convicted of torture and barbarity leading to unintentional death. A second defendant, Tony Rocca, was sentenced to eight years for barring the door of the depot as Sohane screamed for help.

A commemorative plaque in her memory was later desecrated. On 4 October 2005 a platform was inaugurated in her memory, in the presence of her sister Kahina Benziane.

== See also ==
- Ni Putes Ni Soumises
- Samira Bellil

== Additional sources ==
- Liberation article on Sohane in French
- L'humanite: Article on Sohane in her sister's words in French
- Time Europe: Acting on the outrage
- Time Magazine: Sisters In Hell
- CNN Transcript: Muslim Women Rebel In France
- Book review: Review of Ni Putes ni Soumises (Neither Whores nor Submissive) by Fadela Amara, which discusses the case
- Vanity Fair: Daughters of France, Daughters of Allah
- Newsweek: Sexism in the cites
- BBC News: French man jailed in torture case
