= Sineb El Masrar =

Moroccan-German journalist

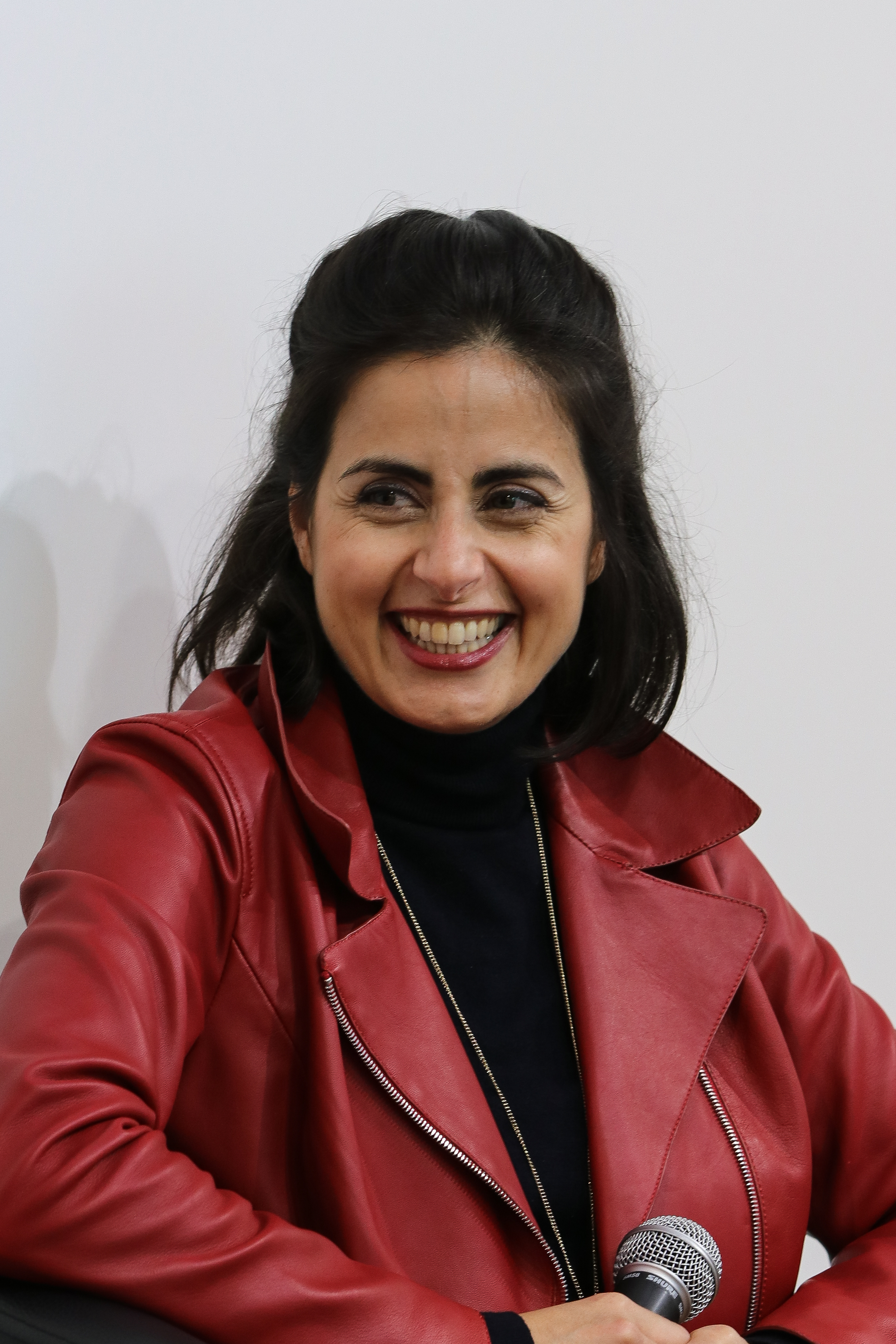
- Sineb El Masrar in 2018
- Born: 1981 (age 44–45) Hanover, Germany
- Language: German
- Subject: Islamic feminism
- Notable works: Muslim-Girls: Wer Wir Sind, Wie Wir Leben; Emanzipation im Islam

Sineb El Masrar (Arabic: سينب المسرار; born 1981) is a Moroccan-German author, journalist, and Islamic feminist.

She is the founder of the intercultural women's magazine Gazelle and has published several works dealing with the issue of feminism in Islam.

== Early life ==
Sineb El Masrar was born in 1981 in Hanover, Germany, and grew up there. Her father was a Moroccan car mechanic who left Tangier for Germany in the mid-1960s, and her mother joined him there in the late 1970s.

She first studied business, then graduated with a degree in education. She experienced discrimination during her job search, as the Catholic schools refused to hire a Muslim.

== Career ==
In June 2006, El Masrar founded Gazelle, a multicultural women's magazine, which she runs as editor in chief. She was inspired by a lack of magazines for women and girls with a migrant background.

She became involved in German government projects on integration, serving as a member of the "Media and Integration" working group as part of a conference organized by Minister of State for Migration, Refugees, and Integration Maria Böhmer. From May 2010 to 2013, she also participated in the German Islam Conference, a German dialogue on Islam.

El Masrar's first book, Muslim Girls: Wer Wir Sind, Wie Wir Leben ("Muslim Girls: Who We Are, How We Live"), was published in 2010. It was rereleased in a pocket format in 2015.

Her next book, Emanzipation im Islam ("Emancipation in Islam"), made headlines when it was published in early 2016. It was the subject of a complaint from the Islamist movement Millî Görüş, which compelled El Masrar to withdraw a passage from the book via a ruling of the Munich district court.

In 2018, she published Muslim Men: Wer Sie Sind, Was Sie Wollen ("Muslim Men: Who They Are, What They Want"), in which she discusses prejudice against Muslim men.

Her next two books addressed German society. Sind wir nicht alle ein bisschen Alman? ("Aren't We All a Little Bit German?"), published in 2023, deals with identity and integration. Heult leise, Habibis ("Weep Quietly, My Darlings," 2024), discusses Islam's place in Germany and the balance of voices necessary to support democracy.

El Masrar lives in Berlin.

== Political positions ==
El Masrar calls for an open and critical interpretation of Islam, and she believes that Islam is not incompatible with women's rights. She emphasizes that Islam as a whole should not be confused with Salafism and points to the existence of female imams and an openly gay imam, Ludovic-Mohamed Zahed, in Marseille, France.

She is a supporter of Israel, supporting Israel's 2024 war on Gaza denying that there is a famine in Gaza, claiming that Palestinian journalists reporting genocide are Hamas operatives in disguise and stating "The Palestinian issue has been instrumentalised to destabilise Western democracies".

== Selected works ==
- Muslim Girls: Wer Wir Sind, Wie Wir Leben (2010)
- Emanzipation im Islam (2016)
- Muslim Men: Wer Sie Sind, Was Sie Wollen (2018)
- Sind wir nicht alle ein bisschen Alman? (2023)
- Heult leise, Habibis (2024)
