= Asma Barlas =

Pakistani-American writer and academic

- Born: 10 March 1950 (age 76); Lahore, Pakistan
- Education: Kinnaird College (B.A.); University of the Punjab (M.A.); University of Denver (M.A.; Ph.D.)
- Writing career
- Years active: 1976–present
- Notable work: "Believing Women" in Islam: Unreading Patriarchal Interpretations of the Qur'an

Asma Barlas (born 10 March 1950) is a Pakistani-American writer and academic. Her specialties include comparative and international politics, Islam and Qur'anic hermeneutics, and women's studies.

== Early life and education ==
Barlas was born in Pakistan in 1950. She earned a Bachelor of Arts in English literature and philosophy from Kinnaird College and a master's degree in journalism from the University of the Punjab. She also holds a master's degree and Ph.D. in international studies from the University of Denver.

== Career ==
Barlas was one of the first women to be inducted into the foreign service in 1976. Six years later, she was dismissed on the orders of General Zia ul Haq. She worked briefly as assistant editor of the opposition newspaper The Muslim before receiving political asylum in the United States in 1983.

Barlas joined the politics department of Ithaca College in 1991. She was the founding director of the Center for the Study of Culture, Race, and Ethnicity for 12 years. She held Spinoza Chair in Philosophy at the University of Amsterdam in 2008.

== Research ==
Barlas has focused on the way Muslims produce religious knowledge, especially patriarchal exegesis of the Qur'an, a topic she has explored in her book, "Believing Women" in Islam: Unreading Patriarchal Interpretations of the Qur'an.

She rejects the designation of her views and interpretations of Islam as "Islamic feminism," unless that term is defined as "a discourse of gender equality and social justice that derives its understanding and mandate from the Qur'an and seeks the practice of rights and justice for all human beings in the totality of their existence across the public-private continuum."

In her first book, Democracy, Nationalism and Communalism: The Colonial Legacy in South Asia, Barlas explored the relationship of militarism in Pakistani politics to British colonialism.

== Works ==
=== Books ===
- Islam, Muslims, and the US: Essays on Religion and Politics (India, Global Media Publications, 2004)
- "Believing Women" in Islam: Unreading Patriarchal Interpretations of the Qur'an (University of Texas Press, 2002).
- Democracy, Nationalism, and Communalism: The Colonial Legacy in South Asia (Westview Press, 1995)
- Confronting Qur'anic Patriarchy (University of Texas Press, 2018) (forthcoming) (co-written with Raeburn Finn) ??
- "Believing Women" in Islam: Unreading Patriarchal Interpretations of the Qur'an (Revised edition. University of Texas Press, February 2019)

=== Essays ===
- "Reviving Islamic Universalism: East/s, West/s, and Coexistence," in Abdul Aziz Said and Meena Sharify-Funk (eds.), Contemporary Islam: Dynamic, Not Static (Routledge, 2006).
- "Women's and Feminist Readings of the Qur'an," in Jane Dammen McAuliffe (ed.), Cambridge Companion to the Qur'an (Cambridge University Press, 2006).
- "Globalizing Equality: Muslim Women, Theology, and Feminisms," in Fera Simone (ed.), On Shifting Ground: Muslim Women in the Global Era (NY: Feminist Press, 2005).
- "Amina Wadud's Hermeneutics of the Qur'an: Women Rereading Sacred Texts," in Suha Taji-Faruqi (ed.), Contemporary Muslim Intellectuals and the Quran: Modernist and Post Modernist Approaches (Oxford: Oxford University Press, 2004).

== See also ==
- Fatema Mernissi
- Ziba Mir-Hosseini
- Azizah Y. al-Hibri
- Amina Wadud
- Islamic feminism
