= Fadela Amara =

French feminist and politician (born 1964)

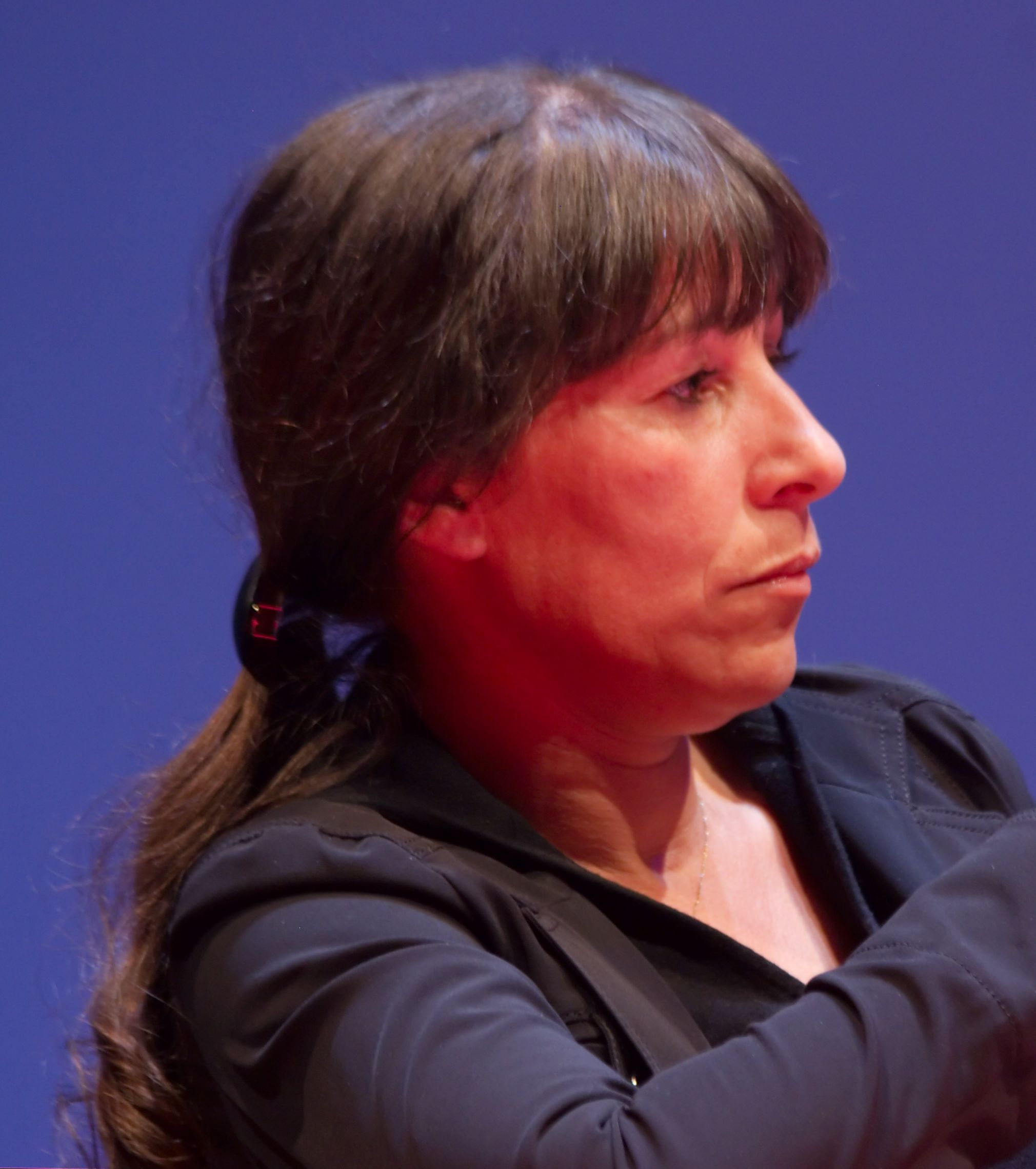
- At the 2008 Libération Forum in Grenoble
- Born: 25 April 1964 (age 62); Puy-de-Dôme

Fadela Amara (born Fatiha Amara on 25 April 1964) is a French feminist and politician, who began her political life as an advocate for women in the impoverished banlieues. She was the Secretary of State for Urban Policies in the liberal Union for a Popular Movement (UMP) government of French Prime Minister François Fillon. She is a former president of the organisation Ni Putes Ni Soumises.

== Biography ==
Amara was born to Algerian Berber Kabyle parents in an emergency housing district of Clermont-Ferrand, Puy-de-Dôme, which she later described as a shanty-town. The neighbourhood was mostly populated by immigrants from the Maghreb. She was born into a family of eleven children, having four sisters and six brothers. Her father worked as a labourer during the week and in the markets on the weekend, while her mother was a housewife. Despite not being well off, Amara's father sent money back to his home village in Algeria and kept some more aside for the poor of the district. Regarding the situation there for women she said, "daughters, sisters, cousins, female neighbours must either act like submissive but virtuous vassals, or be treated like cheap whores. Any sign of independence or femininity is viewed as a challenge and provocation." Although she wished to study literature, she ended up taking a qualification as an office employee.

In 1978, when Amara was 14, her brother Malik was run down by a drunk driver. He died of his injuries after a few hours. Amara was appalled to see the police side with the driver at the scene of the incident.

Amara participated in the first demonstration aimed at encouraging electoral registration among the young people of Clermont-Ferrand. When she was 16 years old, the municipal authorities decided to demolish the district she lived in. She went from door to door canvassing support for its retention. At the age of 18, she established the Association des femmes pour l'échange intercommunautaire (Women's Association for Intercommunal Exchange), a fledgling example of Islamic feminism, with the aim of developing women's autonomy and individual thought through meetings between neighbouring communities.

In 1983 she took part in a mass demonstration of the Beurs (French of North African origin), and from 1986 on she was an activist within the civil rights organisation SOS Racisme. In 2000 she was elected president of the Fédération nationale des maisons des potes (FNMP). In 1989 she established the Women's Commission, whose principal objective was to investigate the position of women in urban and suburban areas and register the demands of those communities.

In March 2001 she was elected on the Socialist Party list at the municipal council of Clermont-Ferrand.

After the 2002 murder of 17-year-old Sohanne Benziane, she organised a march from the murder site beneath a banner declaring the women Ni Putes, Ni Soumises (neither whores, nor submissives). The motto stuck and became the name of the resulting organisation, of which she became the president.

In 2002 she organised a "women's parliament" in the Sorbonne with over 250 participants, drew up a petition which gained almost 20,000 signatures, and organised a nationwide tour of Ni Putes Ni Soumises, which finished in Paris on 8 March 2003.

On 19 June 2007, although still a member and a municipal councillor of the Socialist Party, she was appointed Secretary of State for Urban Policies in the 2nd UMP government of French Prime Minister François Fillon. She reported to Housing Minister Christine Boutin. She left the government in 2010, and was named France's inspector general for social affairs in January 2011.

== Secularism ==
André Gerin, who headed the commission to study the burqa, stated in an interview with The Economist, "We will not accept that a particular religion: Islam or anything else, occupying the public space and dictating its rules over civil society. Thats what's happening with the fundamentalists...It goes against the entire history of Western Civilization." President Nicolas Sarkozy, proposing the burqa legislation, was the first president to address the assembly since Napoleon Bonaparte. Bonaparte is considered to be one of the 'fathers' of French secularism but also allied the state with the Catholic Church and signed the Concordat of 1801. Kaminski, a member of the WSJ editorial board, stated, "A state—a majority Christian state, to boot—is mandating how members of a minority religion should go about practising theirs."

The Guardian stated, "This battle came to a head during the furore surrounding France's controversial 2004 law banning headscarves in schools. Amara's position was clear:," quoting Amara as stating, "The veil is the visible symbol of the subjugation of women," the article goes on to conclude, "and therefore has no place in the mixed, secular spaces of France's public school system." The article and its conclusions were widely plagiarised by major news agencies but never verified for accuracy. The Atlantic claimed that Brian Grim had made exactly the same statements in a Pew Research Center report but he did not. It was plagiarized in a conference paper by a professor at the University of Pennsylvania. Chenut's Forward to Fadela Amara's book cites Françoise Gaspard's work on the subject, "Women's rights, she argues, are better served by not banning the headscarf. Expelling girls from French public schools deprives them of their right to education and of a path to modernity." On page 94, Amara explains her reasoning for her opposition to the headscarf in public schools, that emancipated educated French Muslim women had apparently made the wrong choice, blaming the public school system for not teaching them to make the right choice, "In the late 1980s...I was among those who said that these young women should not be excluded. Our reasoning was simple: these young women were under pressure from their families; to help them resolve it, it was preferable to keep them at school. We were counting on the republican school system, where they would learn to make their own choice and then to refuse the headscarf." She goes on to argue that any attempt to ban the headscarf will be met with violent opposition, "The effect will be the reverse of what we hoped for, the peaceful coexistence of different religions within a common secular framework." The Guardian's misinterpretation of her following statement is evident from the preceding quotations, "it is first of all a means of oppression, of alienation, of discrimination, an instrument of power over women used by men...We must tell young women that they can be Muslims today without wearing the headscarf." Amara's position was discussed in an English law school doctoral thesis with far greater attention to detail, confirming that Amara was against the ban.

In 2013 she gave a speech at the University of Chicago in which she stated that she was in favour of a complete ban on the burqa before 2004. The English translator did not possess dual proficiency and misinterpreted most technical concepts. Amara claimed that Islamic fundamentalists paid women to wear veils to make it seem like it was more normal. She claims a vast conspiracy of "Islamic fundamentalists", "trying to install islam everywhere, just like you've seen on the TV." She states that she respects women who choose to wear veils and that they should be allowed to wear them. She states that women should be free to choose to wear a veil. She states that she would prefer legislation that protects women who wear the veil and for them to choose not to wear it, describing her opponents as fascists. This position was criticised on a French lawyers blog where he cited already enacted laws which provide this desired protection: Articles 222-18 and Article 222–13, the author of the blog argues that the current laws are already effective but that the burqa ban would be inadequate to protect women from domestic violence. Amara, in the Chicago speech, criticised the Levy sisters, who wore hijab not burqa, for "flaunting" the French principle of secularism and blamed all instances of girls wearing veils to school on the sisters. Amara's position was very unclear as she both advocated for an act that strictly prohibited the practice under penalty of law and for women to maintain the freedom to choose.

In 2009, the day after the commission into the burqa was tabled in the National Assembly, Amara showed her support for the parliamentary commission to investigate the burqa

"I am in favour of a complete prohibition of the burqa throughout the country. I want it to be banned, this coffin of fundamental freedoms. I want a debate that leads to a law that protects women."

The commissioners interviewed 200 people but did not interview any women who wore full veils regularly. Only two of the women the commission heard testimony from wore veils, Saïda Kada and Fatiha Ajbli. The laws passed by the National Assembly were what Amara had warned about in her 2004 book. Instead of a complete ban, it was only banned in public further serving to marginalise women and it was probably illegal to make up those laws anyway.

== Bibliography ==
- Ni Putes Ni Soumises. (ISBN 2-7071-4458-4)
- Neither Whores Nor Doormats: Women's Rights and Human Rights in Contemporary France. (ISBN 0-520-24621-7, English translation)
