= Siti Musdah Mulia =

Indonesian women's rights activist

- Siti Musdah Mulia in 2016
- Born: 1958 (age 67–68); Bone Regency, South Sulawesi, Indonesia

Academic work
- Discipline: Religious studies
- Institutions: Syarif Hidayatullah State Islamic University Jakarta

Siti Musdah Mulia (born 1958) is an Indonesian women's rights activist and professor of religion. She was the first woman appointed as a research professor at the Indonesian Institute of Sciences, and is currently a lecturer of Islamic political thought at the School of Graduate Studies at Syarif Hidayatullah State Islamic University Jakarta. Since 2007, Musdah has served as chairperson of the NGO Indonesian Conference on Religion and Peace, which aims to promote interfaith dialogue in Indonesia. She also served as director of the Megawati Institute, a think-tank established by former president Megawati Soekarnoputri.

== Early life ==
Musdah was born in Bone, South Sulawesi, in 1958, to a conservative Muslim family. Her father was a local Islamic leader who served as a battalion leader in Darul Islam, while her mother was the first girl from her village to graduate from an Islamic school.

== Career ==
In 1997, Musdah became the first woman to receive a PhD in Islamic thought from Syarif Hidayatullah Islamic State University. From 1999 until 2007 she served as a senior advisor at the Ministry of Religious Affairs where she contributed to the 2004 legal draft challenging Indonesia's proposed Islamic legal code, recommending that it be amended to prohibit child marriage and polygamy, and allow interfaith marriage; due to violent protests, the redraft was ultimately dropped. From 2000 until 2005, she was head of the research division of the Council of Indonesian Ulema.

Musdah has also written books, including Islam Criticises Polygamy (2003), TheReformist Muslimah's Encyclopedia: Essence of Ideas for Reinterpretation and Action (2004), and Islam and the Inspiration of Gender Equality (2005). In 2020, she launched an updated edition of Reformist Muslimah.

Musdah has expressed moderate views on Islamic issues; she has stated there is no directive demanding women wear the hijab, and has expressed LGBT-friendly sentiments. Musdah also deemed polygamy to be haram. She also has expressed the view that Muslim women should be permitted to interpret Islamic teachings themselves and become ulama.

== Accolades ==
Musdah received the 2007 International Women of Courage Award from the United States government. In 2008, she received the Yap Thiam Hien Human Rights Award for her work on promoting dialogue and inclusiveness in Islam.
