= Samira Bellil =

French feminist activist for women's rights

Samira Bellil

Samira Bellil (24 November 1972 – 4 September 2004) was a French feminist activist and a campaigner for the rights of girls and women.

Bellil became famous in France with the publication of her autobiographical book Dans l'enfer des tournantes ('In the hell of the "tournantes" (gang-rapes) in 2002. The book discusses the violence she and other young women endured in the predominantly North African and Arab immigrant outskirts of Paris, where she was repeatedly gang-raped as a teenager by gangs led by people she knew, and then abandoned by her family and friends.

The book is available in English (translated by Lucy R. McNair) as To Hell and Back: The Life of Samira Bellil.

== Life ==
Bellil was born to Algerian parents in Algiers. Her family migrated to France and settled in the Parisian suburb of Val-d'Oise. Her father was jailed almost immediately for murder and she was fostered by a family in Belgium for five years, before being called back to her parents.

As a teenager Bellil rebelled against the traditional constraints of her community and wanted to live freely as a young French woman.

Samira was gang-raped when she was 14 by a gang led by someone she knew. They beat her and raped her all night. A month later, one of the most violent attackers dragged her off a train by her hair while other passengers looked the other way. She was brutally raped by him again.

She did not report her rapes until two friends told her the same gang had sexually assaulted them too. Samira appealed to the French legal system to prosecute her attackers. The ring leader was sentenced to eight years in prison.

Bellil's parents, who believed themselves shamed by her presence, expelled her from her house as she did not practice 'modesty' and chose not to veil herself with a hijab. "People outside the community don't know," Bellil wrote, "and everyone in the community knows, but they won't say anything."

Eventually, she found a psychologist who helped her. She had years of therapy, and describes how she decided to write her book to show other young women gang-rape victims that there was a way out. "It's long and it's difficult, but it's possible," she wrote in the dedication - to "my sisters in trouble". She used her real name and put her photo on the cover. She dedicated the book to her "girlfriends, so that they realize that one can overcome the traumatic" and to Boris Cyrulnik, her therapist. Her experience shocked France and forced the government to look into the issue.

She became a youth worker. She died aged 31 on 4 September 2004 of stomach cancer.

== Ni Putes Ni Soumises ==
Bellil helped found a young women's activist group called Ni Putes Ni Soumises ("Neither whores nor submissives") which has publicly addressed the issue of violence against young women in France. The group drew the attention of the French and European press as they organized marches and press conferences to bring attention to the tragic events happening to young women in the banlieue of France. She denounced the gang-rapes (known as tournantes, or "pass-arounds") and described how she overcame both her traumatic experiences and the need for revenge.

== Legacy ==
She was chosen as one of the new Mariannes, the new faces of France. Her portrait hangs outside the French National Assembly.

In 2005 a French school in l’Île-Saint-Denis was named in her honor: Ecole Samira Bellil.
