= Dans l'enfer des tournantes =

In the Hell of the Tournantes
- Cover to French paperback edition of Dans l'enfer des tournantes.
- Author: Samira Bellil
- Original title: Dans l'enfer des tournantes
- Language: French
- Genre: Non-fiction
- Publication date: October 9, 2002
- Media type: Print
- Pages: 307
- ISBN: 2-07-042990-3

Dans l'enfer des tournantes (In the Hell of the Tournantes) is a book by French activist Samira Bellil.

The book focuses on life in the banlieues, where Bellil says that she and countless other young girls have been victims of organized gang-rapes known as tournantes. Banlieue literally translates as "suburb", but in the context of modern France, refers to the poorer housing estates, often populated by immigrants and their children, that ring the big cities. The book was first published on October 9, 2002.
