= Lycée Henri Wallon =

Lycée Henri Wallon may refer to:

- Lycée Henri Wallon in Aubervilliers
- Lycée Henri Wallon in Valenciennes
