= French ban on face covering =

2010 French act of parliament

Law 2010-1192 of 11 October 2010

French Parliament
- Long title: Law 2010-1192 of 11 October 2010 prohibiting the concealment of the face in public spaces
- Territorial extent: France
- Passed by: National Assembly
- Passed: 13 July 2010
- Passed by: Senate
- Passed: 14 September 2010
- Signed by: Nicolas Sarkozy
- Signed: 11 October 2010
- Effective: 11 April 2011

Legislative history

Initiating chamber: National Assembly
- Bill citation: N° 2520
- Introduced by: Michèle Alliot-Marie, Minister of Justice
- Introduced: 19 May 2010
- Committee responsible: Law
- Passed: 13 July 2010
- Voting summary: 335 voted for; 1 voted against
- Committee report: N° 2648

Revising chamber: Senate
- Bill citation: N° 675
- Received from the National Assembly: 13 July 2010
- Committee responsible: Law
- Passed: 14 September 2010
- Voting summary: 246 voted for; 1 voted against
- Committee report: N° 699

Keywords
- Secularism in France

Text of statute as originally enacted
- Status: In force

The French ban on face covering (Note: French: LOI n° 2010-1192: Loi interdisant la dissimulation du visage dans l'espace public, "Law of 2010-1192: Act prohibiting concealment of the face in public space") is the result of an act of parliament passed in 2010 banning the wearing of face-covering headgear, including masks, helmets, balaclavas, niqābs and other veils covering the face, and full body costumes and zentais (skin-tight garments covering entire body) in public places, except under specified circumstances. This ban does not apply to the hijab, as it does not cover the face. The ban does apply to the burqa, a full-body covering. In April 2011, France became the first European country to impose a ban on full-face veils (among other face covering clothes) in public areas.

Public debate exacerbated concerns over immigration, nationalism, secularism, security, and sexuality. Arguments supporting this proposal include that face coverings prevent the clear identification of a person (which may be a security risk, or a social hindrance within a society which relies on facial recognition and expression in communication), that the alleged forcing of women to cover their faces is sexist, and that Muslims who continue this practice should be forced to assimilate into traditional French social norms. Arguments against include that the ban encroaches on individual freedoms, and that it discriminates against interpretations of Islam that require or encourage women to wear face coverings, that it takes away the choice of women to decide whether to dress according to a particular standard of modesty, and prevents anonymity in situations where it might be socially or personally desirable. Opponents accused President Nicolas Sarkozy of fostering Islamophobia and using the law for political gain. Some researchers posited that the ban "reduces the secondary educational attainment of Muslim girls and affects their trajectory in the labor market and family composition in the long run" as well as reducing the "social integration of Muslim women into French society".

As of 11 April 2011, it was illegal to wear a face-covering veil or other masks in public spaces. Veils, scarves, and other headwear that do not cover the face are unaffected by this law. The law imposes a fine of up to €150, and/or participation in citizenship education, for those who violate the law. The bill also penalises, with a fine of €30,000 and one year in prison, anyone who forces (by violence, threats, or abuse of power) another to wear face coverings; these penalties may be doubled if the victim is under the age of 18.

As a result of the law, the only exception to someone wearing a face-covering cloth in public will be if they are travelling in a private car or worshiping in a religious place. French police say that while there are five million Muslims in France, fewer than 2,000 are thought to fully cover their faces with a veil. The wearing of all conspicuous religious symbols in public schools was previously banned in 2004 by a different law, the French law on secularity and conspicuous religious symbols in public schools. This affected the wearing of Islamic veils and headscarves in schools, as well as turbans and other distinctive items of dress.

The law was challenged and taken to the European Court of Human Rights which upheld the French law on 1 July 2014, accepting the argument of the French government that the law was based on "a certain idea of living together". In October 2018, the United Nations Human Rights Committee found that France's ban disproportionately harmed the right of two women [plaintiffs] to manifest their religious beliefs, and could have the effects of "confining them to their homes, impeding their access to public services and marginalizing them."

Amid the COVID-19 pandemic, there was some controversy over whether the use of face masks in response was compatible with the ban on face coverings although it was clarified that it was, under the existing exceptions for health and safety.

== Background ==
Burqa bans in Europe as of 2025: National ban – country bans women from wearing full-face veils in public Local ban – cities or regions ban full-face veils Partial ban – government bans full-face veils in some locations

Initial instances of the French government's actions towards a full face covering ban can be traced back to the "Scarf Affair" of 1989. Under this law, hijabs were no longer allowed to be worn in French public schools. Permission was granted to school administrators to declare when this law was being violated by students. Lack of adherence to the bill led to the adaption of a nationwide and religiously consistent plan.

The Law of Secularity and Conspicuous Religious Symbols in Schools was passed in September 2004. This law stated all religious items could no longer be worn in public schools including but not limited to: kippahs, Catholic crosses, and Muslim religious attire. Despite covering all religions, the law seemed to unevenly target Muslim individuals.

The French Parliament began an initial inquiry on the issue shortly after President Nicolas Sarkozy stated in June 2009 that religious face veils were "not welcome" within France. Sarkozy had stated that the law is to protect women from being forced to cover their faces and to uphold France's secular values. A poll carried out by Pew Research Center leading up to the vote indicated that 80% of French voters supported the ban. It was estimated that about 2,000 women wore the head coverings to be banned by this bill.

In 2010, the Belgian lower house of parliament approved a bill to ban facial coverings, but this was not voted into law as the Belgian government fell before the Senate could vote on it. As of 2010, when the French law was being debated, partial bans were being discussed in the Netherlands and Spain; bans had been announced locally in Italy but later declared unconstitutional, leading to a national law being proposed; and public debate on the issue was starting in Austria, while Germany, the United Kingdom and Switzerland did not consider legislation, although in the UK, directives had been issued leaving the issue to the discretion of school directors and magistrates.

Fadela Amara, who had recently served as a junior minister in the French government and is a Muslim, had previously declared: "The veil is the visible symbol of the subjugation of women, and therefore has no place in the mixed, secular spaces of France's state school system."

These actions taken by the government stem from the long history of separation between Church and state experienced in France. Established in 1905, Laïcité, the French term for separation of church and state governs that no religion can influence government affairs and policies. Anastasia Comobiso writes regarding the topic, "The State abolishes the particular rights granted to institutions or religious congregations, and confines religion itself to personal and private subjectivity". Muslim face coverings, according to the French government, hinder universal women's rights and threaten the safety of the public.

== Bill ==
The bill was passed by the National Assembly by a vote of 335–1. The sole vote against the ban in the National Assembly was cast by Daniel Garrigue, who warned that "to fight an extremist behavior, we risk slipping toward a totalitarian society." It was passed by the Senate by a vote of 246–1, with 100 abstentions. The bill prohibits the wearing of face coverings in public places and also applies to foreign tourists visiting France. The law imposes a fine of up to €150, and/or participation in citizenship education, for those who violate the law. The bill also penalises, with a fine of €30,000 and one year in prison, anyone who forces (by violence, threats or by abuse of power) another to wear face coverings; these penalties may be doubled if the victim is under the age of 18. The Constitutional Council of France declared the ban constitutionally valid on 7 October 2010, clearing the final legal obstacle for the law, but the law was designed to come into force after the elapse of six months from the day of its publication in the Journal Officiel.

Article 2 of the law provides that "The prohibition provided for in Article 1 does not apply if the attire is prescribed or authorized by legislative or regulatory provisions [for example a motorcycle helmet], if it is justified for health or professional reasons, or if it is part of sporting activities, parties or artistic or traditional events." Consequently, wearing surgical masks in public, widely practiced during the COVID-19 pandemic, is authorized by this statute.

== Response ==
Dalil Boubakeur, the grand mufti of the Paris Mosque, the largest and most influential in France, testified to parliament during the bill's preparation. He commented that the niqāb was not prescribed in Islam, that in the French and contemporary context its spread was associated with radicalisation and criminal behavior, and that its wearing was inconsistent with France's concept of the secular state; but that due to expected difficulties in applying a legal ban, he would prefer to see the issue handled "case by case". Mohammed Moussaoui, the president of the French Council of the Muslim Faith, opposed using a law but favored discouraging Muslim women from wearing the full veil.

Abroad, in July 2010, hundreds of Muslims protested against the bill in Karachi, Pakistan. The chief of the Pakistan-based Jamaat-e-Islami Party demanded that the UN take immediate action against France. Nasharudin Mat Isa, leader of the Pan-Malaysian Islamic Party, said that the ban had made Muslims around the world angry but stated that he hoped that it would not provoke any terrorist incidents.

Abdel Muti al-Bayyumi, a member of the council of clerics at Al-Azhar Mosque in Cairo, Egypt, applauded the ban and stated that the niqāb has no basis in Sharia. He also said: "I want to send a message to Muslims in France and Europe. The niqab has no basis in Islam. I used to feel dismayed when I saw some of the sisters (in France) wearing the niqab. This does not give a good impression of Islam." Yusuf al Qaradawi, another prominent Egyptian Islamic scholar, stated that in his view "the niqab is not obligatory" while criticizing France for violating the freedom of those Muslim women who hold the view that it is and criticizing France in that "they allow other women to freely dress in a revealing and provocative manner".

Hamza Yusuf criticized the French government for the ban, writing:

While I am personally opposed to the face veil, it is a legitimate, if minority opinion, in the Islamic legal tradition for a woman to wear one. Most women who wear it believe they are following God's injunction and not their husband's. French laicism seems as fundamentalist as the very religious fanatics it wants to keep out. On a trip to France a few years ago, I was shocked to see pornography openly displayed on the streets in large advertisements. How odd that to unveil a woman for all to gape at is civilized, but for her to cover up to ward off gazes is a crime... While the French Prime Minister sees no problem with exposing in public places a woman's glorious nakedness, he is oddly and quite rabidly disturbed by allowing others to cover it up. The sooner secular nations learn to allow people of faith to live their lives in peace, the sooner peace will flourish.

— Hamza Yusuf, Pourquoi No Burqa?

Amnesty International condemned the passage of the bill in the Assembly as a violation of the freedom of expression of those women who wear the burqa or niqab.

RTBF columnist François De Smet responded that this could not be considered a matter of freedom of expression or even religion since face coverings are but a relic of tribal tradition; that it is face coverings that amount to a violation of the freedom of expression as they block the exchange of facial expressions which as Emmanuel Levinas pointed out are the basis for a moral participation in society; and that the neurotic search for purity that motivates facial coverings ultimately represents the "radical rejection of others" and conveys contempt for others who are not deemed worthy of sharing the wearer's facial expressions.

Individuals who continue to battle the legislation argue this law infringes on the human rights of women, possibly even further discriminating against them. Hebah Ahmed, a female Muslim activist, stated when asked about the topic, "I think that it's a bad idea because I think it's yet another example of men telling women how to dress, how to live their life. It's another way to try to control women. And to take it to a government level and to try to legislate the way that a woman dresses is not just wrong and against human rights, but it really violates the whole basis [of] democracy".

Hassen Chalghoumi, a notable imam of the mosque in Drancy near Paris who had earlier received death threats and seen his religious service interrupted by Islamists because he supported dialog with the French Jewish community, later expressed support for the ban. He stated that the full facial covering "has no place in France, a country where women have been voting since 1945" and that "the burqa is a prison for women, a tool of sexist domination and Islamist indoctrination".

=== Salafi jihadism ===
In October 2010, Osama bin Laden accused France of preventing "free women from wearing the burqa" in a released recording. The ban against the face covering veil is a frequent theme in publications linked to Salafi jihadist organisations such as Al-Qaeda and the Islamic State of Iraq and the Levant.

== Implementation ==
The legislators provided that, once the law was declared constitutional, a six-month period for discussion and education of the affected public would follow before the law came into force. In a program overseen by the Muslim women-led Ni Putes Ni Soumises, NGO representatives and social workers conducted individual and group information meetings with women in towns and suburbs with large Muslim populations. The representatives reported instances of some women deciding to file complaints against their husbands once informed of their rights; of some others stating that they were waiting for the law to come into force so that it would compel their husbands to release them from wearing the veil; and of some others stopping the wearing of the facial veil outright after the information meetings. While no disturbances were reported during the personal meetings with the women who could be reached, the representatives reported instances of local Islamic clerics issuing fatwās against them, of being verbally harassed, of being threatened including with implied death threats, and in one case of being physically assaulted by men. In the last preparatory phase, larger meetings and public debates were organised.

Before the law entered into force, French Interior Minister Claude Guéant instructed the police to enforce the law "with tact and sensitivity", and stated that under no circumstances could force be used to remove facial coverings in public; individuals should instead be invited to show their faces to permit identification. Guéant also instructed that people arrested for wearing full facial coverings should be told about the law's motivations in a spirit of education, as the law provides.

=== ECHR case ===
On 22 September 2011, Hind Ahmas and Najate Nait Ali became the first women to be fined under the burqa ban after having been arrested in May for attempting to deliver an almond cake to the mayor of Meaux (a supporter of the ban) whilst wearing niqabs (the French word for fine, amende, is similar in sound to almond.) They were fined 120 and 80 euros, respectively. Hind Ahmas announced her intention to take the case to the European Court of Human Rights. Kenza Drider announced her intention to run for the presidency whilst wearing a niqab.

Some balaclava-wearing sympathisers of Pussy Riot were arrested in Marseille in August 2012 for being in breach of the ban. In 2013, they stood outside Elysée Palace in niqab and subsequently received a criminal conviction. The French criminal courts noted in 2014 that the lower court was wrong to dismiss her rights covered under article 18 but dismissed her appeal. The French delegation argued that wearing face coverings violated the principle of "living together". Judges Nußberger and Jäderblom dissented, calling the concept, "far-fetched and vague." Going on to note that the very decision of declaring what a woman is allowed to wear was hypocritical and antithetical to the aim of protecting human rights. The committee came to the determination in 2018 that the case had been incorrectly dismissed after review by a single judge on the grounds that, "the conditions of admissibility laid down in articles 34 and 35 of the Convention [had] not been met." Upon review the committee concluded that the applicants's human rights had been violated under article 18 and 26 of the International Covenant on Civil and Political Rights. The committee dismissed the notion of "living together" as a vague notion not protected under international law. Under the Optional Protocol, the government of France has been given opportunity to respond before the committee finalises their decision.

=== Reactions to the law's introduction ===
On 9 April 2011, 61 people were arrested in Paris for holding an unauthorized demonstration against the impending law.

The law came into effect on 11 April 2011. To protest the law's introduction several veiled women protested outside Notre Dame de Paris. One of the protestors, Kenza Drider, stated that she was "just expressing [her] freedom to be." The French government stated that the burqa damaged community relations. Supporters of the bill also stated that it promoted gender equality and secularism.

Police unions said in a statement that the enforcement of the law would be "extremely difficult ... if not almost impossible". Interior Minister Claude Guéant pointed out that notwithstanding any implementation difficulties "the role of the police and gendarmerie are to ensure that the law is respected." In fact, there were no publicized enforcement problems at the outset. The few demonstrators being arrested on the first day were brought in for discussion, as planned by the Interior Ministry and as consistent with the law's provision for citizenship education in lieu of a fine, and the first fines were imposed subsequently "without incident".

As of 2011, five months after the law came into effect, the police had noted 100 incidents of women being stopped under the law. None of them led to a punishment, though "fewer than 10" were going through the courts. Some police have wrongly given on-the-spot fines, which were later annulled. French Collective against Islamophobia reported an increase in the number of physical attacks on women wearing the niqab. Hind Ahmas, a protester against the law, was twice arrested for wearing a niqab.

Some law enforcement officers have complained of being attacked, physically while enforcing the law and then afterward in the media's portrayal. In July 2013, a husband allegedly attempted to strangle a police officer during a check of an entirely-veiled woman in Trappes and the next night a group of 250 youths threw projectiles at a police station. Clashes continued the following night and spread to Élancourt and Guyancourt.

In the Mirail district of Toulouse in April 2018, police asked a woman to remove her face covering veil so she could be identified, but she refused and while being taken into the police vehicle started screaming. The French article states that a video recording of the event circulated social media showing the woman being beaten by police. Shortly thereafter, about 30 individuals assaulted the police officers by throwing objects at them. The officers responded with tear gas and stun grenades and had to use their weapons 18 times before being able to leave. Later the same night, there was further rioting associated with this incident in the Renerie and Bellefontaine districts of Toulouse where 11 vehicles were set afire.

On 23 October 2018, the United Nations Human Rights Committee published a statement coming down against France for human rights violations. The committee was responding to two complaints about women being prosecuted for wearing clothing that violated the French ban on face coverings. This was a landmark case for the UN Human Rights Committee seeing as it was the first case by the committee to address the Islamic veil. The committee concluded that France had not provided a strong enough reason for its ban on face veiling. France had initially argued that it was a necessary law in order for their community to better coexist and live in harmony. The UN committee disagreed with this reasoning. Further, the UN committee believed that the ban would strip away the rights of veiled women by ostracizing them from the French community. Following the UN statement, France has 180 days to respond with what steps they are taking to change their law.

Since then, the French Senate has proposed a ban on mothers wearing headscarves when accompanying their children on school field trips. Jean-Michel Blanquer came out in staunch opposition to a pamphlet produced by a French parents association for including the photo of a mother wearing a headscarf. Blanquer has also expressed that the heads of schools should discourage the inclusion of mothers who choose to wear the headscarf, invoking the argument of France's strong secularism. The ban was approved by the French parliament's upper house but rejected in the lower house in May 2019.

== News coverage ==
According to a paper by Friedman and Merle published in Feminist Media Studies, the French news coverage was overall unifying in presenting a narrative of France's identity as a secular nation that respects religious freedom but controls its public expression. Coverage invoked republican values, legacy societal principles, and legislative approval. Very few newspapers offered perspectives that criticized the law. Women who would be directly impacted by the ban were rarely quoted as sources in news coverage.

== Bans on face covering in other states worldwide ==
Countries with bans on face covering as of 2025: Ban in public places Full or partial ban in some localities Ban on sale and manufacturing Ban in some public buildings or in the public workplace

Legal bans on face covering in public exist also in different other states worldwide:

=== Africa ===
- Cameroon
- Chad
- Gabon
- Senegal

=== Asia ===
- Kyrgyzstan
- Sri Lanka
- Tajikistan
- Turkmenistan
- Uzbekistan

=== Europe ===
- Austria
- Belgium
- Bulgaria
- Denmark
- Netherlands
- Luxembourg
- Portugal
- Russia (Stavropol)
- Switzerland

== See also ==
- Anti-mask laws
- Freedom of religion in France
- French law on secularity and conspicuous religious symbols in schools
- France debate over veils
- Human rights in France
- Swiss ban on minarets
- Saudi ban on churches
- Hijab by country
- Islamic dress in Europe
- Quebec ban on face covering
