= Reactive ethnicity =

Reactive ethnicity is the phenomenon where actions intended to limit or ban a practice cause people to continue the practice in protest. Jeffery Reitz has used this term to explain why the French restrictions on traditional Islamic veils are provoking even unveiled Muslim women to wear Islamic veils.

== See also ==
- Backfire effect
- Civil disobedience
- Identity politics
