= French law on secularity and conspicuous religious symbols in schools =

French law

Law 2004-228 of 15 March 2004

French Parliament
- Long title: Law 2004-228 of 15 March 2004 restricting, in application of the principle of secularism, the wearing of signs or clothing showing religious affiliation in public schools, colleges and high schools
- Territorial extent: France
- Passed by: National Assembly
- Passed: 10 February 2004
- Passed by: Senate
- Passed: 3 March 2004
- Signed by: Jacques Chirac
- Signed: 15 March 2004
- Effective: 1 September 2004

Legislative history

Initiating chamber: National Assembly
- Bill citation: N° 1378
- Introduced by: Luc Ferry, Minister of National Education
- Introduced: 28 January 2004
- Committee responsible: Law
- Passed: 10 February 2004
- Voting summary: 494 voted for; 36 voted against
- Committee report: N° 1381

Revising chamber: Senate
- Bill citation: N° 209
- Received from the National Assembly: 11 February 2004
- Committee responsible: Culture
- Passed: 3 March 2004
- Voting summary: 277 voted for; 20 voted against
- Committee report: N° 219

Keywords
- Secularism in France

Text of statute as originally enacted
- Status: In force

The French law on secularity and conspicuous religious symbols in schools bans wearing conspicuous religious symbols in French public primary and secondary schools. The law is an amendment to the French Education Code and expands earlier principles of French law, especially the constitutional requirement of laïcité: the separation of state and religious activities.

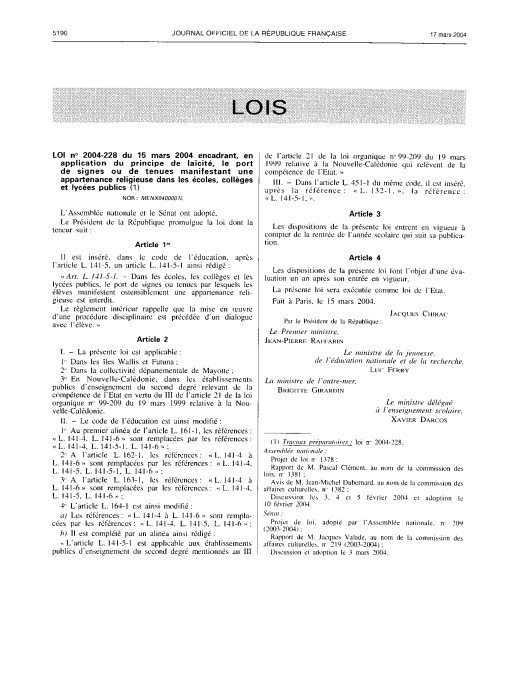
The law as published in the Journal officiel de la République française

The bill passed France's national legislature and was signed into law by President Jacques Chirac on 15 March 2004. It took effect on 2 September 2004.

The law does not mention any particular religious symbol. However, it is considered by many to target the wearing of headscarves by Muslim schoolgirls. (Note: Headscarves: a hijab, considered by many Muslims to be an obligatory article of faith.) For this reason, it is occasionally referred to as the French headscarf ban in the foreign press. Although garments of other religions are also covered by the law, it is seen by some as disproportionately affecting Muslims. Others feel the Islamic veil has become a greater target than other religious symbols as segments of the French public have construed the Islamic veil as inherently opposed to laïcité and values of the republic.

In 2011, France would ban the full-face veil ban (covering niqabs, burqas, and other face-concealing items in public areas).

== Terminology ==
The technical name of the law is "law 2004-228 of 15 March 2004". The full title of the law is "Law 2004–228 of March 15, 2004, Concerning, As an Application of the Principle of the Separation of Church and State, The Wearing of Symbols or Clothing Manifesting Religious Affiliation in Public Primary and Secondary Schools". (Note: French: Loi 2004-228 du 15 mars 2004 encadrant, en application du principe de laïcité, le port de signes ou de tenues manifestant une appurtenance religieuse dans les écoles, collèges et lycées publics in Kent (2023)) This was entered into the code of education as law 141-5-1.

== Background ==
=== French education system ===
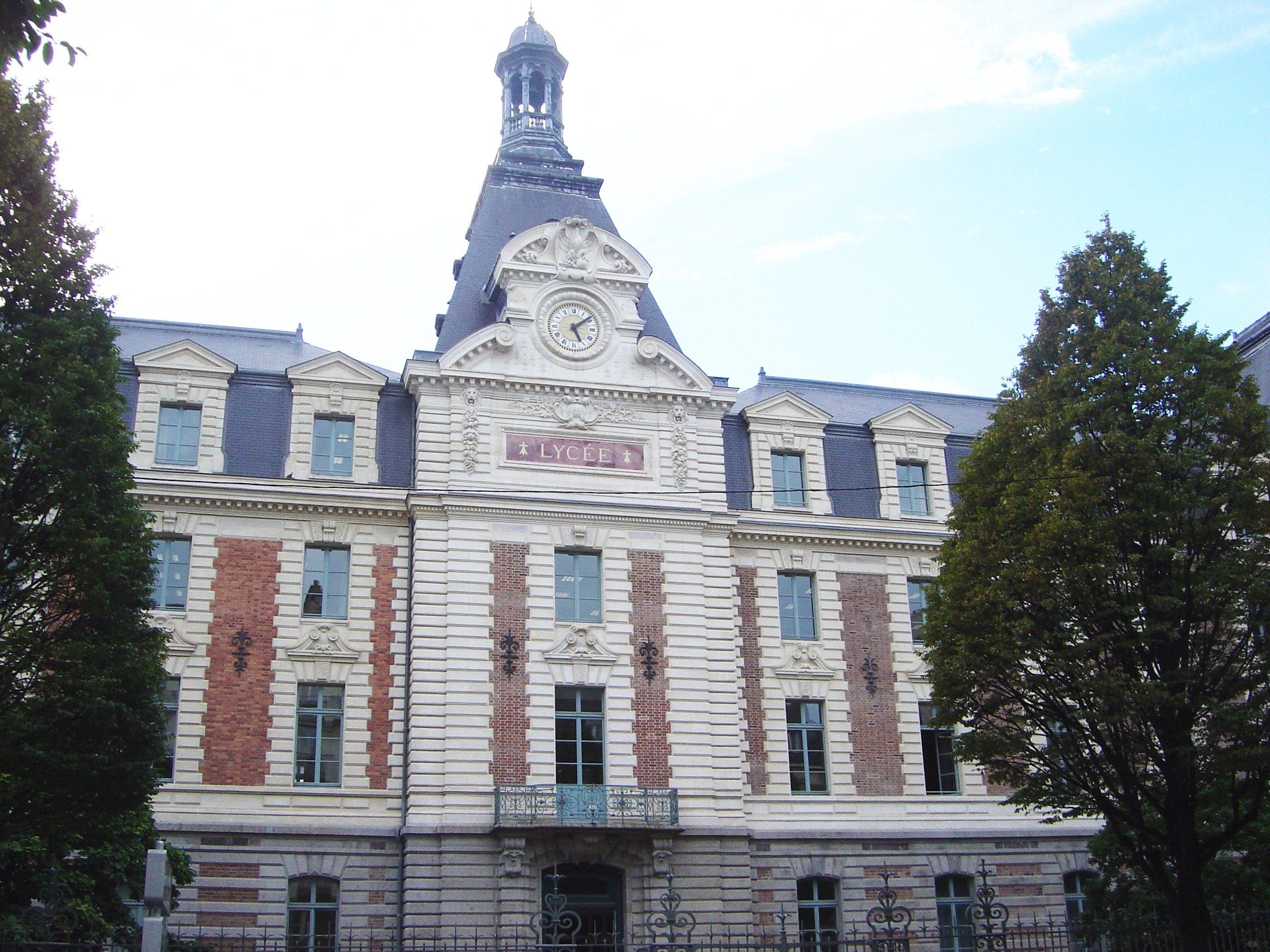
A high school in central Rennes

Education is compulsory in France up to the age of 16. The French system of primary and secondary education consists of:

1. state schools (enseignement public);
2. private schools receiving government subsidies (enseignement privé sous contrat), the vast majority of private schools; and
3. private schools not receiving government subsidies (enseignement privé hors contrat).

Schools in the first two categories are required to apply the same national curricula as defined by the Ministry of Education. The curriculum for schools in the third category is free, provided that students receive at least some minimal skills in writing, mathematics, etc.

The French government highly subsidises private elementary and secondary schools, even those affiliated with religious organizations, as long as they apply the same curriculum as the public schools, with the same academic standards, and that they do not discriminate on grounds of religious affiliation nor make religious education compulsory. It is for instance common that children of agnostic or otherwise non-religious families, or children of families from other religions (including non-Catholic Christians), are put in Catholic schools, if their parents judge these schools to offer better conditions of education or to be more convenient. Consequently, families can use private schools at moderate costs. While there are no accessible official national statistics on the costs of private schools, typical prices per year for low-income families are in the range of a few hundred euros. The average costs are €500 a year per student; however, this statistic includes very expensive, exclusive schools. In addition, according to the figures from the secretariat, more than half of schools have established a price schedule taking into account a family's income; as a result, costs to parents can be as little as €20 to €30 per school month per student.

In addition, the French government operates a distant learning agency, the CNED, which is another solution for families impacted by the normal rules or schedules of public schools.

Laïcité in French Education

French schooling has historically held great authority in upholding laïcité and shaping a French unified national identity. It was not until the late nineteenth century that the government officially secularized schools, when Jules Ferry, Minister of Education at the time, wrote and passed a series of laws called the “Ferry Laws.” Lawmakers enacted Ferry laws between 1882 and 1886. After years of schooling being under supervision by the Ministry of Religion, the Ferry Laws assured that all teachers would be laypersons and schools would allow only secular instruction.

The struggle against Church authority in schools has a legacy that continues on in France today and informs contemporary debates about secularism in France. The school is widely viewed to be key in instilling Republican values. Because of this, religious symbols such as the headscarf are sometimes deemed by portions of the French public as a source of division that threatens the secular nature of public schooling.

=== Islamic point of view on headscarves ===
In Islam, the wearing of a hijab is a duty which is prescribed on all Muslim women, though in the matter discussed in this article it only applies to women. Hijab is often equated with the idea of modesty in all senses including personal, physical and social. While it prescribes restrictions and practices for both men (such as, for example, restraining one's thoughts from objectification of women and covering the aspects of oneself that attract others to them, incorporating the chest and between the navel and knee for many Muslims) and women, it is most known for its religious prescription for a woman to dress modestly and cover her hair.

While for most Muslims the concept of hijab is seen as balanced and consistent with ideas of gender equality, others see the religious prescription on female covering as chauvinistic, patriarchal, oppressive and an enforcement on women and against their rights. Most Muslims living in Western societies concede outright that the forcing of women to wear the headscarf is against Islamic precepts and cannot be accepted, but social pressure can in some cases be strong.

==== Feminist criticisms ====
A number of Islamic feminists see the wearing of the headscarf, and particularly of the full-face veil such as the niqāb, as oppressive of women. French activist and politician Fadela Amara has thus stated: "The veil is the visible symbol of the subjugation of women, and therefore has no place in the mixed, secular spaces of France's public school system."

Feminist criticisms also arose from the French public. This included France’s largest feminist organization Femmes Solidaires, which lobbied in favor of the 2004 law at the Stasi Commission. In a 2006 interview, Femmes Solidaires president, Sabine Salmon explained:

"We [at FS] arrived at the conclusion that for us the headscarf that is worn today in France is not at all a religious symbol but it is a political symbol, with a political project behind it."

Salmon’s statement represents key criticisms that tied the headscarf to Islamist political ideologies, which, in their view, worked to control women’s bodies and promoted a lack of sexual liberty.

Feminist criticisms were echoed among leading politicians at the time. Yvette Roudy, a prominent Socialist Party politician, was an outspoken critic. She declared in 1989, during the heat of the first headscarf affair, “the foulard is the sign of subservience, whether consensual or imposed, in fundamentalist Muslim society… to accept the voile is tantamount to saying ‘yes’ to women’s inequality in French Muslim society.”

== History prior to implementation ==
Since 1905, French governments have enforced a law requiring the separation of church and state, prohibiting the state from recognizing or funding any religion. Schools directly operated by the national or local governments must not endorse or promote any religious dogma (whether endorsing an existing religion or endorsing atheism or any other philosophy). Schools funded totally or in part by the national and local governments by law must not force students into religious education; they should remain equally accessible to children of any, or no, faith. For example, even though a majority of the population nominally professes Catholicism (although far fewer regularly practice Catholicism), state schools have no communal prayers, religious assemblies, or Christian crosses on the walls. The Constitution of France says that France is a laïque (roughly, secular) Republic.

In France, historically, differences between adherents of different religions (and recently, differences between religious and non-religious people) have frequently resulted in deep societal divisions, from the 16th-century Wars of Religion to the late 19th-century Dreyfus Affair. The relations between the Church of France and the state were disputed under Louis XIV (see Gallicanism); they were severely strained during the Revolution of 1789, when the constitutional government of the National Assembly promulgated the Civil Constitution of the Clergy and the Church divided itself into the constitutional clergy, who accepted it, and the ultramontanes, who did not. Roman Catholicism was recognised as the faith of the majority of French citizens, but Napoleon also named Judaism and the Lutheran and Reformed Churches as officially recognised by the state. Although these four 'official' religions received state funding and protection (until the 1905 law as above), they were not given the status of a religion of the state. France had begun to view faith as a matter for each individual citizen rather than for a nation as a whole.

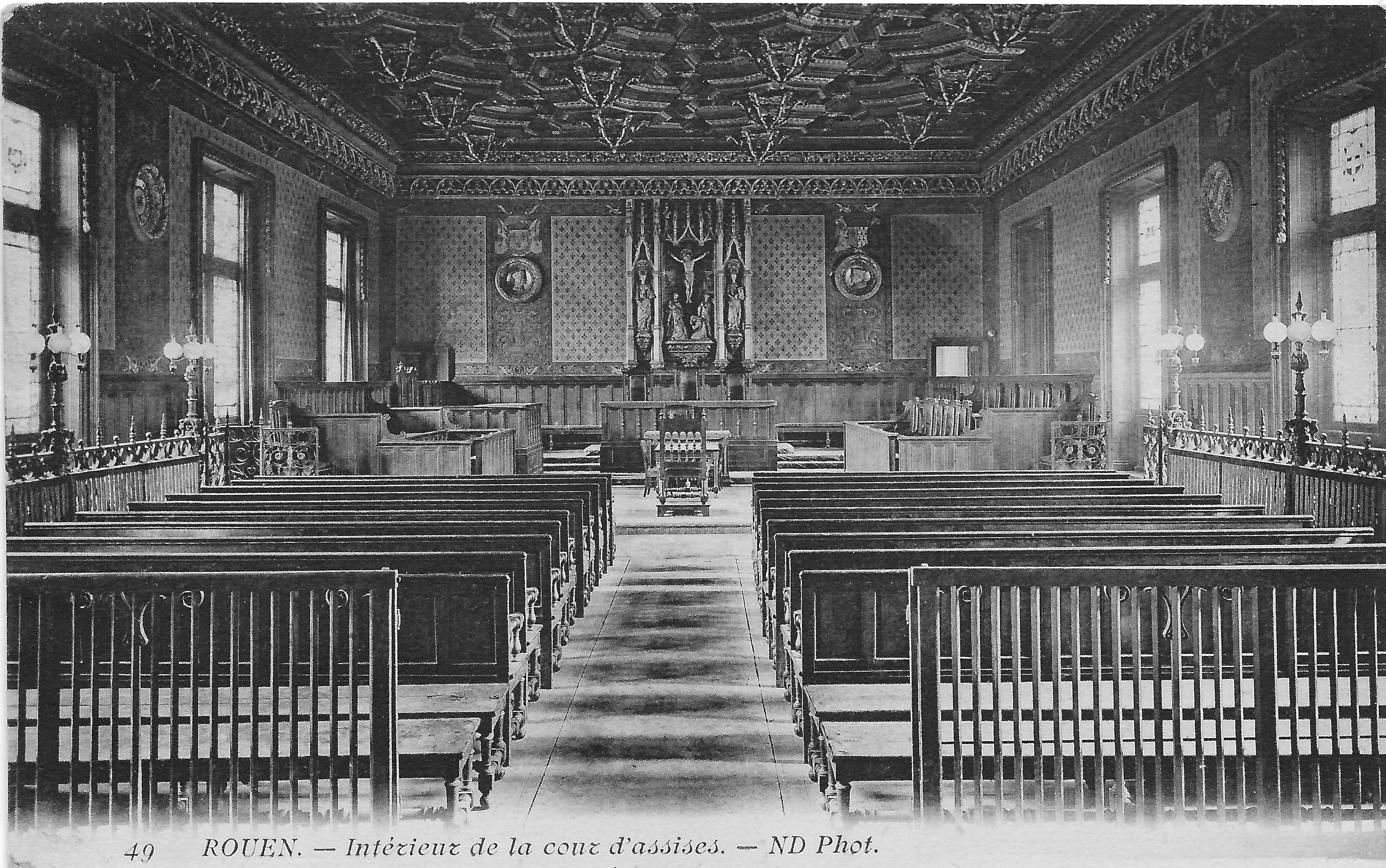
A cross in a French law court before 1905

As a result of this history, religious manifestations are considered undesirable in state schools; primary and secondary schools are supposed to be neutral spaces where children can learn away from political or religious pressures, controversies and quarrels. Because of this neutrality requirement, students are normally prohibited from conducting religious proselytising or political activism on the premises.

Civil servants are expected to stay neutral with respect to politics and religion when they perform their duties. More generally, during the course of the performance of their duties, they are expected to behave in a reserved manner, to do this, they must refrain from making any comments and refrain from staging any demonstrations that may be considered political, religious, or biased in some other way and they must also refrain from endorsing particular religious or partisan political views which are not endorsed by the government. By law, teaching personnel in state schools must not endorse any political or religious point of view; they may also face sanctions for wearing overt religious symbols.

=== 1980s and 1990s ===
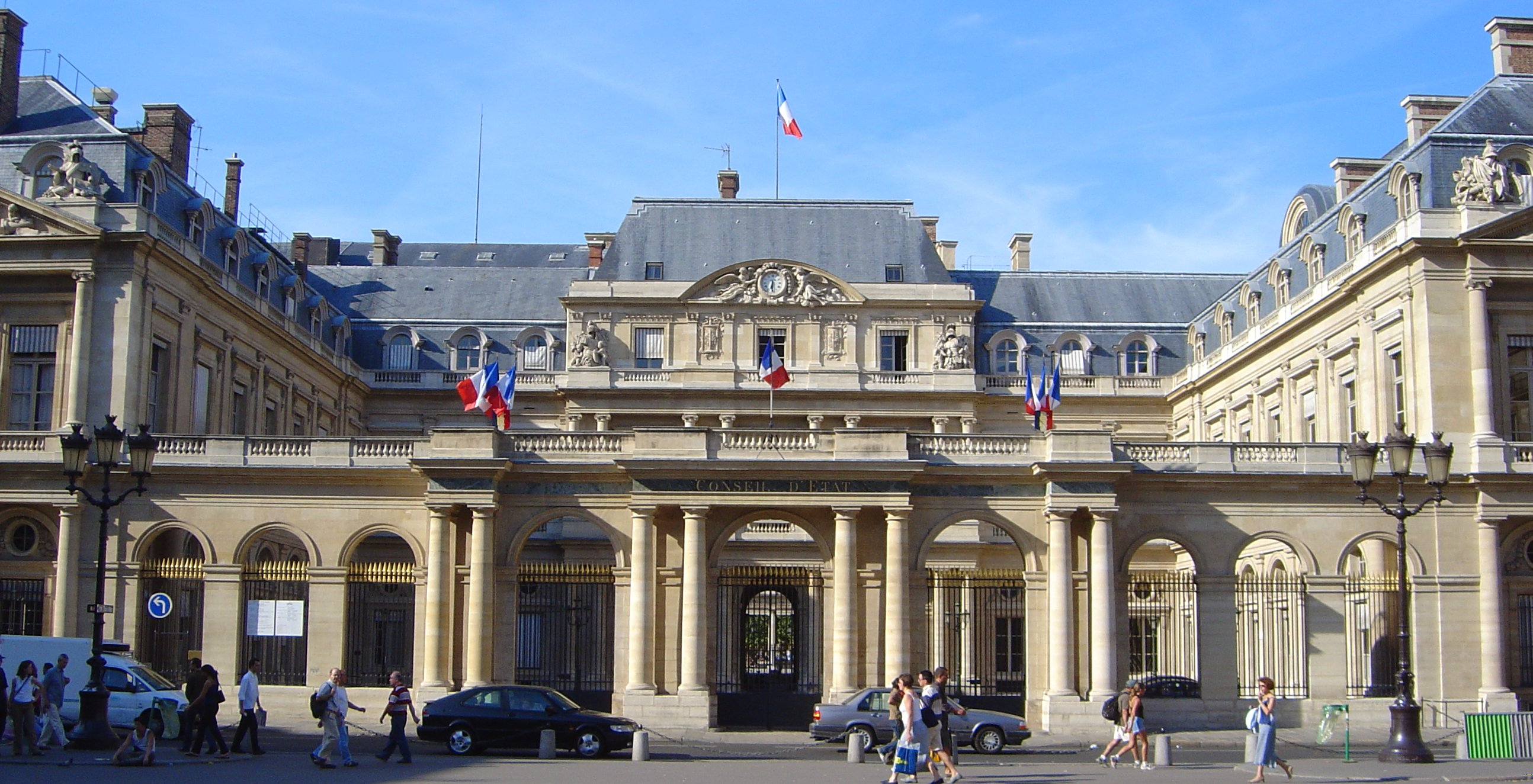
Because the law was unclear, the Conseil d'État was called in for legal analyses, then for settling litigation.

For many years school administrators have accepted, or tolerated, that schoolchildren wear symbols of their various religions, such as a Christian student wearing a cross, or a Jewish student wearing a kippah. However, there was some leeway and uncertainty in those matters, and occasionally some students faced disciplinary action for overly ostentatious attire.

Many people find crosses and yarmulkes acceptable, but not headscarves, for a variety of reasons. Some feminists do not consider them as religious symbols, but as symbols of female alienation, or dangerous signs of mounting communautarisme (ethnicisation of social relationships, which the French do not view favorably), rising Islamist movements, or attacks on the Republic, are sometimes deemed 'foreign' and 'un-French'. However, some people regard the wearing of headscarves as a feminist choice and do not view this as fundamentally different from other choices relating to clothing. The fact that most Muslims in France come from former French colonies has added a racist/antiracist tint to the debate. The issue has deeply divided France and debate has raged on ever since.

The issue of religion has wider implications than the mere wearing of headscarves, which contributed to the complexity of the debate. Occasionally, Muslim students have refused to attend certain classes when they or those influencing them deemed aspects of their faith to be contradicted (such as swimming classes or physical education); or insisted on attending them in Islamic garb, thus raising the question of whether this purported solution denatured the intended activity.

The wearing of the headscarf was also criticized as a means to enforce peer pressure on the girls not wearing it. One defense against this argument was that the ratio of Muslim girls to other girls was not always high in classrooms, and that scarf wearing did not necessarily reflect proselytizing intent; but a countervailing relevant issue was that the relevant group being pressured was Muslim girls not wearing the scarf, who could sometimes be endangered inside or outside school unless they submitted to wearing the scarf like their classmates.

Because of the absence of unambiguous law, action was taken on a case-by-case basis against students wearing ostensible religious garb, with differences of practice between establishments. School administrators, in such cases, were taken into legal, social and media quarrels far beyond their ordinary responsibilities. This was highlighted by the 1989 Affaire du Foulard ("the headscarf affair"), when three young girls were expelled from their school in Creil, near Paris, for refusing to take off their headscarves. This caused such an uproar that administrators realized something had to be done soon to regain control.

Because of these difficulties, public powers sought a more consistent approach. In 1989, the Minister of Education requested the legal analysis of the Conseil d'État on the issue of whether or not school administrators could, or should, expel students for wearing religious symbols, within the current framework of applicable regulations, laws, constitutional rights and international conventions. The general assembly of the Conseil gave a detailed analysis, containing the following opinion:

It results from the above that, in teaching establishments, the wearing by students of symbols by which they intend to manifest their religious affiliation is not by itself incompatible with the principle of laïcité, as it constitutes the free exercise of freedom of expression and of manifestation of religious creeds, but that this freedom should not allow students to sport signs of religious affiliation that, due to their nature, or the conditions in which they are worn individually or collectively, or due to their ostentatious and provocative character, would constitute an act of pressure, provocation, proselytism or propaganda, or would harm the dignity or the freedom of the student or other members of the educative community, or would compromise their health or safety, or would perturb the educational activities or the education role of the teaching personnel, or would trouble public order in the establishment or the normal functioning of the public service.

On 2 November 1992, the Conseil ruled that a school regulation prohibiting all philosophical or religious signs, including those that were worn, was excessively sweeping and against the principle of laïcité.

On 14 March 1994, the Conseil ruled that a school regulation prohibiting any headgear was excessive (the intent of this regulation was to prohibit the wearing of certain religious signs). The Conseil found that this regulation was excessively sweeping, without a clear need for it to be so.

On 10 March 1995, the Conseil upheld the expelling of three students from a highschool, on the basis that the three students gravely perturbed classes, infringing on school rules and the alleged prohibition of proselytism. One factor was the insistence of the students on wearing the scarf during sports classes, which was deemed inappropriate attire for such an activity. It also upheld some stipulations of the school regulations which restricted the wearing of signs of a religious, philosophical or political character, with the same legal analysis as the 1989 one cited above.

On 11 September 1995, three families appealed before the Conseil rulings of lower administrative courts, which had upheld decisions by high schools to exclude their daughters because they wore the veil; and the Minister of Education appealed rulings of lower courts that had declared illegal three exclusion decisions. The actual legal reasons differed slightly; however, in every case, on 27 November 1996, the Conseil ruled that the children had been inappropriately expelled, considering that the headscarf worn by the student, while it expressed the student's religious beliefs, did not have a protest or ostentatious character, nor did wearing it constitute in any case an act of pressure or proselytism.

The opinion and the decisions of the Conseil, which established some kind of case law, still left a considerable margin of appreciation to school administrators, which led to many tensions and embarrassments. It was thus argued that clear and consistent rules should be enacted.

=== Stasi commission's report ===
In July 2003, French President Jacques Chirac set up an investigative committee (commission Stasi) to examine how the principle of laïcité should apply in practice. It consisted of 20 people headed by Bernard Stasi, then ombudsman of France (médiateur de la République). While an obvious focus of the commission was wearing religious attire in public schools, the commission noted in its report that the issues went further.

The Stasi Commission published its report on 11 December 2003, considering that ostentatious displays of religion violated the secular rules of the French school system. The report recommended a law against pupils wearing "conspicuous" signs of belonging to a religion, meaning any visible symbol meant to be easily noticed by others. Prohibited items would include headscarves for Muslim girls, yarmulkes for Jewish boys, and turbans for Sikh boys. The Commission recommended allowing the wearing of discreet symbols of faith such as small crosses, Stars of David or Fatima's hands.

The Senate commission based its report on multiple sources: school representatives, headmasters, teachers; political associations, such as Ni Putes Ni Soumises or SOS Racisme; representatives of the main religions; (Note: Because Islam is not a hierarchical religion in the way that Roman Catholicism is (the only hierarchical structure being the currently-defunct Caliphate), it is not obvious which religious representatives should be engaged in discussion by public powers. In addition, contrary to other religious tendencies such as Protestantism, Islam did not have an umbrella organisation in France. To remedy this last issue, in 2003 Nicolas Sarkozy, then Minister of the Interior, set up the French Council of the Muslim Faith, which the State uses as a discussion partner for such issues. This elected council is equivalent in recognition to similar representative groups of other faiths.) or leaders of human-rights organizations.

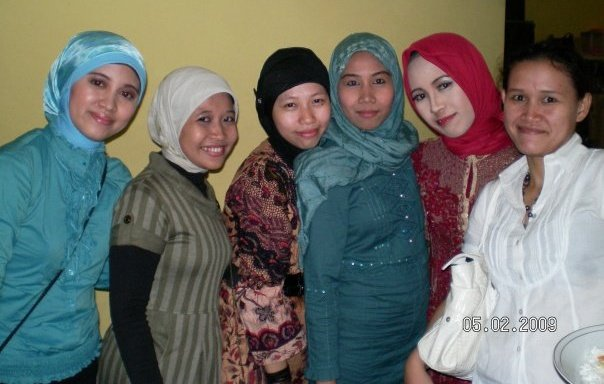
Most of the debate about the law centred on the use of the hijab (similar to the one worn by these Indonesian women) by female Muslim students.

The Commission's report emphasised that publicly funded schools in France should transmit knowledge, teach students critical awareness, assure autonomy and openness to cultural diversity, and encourage personal development. Schooling aims both to train students for a professional career, and to make them into good citizens of the French Republic. The report states that such a mission presupposes fixed common rules, like gender equality and respect for secularity.

Most of the debate has centered on hijab – the Islamic dress code, which may include a headscarf for women, but more generally, on the wearing of religious or political symbols in schools. The wearing of headscarves in school started comparatively recently in mainland France (since the late 1980s), and has become the focus of the conflict. The increasing number of visible headscarves has been attributed by some to a rise in extremist activity in France, in particular in poor immigrant suburbs. However intellectuals such as Xavier Ternisien of Le Monde Diplomatique have maintained that the indubitable rise in religious observance is not linked with Islamic extremism, but with the frustration of children of immigrants no longer accepting to remain invisible as their parents often were. Further it is often associated with the idea of Muslim communities feeling settled and established in, and thus a part of, in French society such that they feel comfortable in expressing their identity.

The Commission identified the following positions with regard to wearing the Muslim headscarf:

- For those wearing it, the headscarf can have different meanings. The wearers may have exercised a free personal choice to wear the headscarf; or external pressure may have forced them to do so. Most French people find this idea of constraint or pressure particularly intolerable when it relates to young girls (some girls start wearing a headscarf before the age of 11).

The purpose of dressing according to hijab varies from person to person. Some women see the headscarf as a way to preserve their modesty and prevent any sexual attractions as in western countries. Some see it as a form of liberation above the sexualisation and consumerism of modern society. Others see it as a patriarchal article intended to keep women hidden and subservient.

The representatives of the main religions and leaders of human rights organisations have expressed several objections to a law banning the wearing of religious symbols. They believe it will lead to the stigmatisation of Muslims, exacerbate anti-religious sentiment, promote the image of a France that restricts personal freedom, and encourage Muslim girls to drop out of schools if they feel forced to choose between schooling and their faith.

The Commission said that the Republic must clarify this situation.

A section of the report which received less media attention recommended that the school system make Yom Kippur and Eid (festival) into vacation days each year: currently, only some Christian holidays are vacation days (see Holidays in France); students who want to celebrate other festivities have to take some work day off with the authorisation of their parents. However, for critics and Muslims this did not balance out affairs: the banning of Muslim girls from freely choosing to wear an article of faith, seen by them as a religious obligation, could not be balanced with the permission to celebrate a religious festival, which is not obligatory at all.

The report also recommended enacting a ban on conspicuous symbols of political affiliation. The French National Assembly has not taken up these proposals.

The Commission also noted that occasionally pupils refuse to attend school because of the presence of teachers of the opposite sex, or refuse to attend certain classes (such as gymnastics or swimming lessons). The Commission suggested that only schools or state-recognised doctors (not simply parents) should have the right to grant exemptions.

== Passage, enforcement and interpretations of the law ==
In December 2003, President Jacques Chirac decided to act on the part of the Stasi report which recommended the banning of conspicuous religious symbols from schools. This meant that the legislature could adopt the recommendations, according to the emergency procedure, in January or February, ready for application at the start of the next school year in September 2004.

On 10 February 2004, the lower house voted by a large majority (494 for, 36 against, 31 abstentions) in support of the ban, which includes the caveat that the ban will be reviewed after it has operated for one year.

The initiators of the law are said to have particularly targeted two items of clothing: the headscarf and the veil (French: foulard and voile respectively); however the law mentions neither and just addresses "ostentatious" ("conspicuous") symbols. Because of its terse, broad, vague terms, the law will leave a lot of its interpretation to the administrative and judicial authorities.

The headscarf (sometimes referred to as the hijab in both French and English) covers the hair, ears, neck, and sometimes the shoulders, but not the face. Most Muslim girls who cover their heads in school wear such a headscarf. More rarely, girls may also wear a complete dress covering their body (djelbab). The full or Afghan burka, which covers the entire body except for a slit or grille to see through, occurs more commonly as the dress of an adult woman than that of a schoolgirl. A recent controversy occurred when a mother who wore a full burka became a representative of parents in a city school. Rather than encourage public participation of such women, her participation in school deliberations while entirely covered was highly criticised. It was finally tolerated.

In order to enforce the law, effective decisions on whether certain items are "ostentatious" or not will have to be made. In order to achieve that:

- the Minister of Education will issue circulaires, or instructions for its services; it seems that large crosses, full hijabs or yarmulkes would be banned, while small symbols such as small Stars of David or crosses in pendants would not be;
- headmasters will have to judge whether particular attire is or not acceptable with respect to the law;
- if necessary, families will go to administrative courts to challenge the school authorities' decision; a final decision may not be reached until the Conseil d'État at litigation (supreme administrative court), decides some points of jurisprudence.

The law itself may not be challenged before French courts (since this would have warranted action before the Constitutional Council before the signing of the law); however, the courts may significantly curtail its application — especially given the inherent margin of appreciation of what is ostentatious or not.

The law will apply in France and its overseas territories (which France administers as a part of its metropolitan territory), but it is likely that appropriate enforcement measures will depend on the local context, given the margin of appreciation offered by the law. Overseas Countries and Territories with a large Muslim community will receive some exemptions. For example, it was suggested that Mayotte girls may wear small bandanas and light veils (kishall).

== Immediate reactions ==
=== Responses from within France ===
The proposed ban was extremely controversial in and outside of France, with both sides of the political spectrum being split on the issue.

In 2004, French Cardinal Bernard Panafieu, the Archbishop of Marseille called the ban "unenforceable". While agreeing that some Muslim immigrants have had trouble adjusting to a "lay, pluralistic society" he asserted that the ban was wrong as it prevented Muslims from "asserting their identity" and that it would be "better to act through persuasion than by compulsion" if the state wanted to limit the use of religious symbols.

==== Civil reaction ====
On 14 February 2004, the Associated Press reported that "Thousands of people, many of them women wearing headscarves, marched in France ... to protest a law banning the Islamic coverings and other religious apparel in public schools."

Polls suggest that a large majority of the French favour the ban. A January 2004 survey for Agence France-Presse showed 78% of teachers in favour. A February 2004 survey by CSA for Le Parisien showed 69% of the population for the ban and 29% against. For Muslims in France, the February survey showed 42% for and 53% against. Among surveyed Muslim women, 49% approved the proposed law, and 43% opposed it.

Complex reasons may influence why an individual either supports or opposes this amendment. They range from ensuring sex equality, preventing girls from being pressured into wearing the headscarf, boys into wearing turbans (for example), or a desire to see the Muslim community assimilated into French society on the one hand; to uphold freedoms of expression or conscience or religion, preventing the state from imposing restrictions on what a person can or cannot wear, preventing state victimisation of a minority group and opposing what may be seen as discrimination against Muslims on the other.

Pushback to the amendment additionally stems from segments of the French public linking the Islamic veil to various socio-political domestic and foreign issues. The veil is predominantly tied to Islamic violence, an idea that was often promoted in French media. One young Muslim interviewed on the subject explained that “for the average viewer, the conclusion is obvious: headscarf = Islam = terrorism.” The equation of the headscarf and Islamic violence was especially prevalent during ongoing violence in Algeria throughout the debates on the amendment. This violence felt particularly close to the French public, considering their past colonial rule in the region.

==== Parliamentary reactions ====
While all major political parties were somewhat divided on the issue, all major parties (the majority UMP and UDF, the opposition PS) supported the law.

However, André Victor, member of Workers' Struggle wrote in his article Islamic Hijab and the Subjugation of Women 25 April 2003 that:

"Sarkozy has spoken out against hijab on passport photos, and presumably earned the approval of millions of voters, which was probably the real purpose of this exercise in demagoguery[...] Therefore, this policy leads to increase the weight of the most reactionary religious authorities within the immigrant population."

==== Legal arguments against ====
Some critics have raised a legal point: they see the law as incompatible with the European convention on fundamental human rights. The Stasi Commission responded: The European Court in Strasbourg protects laïcité when it is a fundamental value of the State. It allows limits to the freedom of expression in public services, especially when it is a matter of protecting minors against external pressures. The Commission considers that the expression of an individual's religion in the French state has to comply with the basic rules regarding the secular nature of the state and has to comply with the requirements of equality between the sexes and the safeguarding of the rights of minors. Similar debates on the education of girls in headscarves have long raged in secular-yet-Muslim Turkey; the European Court of Human Rights upheld the laws of Turkey, which are more restrictive than the French law; it therefore seems highly unlikely it would declare the French law contrary to the Convention.

Another piece of legal criticism is that a full-fledged law was not needed to enforce a measure that basically amounts to a new set of school regulations. Any binding document of lesser value (such as a décret or an arrêté ministeriel) would have had a similar effect. Since the writing of the Napoleonic Code, a principle of French law has been that it must be, in the words of the great legislator Portalis, "general and abstract." Critics therefore argue that, by legislating on issues that could be solved with texts other than laws, the French legislature lowers the values of the law in general. Article 34 of the Constitution of France vests power in Parliament to legislate on the "fundamental principles of teaching", leaving the application of these principles to the executive branch. By legislating on such minutiae, the argument goes, Parliament may have overstepped the "domain of the law" (domaine de la loi) that is set out by the Constitution only for the sake of pleasing the media and some interest groups. However, a counter-argument is that the Conseil d'État, ruling according to current statute law, considered that sweeping prohibitions of religious attire or headgear by administrative authorities was contrary to law.

=== Responses from beyond France ===
==== Human rights NGOs ====
Some international human rights' organisations criticised the law. Human Rights Watch stated:

The proposed law is an unwarranted infringement on the right to religious practice. For many Muslims, wearing a headscarf is not only about religious expression, it is about religious obligation.

The United States Commission on International Religious Freedom said:

In February 2004, the Commission issued a public statement expressing concern over the proposed new law. The Commission expressed particular concern that the proposed restrictions may violate France's international human rights commitments. The Commission also stated that though increased immigration in France in recent years has created new challenges for the French government, including integration of these immigrants into French society as well as problems of public order, these challenges should be addressed directly, and not by inappropriately limiting the right to freedom of thought, conscience, religion, and belief. The French government's promotion of its understanding of the principle of secularism should not result in violations of the internationally recognized individual right to freedom of religion or belief.

In 2012, the United Nations Human Rights Committee stated that the expulsion of a Sikh pupil from his school in 2008 because of his Sikh turban or keski was a violation of the International Covenant on Civil and Political Rights signed by France.

==== Jihadists ====
Several members of Al-Qaeda criticized the law: Ayman al-Zawahiri criticized the law in 2004 and considered it to be part of an ongoing campaign against Islam by "Crusaders", Abu Mus’ab al-Zarqawi criticized the law in 2005. In 2009 Al-Qaeda in the Islamic Maghreb called France the "mother of all evils" and urged revenge against France for its “fierce war on our daughters who wore Hijab”.

==== International ====
Various commentators outside of France condemned the law based on what they saw as its racist implications. Susan Price, an Australian activist, argued that "the wedge-politics of racism has always been used to divide the working class, which in France pulled off spectacular rolling strikes against the government in 2003," adding that "the current attack must also be seen as part of a continuum of racist policies which go back to the mid-1990s and the 'Fortress Europe' policies of the major European capitalist governments" designed "to appeal to the support base of Jean-Marie Le Pen’s right-wing National Front (FN)."

Similar arguments were made at the time by American anti-racist activist, Sharon Smith, who added the claim that Muslim women in France opposing the 2004 law were fighting against the same "state-imposed oppression" as women in Afghanistan were opposing by seeking freedom to choose to refrain from wearing burkas.

== Enforcement ==
The law came into effect on 2 September 2004, with the new school year. In September 2005, the Ministry of Education reported that only 12 students showed up with distinctive religious signs in the first week of classes, compared to 639 in the preceding year. A number of students have elected to take state-provided distance-learning classes from CNED. There was one case of a Sikh student in the académie of Créteil, who refused to remove his turban.

The decision caused an outcry from many Muslims across the world and their allies, calling it a violation of freedom of practicing their religion. In addition to protests of a few thousand people in Paris, there were protests of up to a few hundred people in other countries, especially in the Muslim world.

As a consequence of the law, the years following the ban has seen an increasing number of independent Islamic secondary schools being established, some Muslim female students chose to study at home, and others left France with their families.

== Interpretation ==
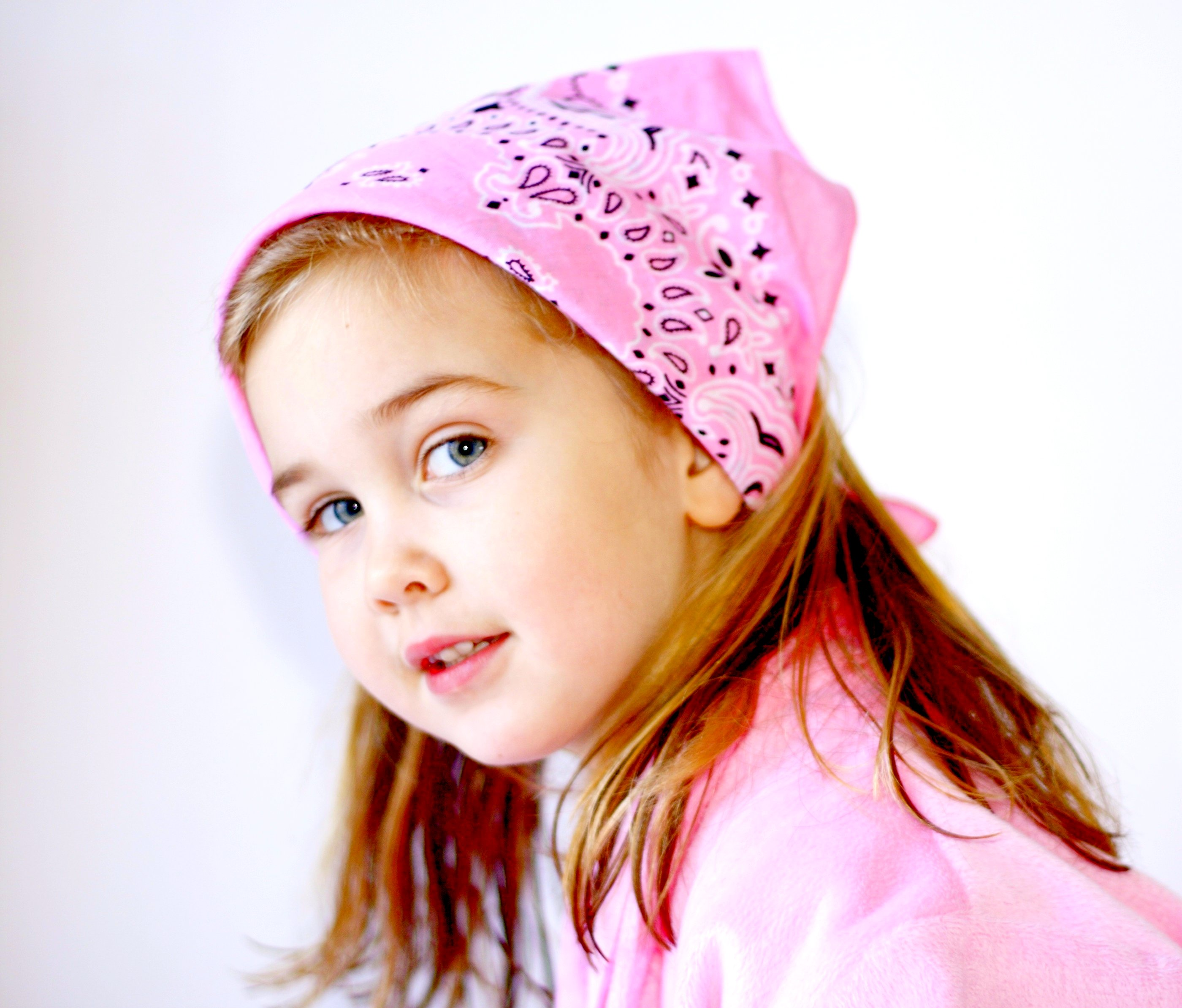
The French law was made deliberately vague, so that if a girl wore a bandanna scarf, and the school decided it was a fashion statement, then it would be legal, but if the school decided it was a religious symbol, then it would be illegal.

In some schools, the ban was also applied to long skirts and headbands, or anything else that the school assumed suggested expression of a religious identity. There are intentionally no specific rules, sometimes resulting in arbitrary interpretations by individual school employees, and inconsistent application. According to Luc Ferry, the Minister of National Education when the law was passed, the schools were empowered to prohibit anything they wished to, even hairstyles or wearing clothing of a color that the school decided had a "religious meaning", even if in actuality, they do not. Between January 2014 and April 2015, the Collective Against Islamophobia in France documented 130 cases of schools across France objecting to girls' clothing, mostly involving longer skirts, but also cases involving headbands that school officials said were too wide, or sweaters.

In April 2015, a 15-year-old schoolgirl in northeastern France was sent home for wearing a plain black maxi skirt, a white shirt, and a pale pink sweater to school, with no head scarf, or anything else to indicate her faith or lack thereof. The school deemed wearing a long skirt to be a "provocation" and an "ostentatious sign" of her religion, especially since several other girls had worn maxi skirts recently, and sent her home to change clothes. This incident caused worldwide controversy and infuriated many of the country's Muslims, who saw the school system's punishment of the girl as racially and religiously discriminatory.

== Abaya ban ==
France banned Muslim girls in state schools from wearing abayas. In August 2023, French education minister, Gabriel Attal, said that the long, flowing dresses worn by some Muslim women, would be banned as they breached the "principle of secularism", particularly by those pupils "wearing religious attire like abayas and long shirts.”

On 4 September, first day of the new academic year, French schools sent 67 Muslim girls home for refusing to remove their abayas.

On 5 September, a 15-year-old girl living in Lyon arrived at school wearing jeans, T-shirt and an open kimono - a common and popular traditional Japanese garment with no religious history. The school denied her entry. On behalf of the female student, human rights lawyer Nabil Boudi on September 22, 2023 lodged a complaint in the United Nations alleging racism, racial discrimination, xenophobia and related intolerance, over “discrimination the girl student faced on the grounds of her religious affiliation".

== See also ==
- Alma and Lila Lévy
- Civil religion
- Feminism in France
- Freedom of religion in France
- Islam in France
- Islamic dress in Europe
- Islamic scarf controversy in France
- Quebec Charter of Values, similar legislation proposed in Quebec in 2013
- R v Headteacher and Governors of Denbigh High School, ex p Begum, a similar controversy in England
- Religion in France
- Religious pluralism
- Religious symbols in classrooms
- Secular education
- Sikhism in France
