= Islamic scarf controversy in France =

Controversy over wearing of the hijab in France

Burqa bans in Europe as of 2025: National ban – country bans people from wearing full-face veils in public Local ban – cities or regions ban full-face veils Partial ban – government bans full-face veils in some locations

In France, there is an ongoing social, political, and legal debate concerning the wearing of the hijab and other forms of Islamic coverings in public spaces. The issue is closely tied to the French principle of laïcité (state secularism), which requires the government and public institutions to remain neutral in matters of religion. The debate began in 1989, when three students were suspended from a public school for refusing to remove their headscarves. Since then, it has expanded to include questions about religious freedom, national identity, gender equality, and the integration of Muslim communities into French society. Supporters of restrictions argue that religious symbols conflict with secular values, while critics argue that such policies limit individual freedoms and disproportionately affect Muslim women.

Since 1989, the debate has grown to include the wearing of Islamic coverings on public beaches, when playing sports, and by politicians. The larger debate involves the concept of laïcité (secularism), the place of Muslim women in French society, differences between Islamic doctrine and Islamic tradition, the conflict between communitarianism and the French policy of minority assimilation, discussions of the "Islamist threat" to French society, and Islamophobia.

According to several researchers, the 2004 headscarf ban "reduces the secondary educational attainment of Muslim girls and affects their trajectory in the labor market and family composition in the long run."

== History ==
The initial affaire du foulard was sparked on 18 September 1989 when three female Moroccan students were suspended for refusing to remove their head scarves in class at Collège Gabriel Havez (a middle school) in Creil. The students reached an agreement with the school on 9 October 1989, under which they wore the headscarves on school grounds but removed them once they entered their classrooms. On 10 October 1989, the girls again refused to take off their scarves when in class. The girls' actions received more and more press coverage, and Muslim advocacy organizations became involved. In November 1989, the Conseil d'État ruled that the scarf's quasi-religious expression was compatible with the laïcité of public schools, as secularism statutes applied to the schools themselves, not the pupils. That December, minister of education Lionel Jospin issued a statement declaring that educators were responsible for allowing or banning the wearing of the scarf in classes on a case-by-case basis.

In September 1994, a new memorandum, the "François Bayrou memo", was issued, delineating the difference between "discreet" religious symbols able to be brought into classrooms, and "ostentatious" religious symbols (including the hijab), which were to be forbidden in public establishments. In October of that year, students at Lycée Saint-Exupéry (a high school) in Mantes-la-Jolie organized a protest in favor of the right to wear the veil in classrooms. In November, 24 veiled students were suspended from the same high school as well as from Lycée Faidherbe in Lille.

Between 1994 and 2003, around 100 female students were suspended or expelled from middle and high schools for wearing the scarf in class. In nearly half of these cases, their exclusions were annulled by the French courts.

Scholars have drawn connections between France's regulations on headscarves and historical colonialism, as well as France's difficulties in assimilating the Muslim population into society. Joan Scott argued that right-wing parties (including Jean-Marie Le Pen's National Front) used the controversies to conflate North African immigrants with Islamic fundamentalism.

== Political and cultural context ==
=== Political positions ===
The most debated point is whether or not students have the right to wear the scarf in classes in public establishments such as primary and secondary schools, as well as universities. Meanwhile, the controversy has contributed to discussions of the principle of secularism, which is the foundation of the 1905 law of separation of church and state in France. The two principal positions that have emerged are:

- A complete preservation of the "principle of secularism" as an element of freedom. This is the position taken most notably by Jacques Chirac as well as by certain leftists such as Jean-Pierre Chevènement.
- An abandonment of the principle of secularity for the benefit of total religious freedom, and for the recognition of religious communities. This Anglo-Saxon-based community model was defended most notably by Nicolas Sarkozy, as well as some leftists and certain Greens.

This debate has thus contributed in blurring the limits between the left and right on the traditional spectrum in France, and has revealed divergences on new political levels, especially between "republicans" (proponents of intervention by the secular Republic) and "liberals" (in an older sense of the French term referring to those who support the liberties of the individual).

=== Muslim tradition ===
The tradition of the headscarf itself has been in existence since before the advent of Islam, and depictions of Mary, mother of Jesus, show her wearing a hair covering. In Orthodox Judaism, many married women cover their hair with a form of headscarf, called a "tichel".

The importance assigned to head covering varies, from that of colorful head scarves that do not conceal much hair in sub-Saharan Africa, to head scarves that cover the hair and neck to the extent that it should cover all hair, as worn in much of the world, to clothes that cover parts of the face (Yemen), and in Saudi Arabia, the entire body, must be covered by the veil (burqa), as is the case in some areas of Pakistan.

In most Muslim societies, this obligation is not enforced by law. In Egypt and Turkey, for example, wearing the scarf is controversially forbidden in certain professional contexts.

=== Motivations of French Muslims who wear the scarf ===
The wearing of the scarf or hijab in France, and in the main countries of origin of French Muslims (Algeria, Tunisia, Morocco, Turkey), is a relatively recent phenomenon which has been coined "the new veiling" by A. E. MacLeod.

France-centered arguments were voiced at the time of this controversy in order to justify students' wearing of the scarf in public schools:

- "Respectability" and "discretion." News, movies, and music aimed at young men often contain stereotypical "easy girl" characters who are sexually taken at will and who are always un-scarfed. This leads many to entertain the idea that women who show their hair are not respectable and are offered (or are offering themselves) sexually to everyone. More generally, advertising and the media present a standard model of how Western women may be assumed to be. This vision of Western women offered by media may lead French Muslim women to wear the veil to affirm their respectability and gain independence from their families who might otherwise be hesitant to allow them that freedom. Some veiled women, while very independent, are using the traditional argument for discretion in order to insist on their right to wear the veil at school.
- Muslim identity in the face of what is considered French bigotry against Muslims. Wearing the scarf is also a way for French Muslim women to guard their identity.
- Avoidance of violence in poor neighborhoods, where unveiled women are not safe since they may be targeted for attack by Islamic morality patrols (a concept of the Wahhabi school of thought, a minority which is criticized by other schools of Islam).

According to a 2008 study by Stephen Croucher in the Journal of Intercultural Communication Research, "Muslims deem the Islamic veil or hijab to be a fundamental part of their identity." Muslims believe that the hijab or veil is symbol of Islam that should not fall under the French idea of secularism. Thus, many French-Muslims claimed that the law banning the veil in public schools was aimed at "forcefully integrating" the Muslim population by restricting their identity.

There also exists a notable minority of French non-Muslims who have expressed support for the right to wear the veil in public schools.

=== Motivations of French people opposed to allowing hijabs to be worn in schools ===
==== Feminist arguments ====
According to some feminist groups, as well as some human rights advocacy groups, wearing the scarf can symbolize a woman's submission to men. It is feared that permitting the veil in schools risks opening the door to other practices that exist in the Muslim world.

It is often speculated that forbidding the hijab would limit freedom. Rather, the argument put forward by some feminists is that the hijab is not a free choice, but a result of social pressures (i.e., if a law does not forbid the practice of wearing the hijab, social pressure may render it obligatory).

These arguments are shared by some Islamic feminists. Thus, Fadela Amara, the former president of the organisation Ni Putes Ni Soumises, stated that: "The veil is the visible symbol of the subjugation of women, and therefore has no place in the mixed, secular spaces of France's public school system." Another francophone Muslim influential for his work on public welfare, Hedi Mhenni, shares the view of these Islamic feminists and similarly expressed support for Tunisia's ban on the veil in public workplaces in those terms: "If today we accept the headscarf, tomorrow we'll accept that women's rights to work and vote and receive an education be banned and they'll be seen as just a tool for reproduction and housework."

==== Secularism arguments ====
Certain individuals and associations consider the scarf to be a symbol of belonging to the Muslim community. According to this line of reasoning, women who wear the veil display their religious and community affiliation, which harms the unity and secularism of the French Republic. The position of the French government is that secularism in schools is incompatible with wearing ostentatious religious articles, whatever they be. However, in December 2003, President Chirac extended this policy for all public secondary education establishments, risking fanning the tensions between communities within the multicultural French society. France is home to both the largest Jewish and Muslim minorities in Western Europe.

==== Educators ====
In the mid-2000s, a majority of French educators opposed the veil in general, and particularly in classes.

==== General public ====
The majority of French people, according to a survey conducted in the last four months of 2003, responded that they would be in favor of a law forbidding the veil in schools.

In 2013, 86% of respondents in a poll for i-Télé were in favour of a ban for headscarfs and other religious and political symbols in both public and private institutions for children. The poll was made after the Court of Cassation ruled that a private crèche did not have the right to fire a woman who wore an Islamic headscarf.

=== Motivations of French people who do not oppose the hijab ===
According to the same surveys, more than 30% (about 10% of the population of France is Muslim) of the French do not want a law forbidding the veil in schools. Many individuals and organizations have been opposed to the idea of a law forbidding the veil since it was first proposed.

The collective "Les Blédardes" sees the controversy over the veil as a manifestation of colonialist sentiments. In 2003, they demand: "Give the veiled girls back their status as students – democracy and the State of justice will come out of this more mature, just as they matured through the rehabilitation of the Dreyfus Affair." Furthermore, some Islamic feminists have expressed offense at double standards implicit in some (non-Muslim) feminist arguments. Thus, when some feminists began defending the headscarf on the grounds of "tradition", Fadela Amara countered: "It's not tradition, it's archaic! French feminists are totally contradictory. When Algerian women fought against wearing the headscarf in Algeria, French feminists supported them. But when it's some young girl in a French suburb school, they don't. They define liberty and equality according to what colour your skin is. It's nothing more than neocolonialism."

Some would argue that the government attempting to protect Muslim women from the supposed repressiveness of the hijab is a form of paternalism. The banning of the hijab can be viewed as just another way of controlling how women dress by a patriarchal society.

A third interpretation of the principle of secularity based on its original formulation recalls that, according to the law, "all are equal to show and express their religious opinions in public as well as in private", and that the French state has the responsibility to guarantee access to free, public education to all Frenchmen.

Another argument is that making it illegal sends a message that hate crimes may be more tolerable.

An obvious concern that arises is what would qualify as an offensive scarf. The Islamic requirement for a 'Hijab' is to cover the hair and neck in combination to not wearing tight fitting clothing. As such, Muslim women could wear a combination of a hat and scarf which would qualify as a 'Hijab' but would not be obviously religious.

== 2004 French headscarf ban ==
In July 2003, President Jacques Chirac appointed a commission to examine the interaction between secularism and religious symbols in schools. The Commission released its report in December, endorsing a law that would ban "ostentatious" religious symbols, including the Islamic veil, the Jewish kippa, and large Christian crosses. Chirac adopted these findings "in the spirit of secularism", and the law, sometimes referred to as "the veil law", was voted in by the French parliament in March 2004. The law permits discreet signs of faith, such as small crosses, Stars of David, and the palm-shaped amulets representing a hand of Fatima.

=== Application in education ===
In many cases, the exact extent of possible application of the law is hard to ascertain, and has led to further complications: For example, is the law applicable to something other than the Islamic veil which covers the hair, such as a bandana, which does not outwardly indicate religious affiliation? Eventually, the case was settled in court (see below).

Would veiled parents be able to enter their children's schools? Former education minister François Fillon has stated that the law does not apply whatsoever to the parents of students. The Mediator of the Republic has agreed with this stance. However, in some cities, such as Montreuil, Seine-Saint-Denis, where integration of large numbers of Muslims is an acute problem, veiled parents are frequently denied entry. In May 2005, the mother of a student was denied permission to run a stand at her son's school festival. After much publicity, the interdiction was lifted. On 14 May 2007, the High authority for the struggle against discrimination and for equality (HALDE) affirmed that veiled parents should be allowed to attend school activities.

While the law forbidding the veil applies to students attending publicly funded primary schools and high schools, it does not refer to universities. Applicable legislation grants them freedom of expression as long as public order is preserved. However, veiled students are sometimes denied attendance.

In 2019, controversy surrounding the law erupted when a Muslim woman chaperoning her son's school field trip was told to remove her veil, sparking a debate regarding the right of private citizens to wear the scarf while taking part in school activities. Far Right politicians pushed for a ban on the scarf in such situations, citing the fact that students had to adhere to a ban on all religious head-coverings, and thus mothers should abide by the same rules. French Prime Minister Édouard Philippe defended the right of mothers to wear the hijab, claiming that secularism meant defending the religious freedoms of the people. However, French Education Minister Jean-Michel Blanquer, despite acknowledging the right of women to wear as they pleased, expressed his wish that mothers would not wear the hijab on school trips. Others from Emmanuel Macron's centrist party also expressed some support for a ban on the hijab on school trips. Others within the party expressed their opposition to those sentiments. Public personalities also came out against the statements. In an open letter, 90 public personalities signed an open letter calling on Macron to come out in support of Muslim mothers wearing the hijab on school trips.

=== Application in other situations ===
In public hospitals, employees are expected to respect the principle of secularism. In nursing schools, interviews are an official requirement for entry, during which applicants may be asked if they are willing to remove their veil either altogether or for the purpose of wearing a disposable cap, such as those worn in operating rooms.

As far as patients are concerned, the rule is to respect religious preferences.

=== Legal challenges ===
Some later court decisions have clarified issues that remained open. These decisions were issued by the highest French administrative court, the Conseil d'Etat, and by the European Court of Human Rights.

The Conseil d'État affirmed on 5 December 2007 that the ban also apply to clothing elements that were not inherently religious, but had a religious affiliation because of the behaviour of the student. Through this holding, the court upheld expulsions of students wearing a Sikh Keski and a bandana.

On 4 December 2008, the European Court of Human Rights (ECHR) affirmed the legality of the ban. Although the cases dated prior to the 2004 law, the Court rationale was consistent with the law: the ECHR held that the national authorities were obliged to take great care to ensure that (...) the manifestation by pupils of their religious beliefs on school premises did not take on the nature of an ostentatious act that would constitute a source of pressure and exclusion.

In 2012, UN Human Rights Committee has found a violation of ICCPR in case of expulsion of a Sikh from a school based on the 2004 law.

== Controversies over legal prohibition ==
On 12 August 2016, the mayor of Cannes in southern France banned full-body swimsuits, also called "burkinis", from the beach, arguing that it was considered a symbol of Islamic extremism and might spark tensions. Shortly after, on a Nice beach, four armed police officers forced a Muslim woman to take off her burkini. A photo of the incident spread quickly and led to criticism of the ban. The woman was fined 38 euro for wearing the burkini, and four other women were fined 38 euros for wearing their burkinis on the beach in Cannes.

On 25 August 2016, the Human Rights League and anti-Islamophobia groups described the ban as a dangerous and illegal threat on basic freedoms, particularly freedom of belief and religion. The UN, Spain, Italy, Germany, and Canada have criticised and ruled out France's ban on the burkini, claiming it is a very clear violation of human rights, and it does not respect Muslim women's dignity or modesty.

At least two other cities in France followed with similar bans, and one of these laws was appealed to the Conseil d’Etat, who overturned the bans. Immediately after, the burkini ban in Cannes was overturned by a court in Nice.

=== Alma and Lila Lévy ===
Alma and Lila Lévy are sisters who rose to fame at the centre of the French controversy over the veil in 2003 when they were expelled from school.

The controversial expulsion of the Lévy sisters from Lycée Henri-Wallon, in the suburb of Aubervilliers of Paris, ignited an international debate. The Lévy sisters were expelled for wearing the hijab. The girls' father, Laurent Lévy, a Jewish French lawyer, was quick to point out the antisemitic furore regarding the media's focus on his ethnicity, "I am Jewish by Vichy rules." In an interview with the BBC, he explained that his ex-wife, his daughters' mother, is a Muslim from Kabyle, Algeria. The sisters wrote a book about their experience.

=== Athletics ===
Although FIFA allows women to play in hijab, the French Football Federation has banned women from wearing hijab in competitive matches. In 2022, the French Senate passed a law that would have codified this ban, although it failed in the National Assembly. Les Hijabeuses, a collective of Muslim soccer players, protested the bill and are now challenging the FFF ban. France prohibited female athletes from wearing hijabs during the 2024 Summer Olympics.

== Practical consequences ==
The veil controversy and its legislative consequences have revealed problems associated with the practice of the Islamic faith insofar as religion in French society and institutions (as opposed to the problems of integration of individuals). Partially fueled by the fear of a "communitarization" or "Islamization" of French society, the controversy has also fed off fears in certain sections of the Muslim community in France of "forced assimilation" and a slippery slope that would seek to ban more and more expressions of the Muslim faith. The controversy has also, however, brought the issue of the place of Islam in French society to the forefront of debate.

The veil controversy has been used opportunely to promote the expression of a French form of Islam, distinct from the Islam in the French Muslims' countries of origin. The presence of Muslim Frenchwomen wearing tricolour veils and shouting, "I am French!" in protests in Paris against the law forbidding the veil is one example thereof. A survey conducted by the French polling organization CSA in September 2006 revealed that 91% of French Muslims claim to subscribe to culturally French principles such as the importance of the Republic and equal rights among men and women The figure falls to 73% for respondents who believe in the separation of church and state. In contrast, a majority (50–60%) of those surveyed responded unfavorably to the law of laïcité, and would prefer to see their wife or daughter free to wear the veil.

In 2004, a year after the law was voted in, one organization opposed to it, called the "Committee of the 15th of March and Liberty", published a report on the law's effects. The report cites the files of 806 students affected by the law. Of the 806 students, 533 have accepted the law and no longer wear their veils in class. The report also gives an assessment of students who have left the French school system because of this issue. Among them, 67 have pursued their studies abroad. Another 73 of those 806 suspended or expelled from schools over the veil have chosen to take government-run CNED correspondence courses in order to finish their studies. The number of those who have chosen to study via other, non-government forms of correspondence schools is unknown.

The opening of the 2005 school year passed largely without incident, and opposition to the law seems to have given way to broader public opinion. However, the actual number of those who no longer attend French junior high and high schools over their veils is unknown.

== Banning of full face covering in public ==
In 2010, a public debate arose and France passed a law that bans the wearing of full-face covering, including but not limited to burqas and niqābs, in public. The law was constitutionally cleared so that it came into force in April 2011. That debate and ban are separate from the above-discussed debate on the hijab in public schools, in that the new law does not pertain to Islamic scarves but rather to the much rarer full-face versions, as well as other full-face coverings (such as masks and balaclavas), and in that the new law applies to all citizens in public spaces regardless of religion or claimed tradition (and regardless of gender).

== See also ==
- Anti-mask laws
- British debate over veils
- French ban on face covering
- French law on secularity and conspicuous religious symbols in schools
- Ni Putes Ni Soumises
- Islamic dress in Europe
