= Les Hijabeuses =

French football advocacy group

Les Hijabeuses is a French collective which advocates for the rights of Muslim women to wear hijab while playing association football. The group was founded in May 2020 rising to prominence because of their opposition to legislation which would have codified a ban on wearing hijab while playing organized sports.

== History ==
Les Hijabeuses was founded in 2020 in response to the French Football Federation (FFF) ban on wearing hijab during competitive football games. Some members of the collective, which is composed primarily of young Muslim women, had been forced to give up their competitive football careers or faced other opposition when playing because of the FFF ban. Players argued the ban conflicted with FIFA rules which have allowed women to play in hijab since 2014. The collective campaigned against the ban and organized a protest at FFF headquarters in July 2021.

In January 2022, the Senate voted on and passed a conservative amendment that banned "ostensible religious symbols" in competitive sports, effectively codifying the FFF ban. Legislators supporting the amendment claimed that hijabs were tied to radical Islam and the ban was required to maintain secular neutrality. Les Hijabeuses argued that this neutrality conflicted with their freedom to worship. Les Hijabeuses began lobbying against the amendment attracting public attention, including a letter of support signed by Eric Cantona, Lilian Thuram, and others. The amendment was withdrawn when it became clear it would not pass the National Assembly, which is controlled by President Macron's En Marche! (LREM) party.

The group's protests have caused controversy within the French government and LREM, as laïcité (secularism) remains a divisive topic. Élisabeth Moreno, France's gender equality minister, spoke out in favor of the group saying that French law did not prohibit playing sports while wearing hijab. Afterwards Gabriel Attal, the spokesperson for President Macron's government, said that Moreno's statements did not reflect the official position of the government. Two other ministers (Bruno Le Maire and Marlène Schiappa) came out in favor of the amendment.

After the Senate amendment was removed, Les Hijabeuses challenged the FFF's rule in front of the Conseil d'État. On 29 June 2023, the Conseil upheld the ban on playing in hijab.

== See also ==
- Sports hijab
- Muslim women in sport
