= Stasi Commission =

The French commission Stasi is a commission set up to reflect upon the application of the laïcité principle. Named after the chair Bernard Stasi, ombudsman of the (French) Republic (médiateur de la République) since 1998, and consisting of 20 members, it was set up by the President Jacques Chirac on 3 July 2003. It reported its conclusions on 11 December 2003. The Report denounces "Islamism" as deeply opposed to the mainstream interpretations of French culture. It is portrayed as a dangerous political agenda that will create a major obstacle for Muslims to comply with French secularism or "laïcité ".

== Overview ==
Jacques Chirac established the commission to reflect upon the principle of laïcité and its application in France. He appointed Bernard Stasi to oversee the commission. During this time, the commission interviewed various representatives from different groups, for example religious leaders such as Cardinal Lustiger, intellectuals such as Régis Debray and Patrick Weil as well school headteachers, political leaders, equal-rights groups and social groups (for example the Ni Putes Ni Soumises).

The commission emerged from public debates concerning the place of the hijab in French public life in relation to the principles of laïcité, in particular whether it was appropriate in state schools. In addition the commission sought to more clearly define the application of laïcité in the workplace, public services and public spaces. To this end the Stasi Commission lead to the introduction of the French law on secularity and conspicuous religious symbols in schools. Despite this apparent resolution to the questions concerning laïcité, the controversy surrounding the wearing of the hijab and the media attention paid to it has meant that it remains a source of disagreement within the political class.

In response to the commission's report Jacques Chirac called for the French public to unite around the principle of laïcité.

== Principles ==
The report espouses two key stances that emerge from the history of secularism in France: state neutrality in regard to religion and freedom of thought particularly in relation to freedom of worship. The report also acknowledges that tensions arise between these two principles particularly in the spheres of the army, prisons, hospitals and education.

The Commission also called for the incorporation of 'accomodements raisonables' or reasonable accommodation into the principles of laïcité for problems that are not covered by the 1905 French law on the Separation of the Churches and the State.
