= Hassen Chalghoumi =

French imam (born 1972)

Imam Hassen Chalghoumi
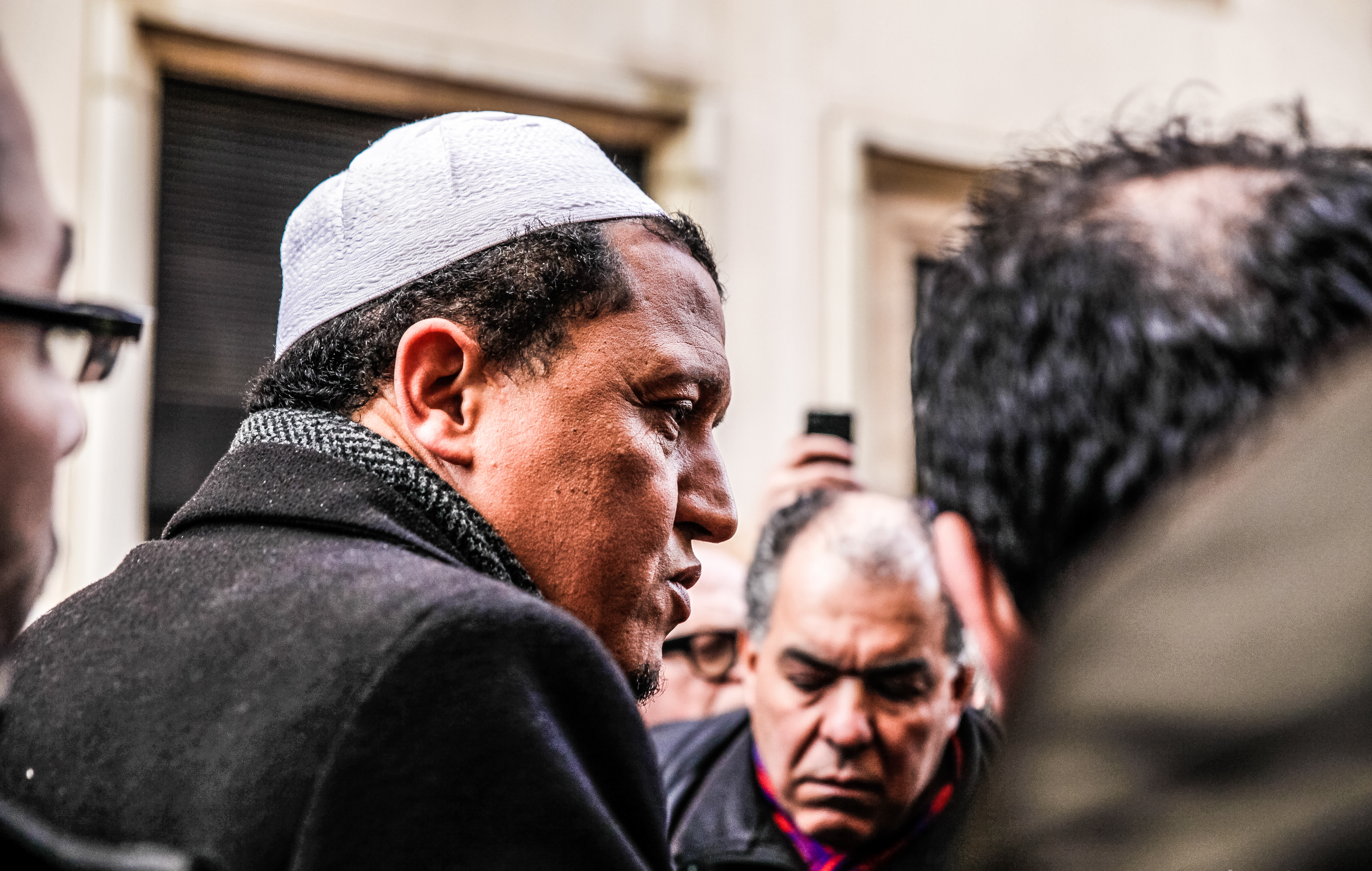
- Hassen Chalghoumi, Rue Nicolas-Appert, Paris, one day after the Charlie Hebdo shooting.
- Born: 1972 (age 52–53); Tunis
- Employer(s): Drancy mosque in Seine-Saint-Denis, France

Hassen Chalghoumi is the imam of the municipal Drancy mosque in Seine-Saint-Denis, near Paris.

He stood out during the Islamic scarf controversy in France for supporting French President Nicolas Sarkozy's draft law to ban the burqa. He has good relations with Jewish organisations in France, which sometimes caused demonstrations and clashes in Drancy mosque.

He studied in Syria and Pakistan in madrasa before coming to France in 1996. He was a member of the Tablighi Jamaat (with whom he remains close) until 2005. He was naturalised as a French citizen in 2005. In 2009, he founded the "Conference of Imams", an organisation whose aim is to publish "fatwas" for Muslims living in France.

Some of his opponents call him "Imam of the Jews" for his activism with the French Jewish organisation CRIF. At the beginning of 2009 he was invited to the Elysée and the Conseil Représentatif des Institutions juives de France (CRIF), a French Jewish organisation. In 2006, he made a speech in front of the deportation memorial in Drancy. His house was vandalized a few days later, although no link has been established between these two events.

In an interview in the Le Parisien he voiced the opinion that no man should refuse to allow his wife to be examined by a male doctor.

Chalghoumi has questioned Western support for the Arab Spring, due to the growing support in certain states for Islamist political parties. He feels that Ben Ali, second President of Tunisia, saved the country from the Algerian Civil War.

He is married and has five children.
