= Bernard Stasi =

French politician (1930–2011)

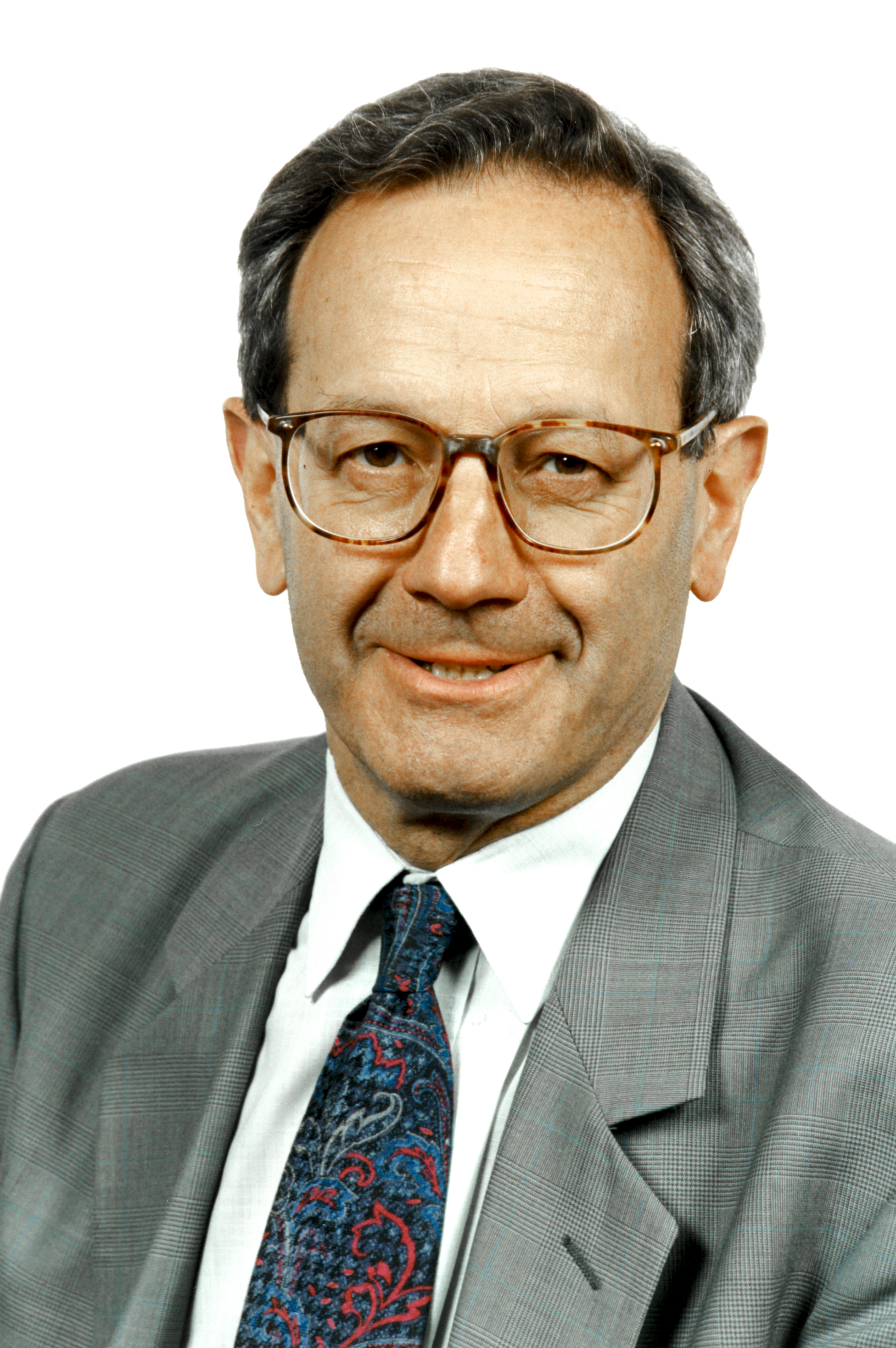
- Portrait as a Member of the European Parliament, 1994

Mediator of the French Republic
- In office 1998–2004
- President: Jacques Chirac
- Preceded by: Jacques Pelletier
- Succeeded by: Jean-Paul Delevoye

Personal details
- Born: 4 July 1930 Reims, France
- Died: 4 May 2011 (aged 80) 18th arrondissement of Paris, France
- Party: UDF
- Education: ÉNA
- Profession: Civil servant

Bernard Stasi (4 July 1930 – 4 May 2011) was a French politician. He was the son of Italo-Mexican immigrants. Stasi served as Minister for Overseas Departments and Territories from 2 April 1973 to 27 February 1974.

From 1998 to 2004 he was the Ombudsman of the French Republic.

== Biography ==
Bernard Stasi's grandparents and relatives are born in different countries: his paternal family in Italy, his father in Barcelona, Spain and his mother in Cuba. He obtained French citizenship at age 18. He is the brother of Mario Stasi, former bâtonnier of Paris.

== Administrative and political career ==
A graduate of the École nationale d'administration (ENA) in 1959, he was first appointed chief of staff of the prefect of Algiers. He then advised firms in different management capacities from 1963 to 1968 before becoming MP of the Marne from 1968 to 1973 and from 1974 to 1993 under the Centre of Social Democrats (which became part of Union for French Democracy (UDF). He also served as a minister several times. He was Vice-President of the French National Assembly from 1978 to 1983, President of the Champagne-Ardenne region from 1981 to 1988, member of the European Parliament from 1994 to 1998 and mayor of Épernay from 1970 to 1977 and from 1983 to 2000. In September 1981, following Jacques Chirac and Jacques Toubon he voted with the majority parliamentarian of the left for the abolition of the death penalty, presented by Robert Badinter, and expressed regret that such a measure was enacted by his predecessor. But in the debate on cohabitation that agitated the right between 1984 and March 1986 he sided with Raymond Barre, believing that a general election was - with the 1969 referendum that ended the political career of Général de Gaulle - valued as a test for or against the legitimacy of the President of France.

He lost his deputy seat in 1993, resulting from his position on the Evin Act on alcohol advertisements (his region is a full wine region). He forced the annulment of the election, but was defeated in the election again in 1994.

From 5 April 1973 to 12 February 1974, he was Minister of Overseas France under Pierre Messmer. He condemned the 1973 Chilean coup d'état on 11 September 1973.

During the Bosnian Genocide (1992–1995), he was one of the very few French personalities to denounce it.

From 1998 to 2004, he held the office of Médiateur de la République (Ombudsman), under which he chaired the Stasi commission to report on secularism in France.

He was a member of the sponsorship committee of the French Coalition for nonviolence and Peace.

He died 4 May 2011, at the age of 80 years at the Bretonneau Hospital.

== Controversy over his foreign origin ==
6 February 1986, during a debate with Jean-Marie Le Pen on France Inter (French public radio), Stasi started "I do not have the same beliefs as you," to which Le Pen replied, "That is normal, because you are an immigrant son and you have only been French since you were eighteen." Stasi immediately replied, "You have the nerve to tell me that as a foreign son I would not have the right to engage in politics?" Le Pen concludes, "I think it's a matter of good taste." After the fall of the Berlin Wall, Jean-Marie Le Pen renewed his claim: "When one is named Stasi, one does as the Communist Party, one changes ones name."

But his strong support for immigration expressed in his book L'immigration, une chance pour la France (Immigration, an opportunity for France), also resulted in insults from his own party. He also adopted nonconformist positions on the crisis in November 1984 in New Caledonia, saying in a report that the origins of the Kanak crisis predated the 1981. Christian Bonnet called him "Stasibaou" (alluding to the Kanak leader Jean-Marie Tjibaou). This double hostility contributed to his parliamentary defeat in September 1986, during his candidacy for President of the Foreign Affairs Committee of the National Assembly against Roland Dumas, for the fall session of the year 1986. Members of the National Front and a member of the right-wing majority voted for Roland Dumas, who accepted all votes without qualms. It was also fair, as he says, to count only the votes of the National Front. Roland Dumas prevailed because of, as was the law, his greater age. Subsequent sessions of the spring and fall of 1987, Valéry Giscard d'Estaing maintained cohesion within the majority for the candidacy, while he solicited, by open letter, the votes of the National Front.

== Details of offices held ==
=== Local offices ===
1970–1977: Mayor of Épernay
1983–2000: Mayor of Épernay
1981–1988: President of the Regional Council of Champagne-Ardenne

=== Parliamentary offices ===
11 July 1968 – 6 May 1973: Member of the fourth district of the Marne (resigned in favor of a government office)
3 April 1978 – 1 April 1986: Member of the fourth district of the Marne
2 April 1986 – 14 May 1988: Member of the Marne (elected by proportional representation)
23 June 1988 – 1 April 1993: Member of the Sixth District of the Marne
19 July 1994 – 24 April 1998: MEP

== See also ==
- Government of France
