= Secularism in France =

French constitutional principle of state secularism

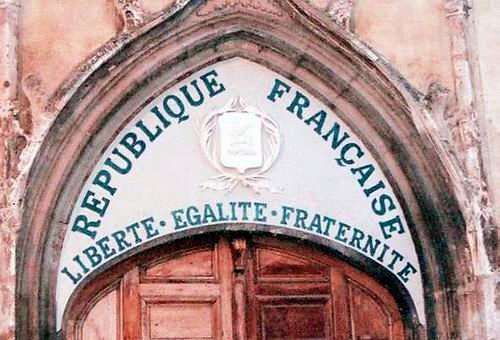
Motto of the French Republic on the tympanum of The Collegiate Church of Saint Pancras in Aups commune, Var department, which was installed after the 1905 law on the Separation of the Churches and the State. Such inscriptions on a church are very rare; this one was restored during the 1989 bicentennial of the French Revolution.

Laïcité ([la.i.si.te]; 'secularism') is the constitutional principle of secularism in France. Article 1 of the French Constitution is commonly interpreted as the separation of civil society and religious society. It discourages religious involvement in government affairs, especially in the determination of state policies as well as the recognition of a state religion. It also forbids government involvement in religious affairs, and especially prohibits government influence in the determination of religion, such that it includes a right to the free exercise of religion.

French secularism has a long history: Enlightenment thinkers emphasized reason and self direction. Revolutionaries in 1789 violently overthrew the Ancien Régime, which included the Catholic Church. Secularism was an important ideology during the Second Empire and Third Republic. For the last century, the French government policy has been based on the 1905 French law on the Separation of the Churches and the State, which is however not applicable in Alsace and Moselle. While the term laïcité has been used from the end of the 19th century to denote the freedom of public institutions from the influence of the Catholic Church, the concept today covers other religious movements as well.

== Concept ==
Laïcité relies on the division between private life, where adherents believe religion belongs, and the public sphere, in which each individual should appear as a simple citizen who is equal to all other citizens, not putting the emphasis on any ethnic, religious, or other particularities. According to this concept, the government must refrain from taking positions on religious doctrine and consider religious subjects only for their practical consequences on inhabitants' lives.

It is best described as a belief that government and political issues should be kept separate from religious organizations and religious issues (as long as the latter do not have notable social consequences). This is meant to both protect the government from any possible interference from religious organizations and to protect the religious organization from political quarrels and controversies.

Proponents argue that laïcité itself does not necessarily imply any hostility of the government with respect to any religion, asserting that French state secularism is actually based upon respect for freedom of thought and freedom of religion. Therefore, the absence of a state religion—and the subsequent separation of the state and church—is considered by proponents to be a prerequisite for such freedoms.

== History ==
The French word laïc comes from Latin lāicus, which is a loanword from the Greek lāïkós (λᾱϊκός, 'of the people'), itself from lāós (λᾱός, 'people'). (Note: While the term was first used with this meaning in 1871 in the dispute over the removal of religious teachers and instruction from primary schools, the word laïcisme dates to 1842.) The French suffix -ité is equivalent to the English -ity. Secularism is a concept rooted in the French Revolution, beginning to develop since the French Third Republic after the Republicans gained control of the state.

While the term laity originally meant everyone who is not clergy, after the Revolution it came to denote separation of religion from all branches of government, prohibiting the establishment of a state religion and endorsing government neutrality with respect to religion and atheism.

From the end of the 19th century, the word laïcité has been synonymous with secularization—among countries where the Catholic Church had retained its influence—meaning the freedom of public institutions (especially primary schools) from the influence of the Church. Today, the concept covers other religious movements as well. Secularism took form for the first time during the French Revolution: the abolition of the Ancien Régime in August 1789 was accompanied by the end of religious privileges and the affirmation of universal principles, including the freedom of opinion and equal rights expressed by the 1789 Declaration of Rights of Man and Citizen. The text of the Declaration of Rights of Man and Citizen was incorporated into the preamble to the Constitution of October 4, 1958. This includes article 10 of the declaration: "No one should be harassed over his opinions, even religious, provided that their manifestation does not disturb the public order established by law."

Public education has been secular since the laws of March 28, 1882, and October 30, 1886, which established "moral and civic instruction" in place of teaching religious morals and secularism of personnel and programs, respectively.

In the 19th century, secularization laws gradually separated the state from historical ties with the Catholic Church and created new sociopolitical values constructed on the principles of republican universalism. This process, which took place in a larger movement linked to modernity, entrusted the French people with redefining the political and social foundations: the executive, legislative and judicial powers; the organization of the state, its components, its representations; the education system, the rites of civil life, and the development of law and morality; regardless of religious beliefs. The Third Republic notably recreated the organization of the school system, by establishing public, secular, and compulsory education (Jules Ferry laws). The Jules Ferry laws (1881–1882) are supplemented by the Goblet law (established in 1886) on the organization of primary education, article 17 of which provides that education in public schools is exclusively entrusted to secular staff. This process culminated in 1905 with the Law of Separation of Churches and State, which solidified secularization.

=== 1905 law and the Constitution of 1946–1958 ===
Although the term was current throughout the 19th century, France did not fully separate church and state until the passage of its 1905 law on the separation of the Churches and the State, prohibiting the state from recognizing or funding any religion.

However, the 1905 law did not use the word laïcité itself, and so the notion of laïcité as a legal principle is open to question, as it was never defined as such by the text of a law. It was not until the Constitution of 1946 from the French Fourth Republic that the word appeared explicitly as a constitutional principle entailing legal effect, but without being further specified. If built before 1905 religious buildings in France (mostly Catholic churches, Protestant chapels, and Jewish synagogues) became the property of the city councils. Those now have the duty to maintain the (often historical) buildings but cannot subsidize the religious organizations using them. In areas that were part of Germany at that time, and which did not return to France until 1918, some arrangements for the cooperation of church and state are still in effect today (see Alsace-Moselle).

=== Constitution of 1958–present ===
Secularism is a core concept in the French Constitution: Article 1 formally states that:

French	English
La France est une République indivisible, laïque, démocratique et sociale. Elle assure l’égalité devant la loi de tous les citoyens sans distinction d’origine, de race ou de religion. Elle respecte toutes les croyances.	France shall be an indivisible, secular, democratic and social Republic. It shall ensure the equality of all citizens before the law, without distinction of origin, race or religion. It shall respect all beliefs.

=== Current status and debate ===
The principle of laïcité in France is implemented through a number of policies, primarily based on the 1905 law. The French government is legally prohibited from recognizing any religion (except for legacy statutes like those of military chaplains and the local law of Alsace-Moselle). Instead, it recognizes religious organizations, according to formal legal criteria that do not address religious doctrine:

- whether the sole purpose of the organization is to organize religious activities (so that, for instance, the pretense of being a religious organization is not used for tax evasion)
- whether the organization disrupts public order.

French political leaders, though not by any means prohibited from making religious remarks, mostly refrain from it. Religious considerations are generally considered incompatible with reasoned political debate. Political leaders are not allowed to practice any religion and are expected to differentiate whatever religious beliefs from their political arguments. Christine Boutin, who openly argued on religious grounds against a legal domestic partnership available regardless of the sex of the partners, quickly became the butt of late-night comedy jokes.

Many find that being discreet with one's religion is a necessary part of being French, which has led to frequent divisions with some non-Christian immigrants, especially with part of France's large Muslim population. As such, the debate has taken place over whether any religious apparel or displays by individuals (e.g., the Islamic hijab, Sikh turban, Christian crosses, and Jewish Stars of David and kippah) should be banned from public schools. Such a ban in France came into effect in 2004. In the spring of 2011, the official non-discrimination agency, la HALDE, reinforced laïcité in hospitals—as advocated by the Minister of the Interior, Claude Guéant—and in public service generally.

The strict separation of church and state which began with the 1905 law has evolved into what some religious leaders see as a "form of political correctness that made bringing religion into public affairs a major taboo." Former President Nicolas Sarkozy initially criticized this approach as a "negative laïcité" and wanted to develop a "positive laïcité" that recognizes the contribution of faith to French culture, history, and society, allows for faith in the public discourse, and enables government subsidies for faith-based groups. Sarkozy saw France's main religions as positive contributions to French society. He visited the pope in December 2007 and publicly acknowledged France's Christian roots, while highlighting the importance of freedom of thought, arguing that faith should come back into the public sphere. On 12 September 2008, in line with Sarkozy's views on the need for reform of laïcité, Pope Benedict XVI said that it was time to revisit the debate over the relationship between church and state, advocating a "healthy" form of laïcité. Meeting with Sarkozy, he stated:

In fact, it is fundamental, on the one hand, to insist upon the distinction between the political realm and that of religion in order to preserve both the religious freedom of citizens and the responsibility of the state toward them. [...] On the other hand, [it is important] to become more aware of the irreplaceable role of religion for the formation of consciences and the contribution which it can bring to – among other things – the creation of a basic ethical consensus within society.

In 2009, Sarkozy changed footing on the place of religion in French society, as he publicly declared the burqa as "not welcome" in France, and favoring legislation to outlaw it. In February 2010, two people in burqas managed to pass the security doors of a post office in their full veils, after which the two removed their head coverings, pulled out a gun, and held up the post office. Following March 2011, local elections strong disagreement appeared within the governing UMP over the appropriateness of holding a debate on laïcité as desired by the French President. On 30 March 2011, a letter appeared in La Croix signed by representatives of 6 religious bodies opposing the appropriateness of such a debate.

A law was passed on 2011 April 11 with strong support from political parties, as well as from Sarkozy, which made it illegal to hide the face in public spaces, affecting a few thousand women in France wearing the niqab and the burqa.

Scholar Olivier Roy has argued that the burkini bans (2016) and secularist policies of France provoked religious violence in France, to which Gilles Kepel responded that Britain, which has no such policies, still suffered a greater number of attacks in 2017 than France.

Lebanese-born French author Amin Maalouf has criticized the characterization of France's political structure as truly secular, remarking: "I have never understand how a country that called herself secular could call some of her citizens 'French Muslims', and deprive them of some of their rights merely because they belonged to a religion other than her own."

In an ethnographic study of Catholicism in contemporary Paris, the anthropologist Elayne Oliphant argued that although laïcité is often described as creating a space free from the presence of religion, Catholic objects, images and spaces continue to pervade the Parisian landscape in ways that pass unremarked, a condition she terms the "privilege" of Catholicism's banality: Catholic materiality occupies the public sphere as ostensibly neutral culture while signs of Islam are marked and regulated as religious. Whether this condition is better understood as "catholaïcité" or as a secularized Catholicism, she notes, remains debated.

== Influence on other countries ==
Other countries have followed in the French model, having forms of secularism—examples include Albania, Mexico, and Turkey.

=== Quebec (Canada) ===
Public discourse in Quebec, the only predominantly French-speaking province in Canada, has been greatly influenced by the secularism of France since the 1960s. Prior to this time, Quebec was seen as a very observant Catholic society, where Catholicism was a de facto state religion. Quebec then underwent a period of rapid secularization called the Quiet Revolution. Quebec politicians have tended to adopt a more French-style understanding of secularism rather than the rest of Canada which is similar to the United Kingdom. This came to the fore during the debate on what constitutes the "reasonable accommodation" of religious minorities.

In September 2013, the government of Quebec proposed Bill 60, the "Charter affirming the values of State secularism and religious neutrality and of equality between women and men, and providing a framework for accommodation requests." The bill would alter the provincial human rights law to prohibit public employees from wearing objects that overtly indicate a religious preference. The people who would be most impacted by such a law would be Muslim women wearing a hijab, Jewish men wearing a kippah, and Sikh men (or women) wearing a turban. Employees who do not comply with the law would be terminated from their employment. The party that had proposed the bill, the Parti Québécois, was defeated in the 2014 election by the Quebec Liberal Party (who gained a majority of seats), which opposed the bill. As a result, the bill is considered 'dead'.

In 2019, Premier François Legault's CAQ government passed Bill 21, a secularism law banning public officials in positions of coercive power from wearing or displaying any religious symbols. However, the display of religious symbols affixed in public institutions like hospitals will be left for each administration thereof to decide. To counter charges of hypocrisy, the Crucifix in the Quebec National Assembly was also removed.

=== Mexico ===
French laïcité influenced the Constitution of Mexico despite the Catholic Church maintaining strong influence. In March 2010, the Chamber of Deputies introduced legislation to amend the Constitution to make the Mexican government formally laico—meaning 'lay' or 'secular'. Critics of the move say the "context surrounding the amendment suggests that it might be a step backward for religious liberty and true separation of church and state".

Coming on the heels of the Church's vocal objection to legalization of abortion as well as same-sex unions and adoptions in Mexico City, "together with some statements of its supporters, suggests that it might be an attempt to suppress the Catholic Church's ability to engage in public policy debates." Mexico has had a history of religious suppression and persecution. Critics of the amendment reject the idea that "Utilitarians, Nihilists, Capitalists, and Socialists can all bring their philosophy to bear on public life, but Catholics (or religious minorities) must check their religion at the door" in a sort of "second-class citizenship" which they consider nothing more than religious discrimination.

=== Turkey ===
In Turkey, a strong stance of secularism (Turkish: laiklik) has held sway since Mustafa Kemal Atatürk's Turkish revolution in the early 20th century. On March 3, 1924, Turkey removed the caliphate system and gradually after that, all religious influence from the state. Sunni Islam, the majority religion, is now controlled by the Turkish government through the Department of Religious Affairs, and is state-funded while other religions or sects have independence on religious affairs. Islamic views that are deemed political are censored in accordance with the principle of secularism.

This system of Turkish laïcité permeates both the government and the religious sphere. The content of the weekly sermons in all state-funded mosques has to be approved by the state. Independent Sunni communities are also illegal. Minority religions, like Armenian or Greek Orthodoxy, are guaranteed by the constitution as individual faiths and are mostly tolerated, but this guarantee does not give any rights to any religious communities including Muslim ones. Turkey's view is that the Treaty of Lausanne gives certain religious rights to Jews, Greeks, and Armenians but not, for example, to Syrian-Orthodox or Roman Catholics, because the latter ones did not play any political roles during the treaty. However, the Treaty of Lausanne does not specify any nationality or ethnicity and simply identifies non-Muslims in general.

In 2009, the desire to reestablish the Greek Orthodox seminary on Heybeli Island near Istanbul became a political issue in regard to Turkey's accession to EU membership. The EU considers such prohibition to amount to suppression of religious freedom.

== Contrast with the United States ==
In the United States, the First Amendment to the Constitution contains a similar federal concept, although the term laicity is not used either in the Constitution or elsewhere and is sometimes used as a term to contrast European secularism with American secularism. That amendment includes clauses prohibiting both congressional governmental interference with the free exercise of religion and congressional laws regarding the establishment of religion. Originally this prevented the federal government from interfering with state-established religions. However, after the 14th amendment, these clauses have been held by the courts to apply to both the federal and state governments. Together, the "free exercise clause" and "establishment clause" are considered to accomplish a "separation of church and state."

Nonetheless, separation is not extended to bar religious conduct in public places or by public servants. Public servants, up to and including the President of the United States, often make proclamations of religious faith. Sessions of both houses of the United States Congress and most state legislatures typically open with a prayer by a minister of some faith or other, and many if not most politicians and senior public servants in Washington, DC, attend the annual Roman Catholic Red Mass at the Cathedral of St. Matthew the Apostle regardless of their personal religious convictions. In contrast to France, the wearing of religious insignia in public schools is largely noncontroversial as a matter of law and culture in the US; the main cases where there have been controversies are when the practice in question is potentially dangerous (for instance, the wearing of the Sikh kirpan knife in public places) and even then the issue is usually settled in favor of allowing the practice. In addition, the US government regards religious institutions as tax-exempt non-profit organizations, subject to limitations on their political involvement. In contrast to Europe, however, the government cannot display religious symbols (such as the cross) in public schools, courts, and other government offices, although some exceptions are made (e.g. recognition of a cultural group's religious holiday). The United States Supreme Court has also banned any activity in public schools and other government-run areas that can be viewed as a government endorsement of religion.

The French philosopher and Universal Declaration of Human Rights co-drafter Jacques Maritain, a devout Catholic convert and a critic of French laïcité, noted the distinction between the models found in France and in mid-20th century United States. He considered the US model of that time to be more amicable because it had both "sharp distinction and actual cooperation" between church and state (what he called "a historical treasure") and admonished the United States, "Please to God that you keep it carefully and do not let your concept of separation veer round to the European one."

== See also ==
- 1825 Anti-Sacrilege Act – French law against sacrilege
- Anti-clericalism – Opposition to clericalism
- Centre d'action laïque
- Civil religion – Manifestation of religious values inherent to nations
- Dechristianization of France during the French Revolution – Anti-Christian policy during the French Revolution
- Freemasonry and Catholicism
- French ban on face covering
- Islamic scarf controversy in France
- Quebec's secularism law – Statute of Quebec
- Politics of Turkey
- Secularism in Turkey
- Secular education – System of public education in countries with a secular government
- Secular humanism – Life stance that embraces human reason, secular ethics, and philosophical naturalism
- Secular state – State or country without a state religion
- Secularism – Position that religion should not influence civic and state affairs
  - Laicism – French public secularization movement
- Self-determination – Right to participate in one's own governance
