= Lycée Henri Wallon (Aubervilliers) =

Lycée Henri-Wallon

Information
- Type: Public high school

Lycée Henri Wallon is a senior high school/sixth-form college in Aubervilliers, Seine-Saint-Denis, France, in the Paris metropolitan area.

As of 2017, there are more than 2000+ students in Lyceé Collège Henri Wallon Aubervilliers.

There are more than 200+ professors in this Collège/Lycee.
