= List of LGBTQ rights activists =

This is a list of notable LGBTQ rights activists who have worked to advance LGBTQ rights through political change, legal action or publication. It is ordered by country, alphabetically.

== Albania ==
- Xheni Karaj, founder of Aleanca LGBT organization and recipient of the Civil Rights Defenders of the Year Award 2022
- Kristi Pinderi, LGBT activist and journalist; founder of Pro-LGBT
- Alba Ahmetaj, LGBT activist, and co-founder of ProLGBT
- Edlira Mara, LGBT activist and co-founder of ProLGTB

== Angola ==
- Carlos Fernandes, LGBT activist and a founder/director of the Iris Angola Association
- Imanni Da Silva, Angolan model and transgender rights activist
- Titica, transgender Angolan singer and goodwill ambassador for UNAIDS

== Argentina ==
- Mariana Alarcón, human rights activist who worked for labor rights for transgender women
- Claudia Pía Baudracco, led the movement to repeal laws criminalizing transgender identities. Co-founder of the Argentine Lesbian, Gay, Bisexual, and Trans Federation
- Lohana Berkins, founder of the Association for the Fight for Travesti and Transsexual Identity
- Lara María Bertolini, human rights activist advocating for the rights of travesti, transgender, and non-binary people
- Claudia Castrosín Verdú, she and her partner were the first lesbian couple to form a civil union in Latin America; vice president of FALGBT
- Carlos Jáuregui, gay activist.
- Roberto Jáuregui, gay activist, Carlos's brother.
- María Rachid, politician and LGBT rights activist, partner of Claudia Castrosín Verdú
- Diana Sacayán, board member of the International Lesbian, Gay, Bisexual, Trans and Intersex Association and a leader of the Antidiscrimination Liberation Movement
- Eugenio Talbot Wright, human rights and LGBTQ activist from Cordoba

== Armenia ==
- Lilit Martirosyan, trans right activist, founder of the Right Side NGO

== Australia ==
- Ron Austin
- Peter Bonsall-Boone
- Bob Brown
- Lyle Chan, member of ACT UP
- Rodney Croome
- Peter De Waal
- Alex Greenwich
- Grace Hyland
- Craig Johnston
- Michael Kirby, justice of the High Court of Australia
- Julie McCrossin
- Sally Rugg
- Magda Szubanski
- Derek Williams, co-founder of GaLTaS

== Austria ==
- Helmut Graupner, lawyer and LGBT activist
- Gery Keszler, organizer of the Life Ball
- Alex Jürgen
- Ulrike Lunacek
- Hermann von Teschenberg, barrister, translator, and LGBT rights activist

== Bangladesh ==
- Xulhaz Mannan

== Barbados ==
- Ro-Ann Mohammed, co-founder of the organization Barbados - Gays, Lesbians and All-Sexuals against Discrimination (B-GLAD)
- Donnya Piggott, tech entrepreneur, human rights advocate, co-founder of the organization Barbados - Gays, Lesbians and All-Sexuals against Discrimination (B-GLAD)

== Belgium ==
- Sonja Eggerickx, teacher, women and LGBT rights advocate
- Eliane Morissens, teacher and LGBT activist for labor rights

== Belize ==
- Derricia Castillo-Salazar
- Caleb Orozco

== Botswana ==
- Katlego Kai Kolanyane-Kesupile, performance artist, musician, writer and LGBT activist
- Monica Tabengwa, lawyer and researcher on LGBT rights issues in sub-Saharan Africa
- Caine Youngman, involved in court cases to legalize same-sex relationships

== Brazil ==
- Míriam Martinho
- Luiz Mott
- Toni Reis
- João Silvério Trevisan
- Jean Wyllys

== Bulgaria ==
- Desislava Petrova, LGBT activist, former president of Gemini
- Monika Pisankaneva, lecturer and activist; founder of Gemini

== Cameroon ==
- Bandy Kiki, blogger and LGBTQ activist
- Joel Gustave Nana Ngongang
- Alice Nkom, first woman lawyer in Cameroon and LGBTQ rights activist

== Canada ==
- Barry D. Adam (born 1952), sociologist, author, and HIV/AIDS prevention researcher
- Enza Anderson (born 1964), trans rights activist and journalist
- Florence Ashley, activist and academic who specializes in trans law and bioethics
- Chris Bearchell (1953–2007), gay liberation activist and right to privacy advocate
- Alec Butler (born 1959), filmmaker and playwright
- Michelle Douglas (born 1963), human rights activist who challenged military anti-LGBTQ discrimination policies
- Jim Egan (1921–2000), early LGBTQ rights activist known for his role in Egan v Canada
- Brent Hawkes (born 1950), gay rights activist and clergyman
- Alan Herbert (1944–2003), LGBTQ rights activist and one of Canada's first out gay politicians
- George Hislop (1927–2005), gay rights activist and one of Canada's first out gay politicians
- k.d. lang (born 1961), musician and LGBTQ rights activist
- John Alan Lee (1933–2013), sociologist and early LGBTQ rights activist
- Michael Lynch (1944–1991), gay liberationist and AIDS activist
- Irshad Manji (born 1968), educator, human rights activist, and advocate for LGBTQ Muslims' rights
- Tim McCaskell (born 1951), gay rights and AIDS activist
- Christin Milloy, LGBTQ activist and Canada's first out transgender provincial-level political candidate
- Arsham Parsi, activist and founder of the International Railroad for Queer Refugees
- Gordon Price (born 1949), urban planner, gay rights activist, and former politician
- Svend Robinson (born 1952), Canada's first MP to come out as gay while in office
- Bill Siksay (born 1955), first out gay non-incumbent man to be elected to Canada's House of Commons
- Clara Sorrenti (born 1994), Twitch streamer, political commentator, and trans rights activist
- Richard Summerbell (born 1956), scientist, author, and gay activist
- Jenna Talackova (born 1988), model who successfully waged a legal battle to be allowed to compete in the Miss Universe Canada
- Mark Tewksbury (born 1968), competitive swimmer who challenged homophobia in the sports world
- Kai Cheng Thom (born 1991), writer, performance artist, and activist
- Thomas Waugh (born 1948), academic, film critic, and activist

== Chile ==
- Luis Larraín
- Pedro Lemebel
- Jaime Parada
- Pablo Salvador
- Juan Pablo Sutherland

== China, People's Republic of ==
- Cui Zi'en
- Li Tingting, LGBT rights and feminist activist
- Li Yinhe
- Xian, LGBT rights activist and founder of Beijing-based lesbian organization Tongyu

== Colombia ==
- Virgilio Barco Isakson (b. 1965)
- Armando Benedetti Villaneda (b. 1962)
- Juliana Delgado Lopera
- Blanca Inés Durán Hernández
- Angélica Lozano Correa
- Tatiana de la Tierra

== Costa Rica ==
- Victor Madrigal-Borloz

== Croatia ==
- Franko Dota
- Merlinka
- Mima Simić, LGBTQ activist and Croatia's first openly out LGBTIQ+ political candidate

== Cuba ==
- Ada Bello, LGBTQ rights activist and medical researcher
- Mariela Castro, director of the National Commission for Comprehensive Attention to Transsexual People

== Denmark ==
- Axel and Eigil Axgil, Danish gay rights advocates
- Lili Elbe (b. 1882), Danish painter, transgender woman

== Ecuador ==
- Sandra Álvarez (born 1967), founder of the Ecuadorian Organization of Lesbian Women and the first openly LGBT person to hold an elected position in Ecuador's National Assembly
- Fernando Cerón (born 1989)
- Orlando Montoya, Colombian who led Ecuador's decriminalization of homosexuality
- Diane Rodríguez
- Carina Vance Mafla

== Egypt ==
- Shrouk El-Attar
- Sarah Hegazi
- Maher Sabry
- Omar Sharif Jr.

== El Salvador ==
- Ruby Corado, Salvadoran LGBTQ rights activist

== Estonia ==
- Lisette Kampus
- Peeter Rebane

== Fiji ==
- Miki Wali

== Finland ==
- Sakris Kupila
- Sofi Oksanen

== France ==
- Camille Cabral
- Pierre Guénin
- Fabrice Houdart
- Christiane Taubira
- Lilian Thuram, former French soccer player
- Rama Yade, former Secretary of State for Foreign Affairs and Human Rights of France

== Germany ==
- Volker Beck
- Adolf Brand
- Manfred Bruns
- Benedict Friedlaender
- Magnus Hirschfeld
- Mahide Lein
- Corny Littmann
- Hakan Taş
- Karl Heinrich Ulrichs

== Greece ==
- Jason-Antigone Dane, LGBT activist, first person to ask for official recognition as a non-binary person
- Marina Galanou, trans activist, publisher, writer, and columnist
- Zak Kostopoulos, Greek-American LGBT, AIDS, refugee, sex-worker activist
- Panos H. Koutras, filmmaker and LGBT activist
- Menelas Siafakas, filmmaker and LGBT activist

== Guatemala ==
- Aldo Dávila, politician and first openly gay man and first HIV-positive member of Congress
- Sandra Morán, first out LGBT person ever elected to Congress; LGBT and human rights activist

== Honduras ==
- Erick Martínez Ávila, journalist and LGBT and AIDS activist
- Indyra Mendoza, LGBT activist
- Claudia Spellmant, LGBT and transgender activist
- Walter Tróchez, political activist and LGBT rights leader

== Hungary ==
- Gergely Homonnay, journalist and LGBT activist
- Ildikó Juhász
- Karl Maria Kertbeny, journalist and human rights activist who coined the terms "homosexual" and "heterosexual"

== Iceland ==
- Owl Fisher, youngest trans person to medically transition in Iceland; LGBT activist
- Hörður Torfason

== India ==
- Sonal Giani
- Manvendra Singh Gohil
- Anjali Gopalan
- Anand Grover
- Menaka Guruswamy
- Ashok Row Kavi
- Harish Iyer
- Gopi Shankar Madurai
- Akkai Padmashali
- Sridhar Rangayan
- Ramachandrapurapu Raj Rao
- Laxmi Narayan Tripathi
- Rose Venkatesan

== Indonesia ==
- Dede Oetomo

== Iran ==
- Shadi Amin
- Elham Malekpoor
- Arsham Parsi
- Alireza Shojaian

== Iraq ==
- Zhiar Ali
- Amir Ashour

== Ireland ==
- Suzy Byrne
- Mary Dorcey
- Orla Egan
- Lydia Foy
- Arthur Leahy
- David Norris
- Tonie Walsh
- Katherine Zappone

== Israel ==
- Imri Kalmann, former co-chairperson of the Israeli LGBT Association
- Yair Qedar, founder of Israel's first LGBT newspaper

== Italy ==
- Imma Battaglia
- Franco Grillini
- Vladimir Luxuria

== Jamaica ==
- Maurice Tomlinson, LGBT and HIV/AIDS activist who challenged the homophobic Sodomy Law
- Brian Williamson, co-founded the Jamaica Forum for Lesbians, All-Sexuals and Gays

== Japan ==
- Taiga Ishikawa
- Wataru Ishizaka
- Maki Muraki (born 1974), head of Nijiro Diversity in Osaka
- Kanako Otsuji, first openly lesbian politician in Japan

== Kenya ==
- Edwin Chiloba (deceased)
- Denis Nzioka

== Kyrgyzstan ==
- Dastan Kasmamytov

== Latvia ==
- Kristīne Garina, LGBT activist and co-founder of Mozaīka

== Lebanon ==
- Georges Azzi
- Sandra Melhem
- Hamed Sinno

== Lithuania ==
- Marija Aušrinė Pavilionienė
- Romas Zabarauskas

== Malta ==
- Ruth Baldacchino
- Gabi Calleja
- Mina Tolu

== Mexico ==
- Ociel Baena, activist and Mexico's first non-binary magistrate
- Nancy Cardenas, playwright, director, and LGBT+ activist
- Gloria Angélica Careaga Pérez, social psychologist and activist
- Agnés Torres Hernández, psychologist and transgender activist
- Claudia Hinojosa, LGBT and human rights activist, academic
- Patria Jiménez, the first openly gay member of any Latin American legislature
- Julio César Martín-Trejo, Anglican bishop
- Bamby Salcedo, Mexican-American transgender activist

== Morocco ==
- Ibtissam Lachgar, psychologist and human rights and LGBT activist

== Myanmar ==
- John Lwin, model agency founder, LGBT rights activist
- Shin Thant, one of the leading LGBTQ+ rights activists in Myanmar

== Nepal ==
- Sunil Babu Pant, first openly gay Nepali politician, former head of Blue Diamond Society
- Bhumika Shrestha

== Netherlands ==
- Willem Arondeus
- Vera Bergkamp, former chair of the world's oldest LGBT organization
- John Blankenstein
- Noor van Crevel
- Boris Dittrich
- Coos Huijsen, first openly gay parliamentarian
- Henk Krol
- Betty Paërl
- Marjan Sax
- Leonne Zeegers

== New Zealand ==
- Georgina Beyer, first openly transgender mayor in NZ
- Suran Dickson
- Kevin Hague
- Kassie Hartendorp
- Ngahuia Te Awekotuku
- Derek Williams, co-founder of GaLTaS

== Nigeria ==
- Richard Akuson, lawyer and founder of Nigeria's first LGBT magazine
- Bisi Alimi, British-Nigerian LGBT and HIV/AIDS activist
- Aderonke Apata, LGBT activist and barrister
- Amara Ogara, filmmaker and content creator

== Norway ==
- Kim Friele
- Christian Møllerop, leader of the Oslo and Akershus LLH

== Pakistan ==
- Faisal Alam
- Nayyab Ali
- Almas Bobby
- Sara Gill
- Nadeem Kashish
- Aradhiya Khan
- Bindiya Rana
- Nisha Rao

== Palestine ==
- Khader Abu-Seif
- Rauda Morcos
- Bashar Murad
- Ghadir Shafie
- Ahmed Shihab-Eldin

== Panama ==
- Gilberto Gerald, gay rights and HIV/AIDS activist, co-founder of the National Coalition of Black Lesbians and Gays

== Peru ==
- Belissa Andía Pérez
- Luisa Revilla
- Giovanny Romero Infante

== Philippines ==
- Boy Abunda
- Tonette Lopez

== Poland ==
- Robert Biedroń
- Krzysztof Garwatowski
- Anna Grodzka
- Yga Kostrzewa
- Krystian Legierski
- Paweł Leszkowicz
- Szymon Niemiec

== Portugal ==
- Miguel Vale de Almeida
- António Serzedelo

== Qatar ==
- Naser Mohamed

== Romania ==
- Lucian Dunăreanu
- Péter Eckstein-Kovács

== Russia ==
- Nikolai Alekseev
- Evgeny Belyakov
- Ali Feruz
- Igor Kochetkov, head of the LGBT Network
- Yekaterina Samutsevich
- Evgeny Shtorn
- Yulia Tsvetkova
- Mikhail Tumasov
- Yuma Yuma

== Serbia ==
- Goran Jevtić, actor
- Merlinka
- Lepa Mladjenovic
- Dejan Nebrigić
- Kristian Ranđelović
- Sajsi MC
- Sonja Sajzor
- Boban Stojanović, activist

== Sierra Leone ==
- FannyAnn Eddy

== Singapore ==
- Alex Au
- Paddy Chew, first person in Singapore to come out as HIV-positive
- Jean Chong

== Slovakia ==
- Zuzana Čaputová
- Imrich Matyáš
- Romana Schlesinger
- Michal Šimečka

== Somalia ==
- Farah Abdullahi Abdi
- Amal Aden
- Sumaya Dalmar

== South Africa ==
- Abdurrazack "Zackie" Achmat
- Midi Achmat, LGBT activist, co-founder of Treatment Action Campaign (TAC), Association of Bisexuals, Gays, and Lesbians (ABIGALE) and the National Coalition of Lesbian and Gay Equality (NCLGE)
- Dawn Cavanagh
- Muhsin Hendricks
- Busi Kheswa
- Sheila Lapinsky, anti-apartheid and LGBT activist
- Simon Nkoli, LGBT activist, founder of the Gay and Lesbian Organisation of the Witwatersrand
- Noxolo Nogwaza
- Funeka Soldaat, leader of Free Gender Organisation in Khayelitsha, Western Cape

== South Korea ==
- Jeong Yol
- Kim-Jho Gwangsoo
- Kwak Yi-kyong
- Lee Gye-deok
- Lim Tae-hoon
- Seo Dong-jin
- Yun Hyon-seok

== Spain ==
- Ángeles Álvarez
- Carla Antonelli
- Ian Bermúdez Raventós, philologist and trans* activist
- Oriol Pamies
- Lucas Platero Spanish educator and researcher

== Sri Lanka ==
- Sherman de Rose
- Rosanna Flamer-Caldera

== St. Lucia ==
- Kenita Placide

== Sudan ==
- Ahmed Umar

== Sweden ==
- Anna Mohr

== Switzerland ==
- Röbi Rapp
- Anna Rosenwasser
- Anna Vock

== Syria ==
- Abdulrahman Akkad

== Taiwan ==
- Chi Chia-wei
- Josephine Ho

== Thailand ==
- Vitit Muntarbhorn
- Matcha Phorn-in

== Trinidad and Tobago ==
- Jason Jones
- Jowelle de Souza

== Tunisia ==
- Mounir Baatour

== Turkey ==
- Demet Demir
- Hande Kader (deceased)
- Yasemin Öz
- Barış Sulu
- Mehmet Tarhan

== Uganda ==
- Julius Kaggwa
- David Kato
- Sandra Kwikiriza
- Kasha Nabagesera
- Pepe Julian Onziema

== Ukraine ==
- Bogdan Globa
- Vitalina Koval
- Viktor Pylypenko, gay activist advocating for the rights of LGBTQ+ service members.

== United Kingdom ==
- Jeremy Bentham, 19th-century jurist, philosopher, and legal and social reformer
- Bette Bourne, actor, performer, founder of the gay theatrical troupe Bloolips; one of the first modern-day UK LGBTQ+ activists and campaigners
- Michael C. Burgess, courier and co-treasurer of OutRage!
- Christine Burns, trans rights campaigner, formerly a vice president of PfC, awarded MBE for work with PfC and on the GRB
- Tanya Compas, queer Black rights activist based in London
- A.E. Dyson, literary critic and founder of the Homosexual Law Reform Society
- Jackie Forster, actress, TV personality and lesbian campaigner
- Moud Goba, LGBTIQ+ human rights activist
- Ray Gosling, writer, broadcaster and gay rights activist in the Campaign for Homosexual Equality
- Antony Grey, secretary of the Homosexual Law Reform Society; the public face of the Albany Trust
- Liam Hackett, founder of anti-bullying website and charity Ditch the Label
- Derek Jarman, film director
- Craig Jones, LGBTQ+ rights campaigner for the UK armed forces, founder of Fighting with Pride and author
- Paris Lees, trans rights campaigner, part of Trans Media Watch
- Denis Lemon, editor of Gay News, involved in blasphemy prosecution brought by Mary Whitehouse
- Ian McKellen, actor and spokesperson for Stonewall (UK)
- Robert Mellors, 20th-century writer and Gay Liberation Front campaigner
- Andrew Moffat, LGBT education advocate, author and founder the No Outsiders programme
- Phyll Opoku-Gyimah, British political activist and co-founder of UK Black Pride
- Paul Patrick, anti-homophobia activist and educator
- Saima Razzaq, LGBT inclusive education activist and Birmingham Pride Head of Diversity and Inclusion
- Michael Schofield, sociologist and early gay rights campaigner
- Michael Steed, Liberal politician, academic and gay rights activist in the Campaign for Homosexual Equality
- Ben Summerskill, former chief executive of Stonewall
- Peter Tatchell, politician, human rights and LGBT rights campaigner
- Stephen Whittle, trans rights campaigner and former vice president of PfC and president of HBIGDA, Law Professor at MMU, awarded OBE for work with PfC and on the GRB
- Derek Williams, co-founder of GaLTaS

== United States ==
- Kimball Allen, author of Secrets of a Gay Mormon Felon and Be Happy Be Mormon
- Jacob Appel, New York City-based lawyer, advocate for reparations for gays and lesbians
- Gilbert Baker (1951–2017), designer of the rainbow flag
- Tammy Baldwin (1962–), U.S. Senator from Wisconsin since 2013, first openly LGBTQ senator.
- Christopher R. Barron, co-founder of GOProud, a political organization representing gay conservatives
- Paul Barwick
- Vic Basile, first executive director of the Human Rights Campaign
- Henry Berg-Brousseau, press secretary for the Human Rights Campaign
- Wayne Besen, founder of Truth Wins Out, former spokesman for the Human Rights Campaign
- Elizabeth Birch, former executive director of the Human Rights Campaign
- Dustin Lance Black, founding board member of the American Foundation for Equal Rights
- Chaz Bono, transgender son of Sonny Bono and Cher
- Jennifer Finney Boylan (1958– ), transgender author, professor, and trans rights activist, former co-chair of GLAAD's National Board of Directors
- David P. Brill (1955–1979), Boston-based journalist
- Blake Brockington (1996–2015), transgender rights activist
- Jenny Bruso, hiker, influencer, and activist for inclusivity and body positivity
- Jenn Burleton, educator and advocate for transgender and gender-diverse youth; founder of TransActive Education & Advocacy
- Judith Butler, philosopher and gender theorist
- Margarethe Cammermeyer, former colonel in the Washington National Guard whose coming out story was made into the 1995 movie Serving in Silence
- Gloria Casarez (1971–2014), Latina lesbian civil rights leader and LGBT activist in Philadelphia; Philadelphia's first director of LGBT affairs
- Ryan Cassata, transgender activist, public speaker and singer-songwriter
- June Chan, Asian American lesbian activist
- Joanne Conte, trans woman, former Arvada, Colorado City Councilor, currently hosts a radio show on KGNU
- Lynn Conway, trans woman computer scientist and electrical engineer
- Ruby Corado, Salvadoran activist and founder of Casa Ruby
- James Dale, known for landmark 2000 US Supreme Court case Boy Scouts of America v. Dale that challenged the Boy Scouts of America policy of excluding gay youth and adults
- Alphonso David (born 1970), first person of color to serve as president for the Human Rights Campaign; served as a staff attorney for Lambda Legal where he worked on New York State's first same-sex marriage case, Hernandez v. Robles also the Former Deputy Secretary and Counsel for Civil Rights for New York State under Andrew Cuomo
- Ellen DeGeneres (26 January 1958, Metairie, Louisiana), comedian, television host, actress, writer, producer, and LGBTQ activist
- Stephen Donaldson (1946–1996), early bisexual LGBT rights activist founder of the first American gay students' organization, first person to fight a discharge from the U.S. military for homosexuality, also an important figure in the modern bisexual rights movement
- Julie Dorf (born 1965, Milwaukee, Wisconsin), international LGBT human rights advocate and founder of OutRight Action International
- Fran Drescher (born 1957, Flushing, New York), outspoken healthcare advocate and LGBT rights activist
- Mason J. Dunn (born 1985), lawyer, educator, and LGBTQ+ rights advocate based in Massachusetts
- John Duran
- Sarah Kate Ellis (born 1971), president & CEO of GLAAD
- Steve Endean (1948–1993), founder of the Human Rights Campaign Fund
- Arden Eversmeyer (1931–2022), founder of Lesbians Over Age Fifty (LOAF) and the Old Lesbian Oral Herstory Project (OLOHP)
- Sallie Fiske, journalist and LGBTQ activist
- Matt Foreman (born 1953), executive director of the National Gay and Lesbian Task Force (NGLTF)
- Barney Frank (1940–2026), member of the Democratic Party who served as a member of Congress from Massachusetts from 1981 to 2013
- Aaron Fricke (born 1962), sued the Cumberland, Rhode Island school system in 1980 and won a landmark First Amendment case granting him the legal right to attend prom with another boy, an experience he chronicled in the gay coming-of-age memoir Reflections of a Rock Lobster
- Lady Gaga, bisexual singer/songwriter who campaigned for the DADT repeal; released pro-gay anthem "Born This Way" (2011)
- Allen Ginsberg (1926–1997), Beat poet and political activist
- Barbara Gittings (1932–2007), founder of the New York City chapter of the Daughters of Bilitis; pushed for the American Psychological Association to remove homosexuality from its list of mental disorders in the Diagnostic and Statistical Manual of Mental Disorders (DSM)
- Neil Giuliano
- Alexander John Goodrum (1960–2002), transgender civil rights activist
- Chad Griffin (born 1973), former president of the Human Rights Campaign; founder of American Foundation for Equal Rights, a nonprofit organization that supported the plaintiffs in the California Proposition 8 trial
- James Gruber (1928–2011), original member of the Mattachine Society
- Hardy Haberman, author, filmmaker, prominent member of the Leather/Fetish/BDSM community, and activist involved in founding of first LGBT group in Dallas, TX
- David M. Hall, author of Allies at Work: Creating a Lesbian, Gay, Bisexual and Transgender Inclusive Work Environment, speaks to corporate audiences across the country, co-founder of Out & Equal Philadelphia
- Harry Hay (1912–2002), co-founder of the Mattachine Society
- John Heilman
- Essex Hemphill (1957–1995), poet
- Daniel Hernandez Jr. (born 1990), member of Tucson's city commission on gay, lesbian, bisexual and transgender issues, who was credited with saving the life of U.S. Representative Gabby Giffords after the 2011 Tucson shooting
- Brenda Howard (1946–2005), bisexual LGBT rights activist, instrumental figure in the immediate post-Stonewall era in New York City, also an important figure in the modern bisexual rights movement
- John Paul Hudson (1929–2002), activist, journalist, actor, and author; helped organize NYC's first gay pride parade following the Stonewall riots, serving as the parade's first grand marshal
- Sally Huffer (born 1965), board member of multiple LGBT non profit organizations
- Richard Isay (1934–2012)
- Cheryl Jacques (born 1962), former member of the Massachusetts State Legislature; former president of the Human Rights Campaign, resigned shortly after the passage of 11 state constitutional amendments banning gay marriage
- Helen G. James
- Dale Jennings (1917–2000), co-founder of the Mattachine Society
- Marsha P. Johnson (1945–1992)
- Cleve Jones (born 1954), conceived the NAMES Project AIDS Memorial Quilt and worked with Harvey Milk; co-founded the San Francisco AIDS Foundation
- Christine Jorgensen (1926–1989), first person to become widely known for having sex reassignment surgery in the United States
- Frank Kameny (1925–2011), participant in many gay rights rallies of the 1960s and 1970s, most notably the push in 1972–1973 for the American Psychological Association to remove homosexuality from its list of mental disorders in the Diagnostic and Statistical Manual of Mental Disorders (DSM)
- Norm Kent
- Morris Kight (1919–2003), founder of Los Angeles' Gay and Lesbian Front and Los Angeles Gay and Lesbian Center
- C. D. Kirven
- Lisa Kove (born 1958), executive director of the Department of Defense Federal Globe and President of Empowering Spirits Foundation
- Larry Kramer (1935–2020), author and playwright who helped form the prominent gay rights organizations Gay Men's Health Crisis and AIDS Coalition to Unleash Power (ACT-UP)
- Kiyoshi Kuromiya (1943–2000), author and civil rights, anti-war, gay liberation, and HIV/AIDS activist
- Janice Langbehn (born 1968), campaigner for same-sex marriage and same-sex hospital visitation after being denied access to her dying partner, Lisa Marie Pond, in 2007
- Cyndi Lauper (born 1953), founder of the True Colors Fund charity, which promotes equality for members of the LGBT community
- Malcolm L. Lazin
- Audre Lorde
- Scott Long (born 1963), executive director of the Lesbian, Gay, Bisexual, and Transgender Rights Program at Human Rights Watch
- Courtney Love (born 1964), a musician and singer, has advocated for LGBT rights and acceptance since the beginning of her career in the early 1990s
- Phyllis Lyon (1924–2020), lesbian activist who co-founded the Daughters of Bilitis with longtime partner Del Martin
- Deacon Maccubbin (born 1943), founder of Washington D.C.'s first Pride parade and the Lambda Literary Awards
- Madonna (born 1958), entertainer and long-term human and civil rights activist; has offered outspoken support for the gay rights movement
- David Madson (1963–1997), gay activist, architect who advocated for a memorial in Minneapolis to honor victims of the HIV/AIDS epidemic.
- Del Martin (1921–2008), lesbian activist, co-founded the Daughters of Bilitis with longtime partner Phyllis Lyon
- Sarah McBride (born 1990), first openly transgender member of the United States Congress, author and LGBTQ rights activist.
- Tim McFeeley
- Aldyn Mckean, singer and gay rights/AIDS activist
- Harvey Milk (1930–1978), openly gay city supervisor of San Francisco, California; assassinated (along with mayor George Moscone) in 1978 by Dan White
- David Nelson (born 1962), founder of Gay and Lesbian Utah Democrats and Stonewall Shooting Sports of Utah
- Jack Nichols (1937–2005), journalist, writer, activist and co-founder of the Mattachine Society of Washington, D.C., with Frank Kameny
- Barbara Noda, advocate for LGBT rights in the San Francisco Bay Area
- Tyler Oakley
- Paula Overby, transgender author, parent, mental health counselor, computer technician, minor party, LGBTQ, and cannabis rights leader who died four weeks before the 2022 elections, while campaigning as a Legal Marijuana Now! Party nominee for United States Congress from Minnesota
- Brooklyn Owen (born 2000)
- Romaine Patterson (1978–), lesbian talk show host and founder of Angel Action
- Troy Perry
- Charles Pitts
- Jack Quillin, LGBTQ+ activist
- Sylvia Rivera
- Marsh P Johnson
- Brandan Robertson
- Geena Rocero
- Craig Rodwell
- Abby Rubenfeld
- RuPaul, drag queen and gay activist known for the TV show RuPaul's Drag Race
- Vito Russo
- Bayard Rustin (1912–1987), openly gay civil rights activist, principal organizer and co-leader of the 1963 March on Washington for Jobs and Freedom and advisor to Martin Luther King Jr.; gay rights activist in later life
- Ryan Sallans (born 1979), out trans man and public speaker, travels around US educating high school and college students on LGBT issues
- Graciela Sanchez (born 1960), social justice activist, founder of the Esperanza Peace and Justice Center
- José Sarria (1922–2013), first openly gay candidate for political office in the United States, founder of the Imperial Court System
- Tully Satre
- Dan Savage
- Richard L. Schlegel (1927–2006), Pennsylvania activist whose wrongful termination suit is considered an early landmark case for gay rights
- Josh Seefried, United States Air Force first lieutenant and co-director of OutServe, the association of actively serving LGBT military
- Drew Shafer (1936–1989), gay activist from Kansas City, Missouri, known for bringing the homophile movement to KC, and publishing The Phoenix: Midwest Homophile Voice
- Michelangelo Signorile
- Charles Silverstein (1935–2023), gay psychologist who was the founder of the Journal of Homosexuality and key in testifying against the classification of homosexuality as a mental disorder
- Ruth Simpson (1926–2008), founder of the first lesbian community center, former President of Daughters of Bilitis New York, author of From the Closet to the Courts
- Nadine Smith (born 1965), LGBTQ+ rights activist
- Joe Solmonese (born 1965), former political fundraiser and past president of the Human Rights Campaign
- A. Latham Staples (born 1977), founder and chairman of the Empowering Spirits Foundation; president & CEO of EXUSMED, Inc.
- Abby Stein (born 1991), advocate for transgender people of Orthodox Jewish background
- Lou Sullivan
- Andy Thayer, co-founder of the Gay Liberation Network
- Urvashi Vaid (1958–2022), Indian-American activist, has worked for over 25 years promoting civil rights for gay, lesbian, bisexual and transgender persons
- Adela Vázquez, San Francisco based Cuban transgender activist, member of Proyecto ContraSIDA por Vida, and others.
- Elisha Wiesel (born 1972), hedge fund manager and activist
- Phill Wilson (born 1956, Chicago, Illinois), co-founder of the National Black Lesbian & Gay Leadership Forum and founder of the Black AIDS Institute
- Evan Wolfson
- William E. Woods (1949–2008), gay rights activist in Hawaii who in 1991 set in motion the legalization of same-sex marriage in the US
- Chely Wright

== Uruguay ==
- Delfina Martínez
- Marcela Pini

== Venezuela ==
- Tamara Adrián, lawyer, LGBT and trans activist who became Venezuela's first openly trans elected official
- Daniel Arzola, writer, artist, and activist
- Quiteria Franco
- Feliciano Reyna

== Vietnam ==
- Lương Thế Huy

== Zambia ==
- Kapya Kaoma
- John Abdallah Wambere

== Zimbabwe ==
- Moud Goba
- Rikki Nathanson
- Tsitsi Tiripano

== See also ==
- List of LGBT rights organizations
- LGBTQ social movements
- List of LGBT firsts by year
- List of years in LGBT rights
