= Pini =

Pini may refer to:

== People ==
=== Surname ===
- Anthony Pini (Carlos Antonio Pini; 1902–1989), Argentinian cellist, soloist, orchestral section leader and chamber musician
- Antonio Pini-Corsi (1858(?)–1918), Italian operatic baritone
- Carolina Pini (1988–), Italian soccer player
- Ermenegildo Pini (1739–1825), Italian clergyman, naturalist, mathematician, geologist and philosopher
- Ezequiel Pini (1985-), Argentinian digital artist and designer
- Giorgio Pini (1899–1987), Italian politician and journalist
- Giovanni Pini (1992–), Italian professional basketball player
- Karen Pini (Karen Jo Pini; 1957–), first runner-up at the 1976 Miss World pageant
- Lucila Pini (1930-1974), Brazilian sprinter
- Marcela Pini (1972-), Uruguayan activist and psychologist
- Matt Pini (Matthew James Pini; 1969–), Australian-born Italian naturalized rugby union player
- Napoleone Pini (1835-1907), Italian zoologist and palaeontologist
- Rodolfo Pini (1926–2000), Uruguayan footballer
- Ryan Pini (1981–), 3-time Olympic swimmer from Papua New Guinea
- Tiziana Pini (1958–), Italian actress and television personality
- Wendy and Richard Pini (1951– and 1950–), creators of the Elfquest series
- Yoav Pini Jarafi (born 1993), Israeli footballer who plays as goalkeeper

=== Given name ===
- Pinhas "Pini" Badash (1952–), Israeli politician
- Pini Balili (born 1979), Israeli footballer
- Pinchas "Pini" Ben-Porat (1914-1955), one of Israel's first aviators
- Pinchas Eliezer "Pini" Dunner (born 1970), orthodox rabbi living in Beverly Hills, CA
- Pini Gershon (born 1951), Israeli basketball player and coach
- Pini Shomer (1951–), Israeli former politician
- Pinhas "Pini" Zahavi (1955–), Israeli football agent

== Other uses ==
- Pini (web series), the 2010 web series that was broadcast on Ynet
- Pini people, an Australian Aboriginal people of Western Australia
- Pini, a village in Victor Vlad Delamarina Commune, Timiș County, Romania
- Pini, one of the Batu Islands
- Poggio dei Pini, in south-west Sardinia, Italy
