= Sarah Gill =

Sarah Gill may refer to:

- Sarah Gill (rugby union) (born 1983), Scottish rugby union player in 2010 Women's Rugby World Cup squad
- Sarah Prince Gill (1728–1761), American Christian prayer group leader and writer
- Sarah Ann Gill (1795–1866), social and religious leader in Barbados
- Sarah Jane Gill (1848–1932), English marmalade maker
- Sarah Gill (physician), Pakistani physician and transgender activist
