= Rosenwasser =

Rosenwasser is a surname, meaning "rose water" in the German language. Notable people named Rosenwasser include:

- Anna Rosenwasser (born 1990), Swiss journalist, editorialist, and political and pro-LGBTQ-activist
- Dara Rosenwasser (born 1974), American artist, educator, creative Producer and director
