= Pierre Guénin =

French journalist and gay rights activist (1927–2017)

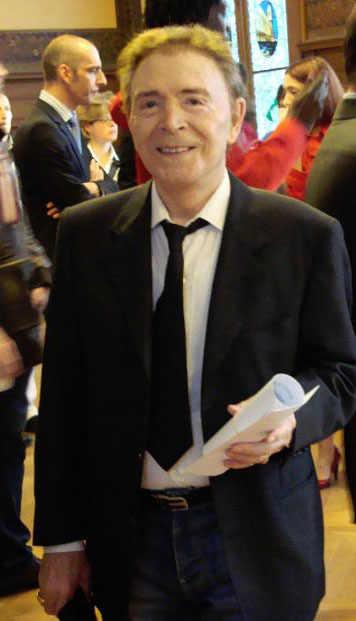
- Pierre Guénin in 2012
- Born: 19 February 1927; Étampes, France
- Died: 1 March 2017 (aged 90); Paris, France
- Occupation: Journalist

Pierre Guénin (19 February 1927 – 1 March 2017) was a French journalist and gay rights activist. He was an early publisher of LGBT magazines in the late 1960s and the 1970s, and the founder of the LGBT film awards in France. He was the founder of the eponymous Prix Pierre Guénin for LGBT activists.

== Early life ==
Pierre Guénin was born in Étampes, France on 19 February 1927.

== Career ==
Guénin was a journalist for Cinémonde, a magazine about cinema.

Guénin founded Editions S.A.N., a publisher of LGBT magazines, in 1967. He was the founding editor of Eden and Olympe, whose circulations were forbidden under President Valéry Giscard d'Estaing in 1978. He subsequently founded In and Jean-Paul.

Guénin founded the Prix Off, the first awards for LGBT films in France, in 1978. In 2009, he founded the Prix Pierre Guénin, an annual prize for LGBT activists.

Guénin was the author of several books.

== Death ==
Guénin died on 1 March 2017 in Paris at the age of 90.

== Works ==
- Guénin, Pierre (1961). Le jeu de la vérité. Paris: Terrain vague. OCLC 902281821.
- Guénin, Pierre (1975). Le sexe a trois faces. Paris: S.A.N. OCLC 144695216.
- Guénin, Pierre (1984). Le guide du futur. Paris: Le Cherche midi. ISBN 9782862740584. OCLC 14212796.
- Guénin, Pierre (1990). La mort d'un ami : journal intime. Paris: Le Milieu du jour. ISBN 9782863662397. OCLC 463117001.
- Guénin, Pierre (2006). La gay révolution: 1920-2006. Paris: Cosmo. ISBN 9782916028033. OCLC 863307505.
