= Bindiya Rana =

Pakistani transgender activist

- Born: Abdul Aziz
- Citizenship: Pakistan
- Occupation: Transgender rights activist
- Organization: Gender Interactive Alliance
- Title: Founder and president, Gender Interactive Alliance

Bindiya Rana is a Pakistani transgender activist who is the founder and president of the Gender Interactive Alliance (GIA), headquartered in Karachi. In 2013, she stood as a candidate for a seat in the Sindh Provincial Assembly but was unsuccessful.

== Early life ==
Rana was born into a family of twelve siblings. During her adolescence, she spent time in a dera, a communal residence for trans persons. With her father's support, she rented an apartment in Karachi at the age of fifteen. Her family, initially hesitant, came to accept and support her identity.

== Career ==
Rana is the founder and president of the Gender Interactive Alliance (GIA). Other executive members have included Rifee Khan, Rimsha, and Sara Gill. The GIA has assisted its members in obtaining national identity cards. Rana has also served as a petitioner in the Sindh High Court on matters relating to transgender rights, and is regarded as one of the principal representatives of the Khwaja Sara community in Pakistan.

In 2013, Rana contested a seat in the Sindh Provincial Assembly in Karachi, becoming one of Pakistan's first transgender candidates to stand in a general election. She received death threats during the campaign and was required to file a case in the Supreme Court of Pakistan after her gender identity was cited as an obstacle to her candidacy. She did not secure a seat.

Within her community, Rana holds the status of guru, with over fifty apprentices, known as chelas. She has criticised the undercounting of transgender persons in the Pakistani census, arguing that official figures fell well short of credible estimates. Rana is an advocate for transgender healthcare and has spoken out against sexual violence directed at trans persons. She has supported the establishment of free medical camps for women and children in interior Sindh and Balochistan.

In December 2015, Rana participated in protests against the absence of dedicated polling arrangements for transgender persons during the local government elections. The protests contributed to a decision by parts of the trans community to boycott the polls.
