= Aradhiya Khan =

Trans woman activist and social worker

- Born: c.1998 Abu Dhabi

Aradhiya Khan (born: c.1998) is a Pakistani transgender activist and social worker who works for the transgender community and economically-marginalized.

== Activism ==
Khan has voluntarily worked with numerous transgender organizations such as PECHRA Organization Sindh Transgender Welfare Network, HYPE Network (Rutgers WPF), and Sub Rang Society. She has also served as an election observer (Election Commission of Pakistan) and Free and Fair Election Network (FAFEN) for the general elections of 2018. In 2018, she was part of the consultative process for the Transgender Protection Bill.

In July 2019, Khan contributed to the memorandum of understanding between her organization Akhuwat and Unilever Pakistan to work on a diversity and inclusion program which aimed at creating employment opportunities at a multinational organization for the transgender community for the very first time in Pakistan. She was interviewed by Leader TV in Oct 2019.

Khan has represented the transgender community on national and international media forums such as Express Tribune, Dawn News, Geo News, Al Jazeera, Asia Times, VOA Urdu and Independent Urdu highlighting the condition of Pakistan's transgender community through awareness sessions and public speaking presentations at various non-profit organizations, universities and schools throughout the country.

Khan aspires to bring more visibility and representation of the Pakistani transgender community by promoting equality and human rights in Pakistan.
