= Alexander John Goodrum =

American activist

- Goodrum in an undated photo
- Born: 1960
- Died: September 28, 2002 (aged 41–42); Tucson, Arizona
- Occupations: activist, writer, and educator

Alexander John Goodrum (1960–2002) was an African-American transgender civil rights activist, writer, and educator. He was the founder and director of TGNet Arizona. He was a board member of the Tucson GLBT Commission, and the Funding Exchange's OUT Fund, which allocates an annual grant named after Goodrum to LGBTQ community organizing projects such as the Latina lesbian magazine, Esto no tiene nombre, edited in part by Tatiana de la tierra.

Goodrum was bisexual, disabled, and a trans man, he wrote about his gender influencing spirituality. His book, "Gender Identity 101: A Transgender Primer" has been reprinted in various forms to educate mainstream society on basic questions regarding transsexual and transgender people. His work is carried on by the Southern Arizona Gender Alliance (SAGA).

== Death ==
Goodrum died by suicide on September 28, 2002, while at La Frontera Psychiatric Health Facility, a psychiatric ward. His death was unexpected and investigation into the facilities handling of his case prompted some procedural and physical changes at La Frontera.

== Legacy ==
In 2003, he was posthumously awarded the Godat Award, which honors lifetime service to the LGBTQ community.

In 2015, SAGA initiated the Alexander John Goodrum Catalyst of Change award. The first honoree was TV and film star Laverne Cox.

== See also ==
- List of LGBT rights activists
- List of LGBT rights organizations
