= Bogdan Globa =

Ukrainian human rights activist (born 1988)

- Богдан Глоба
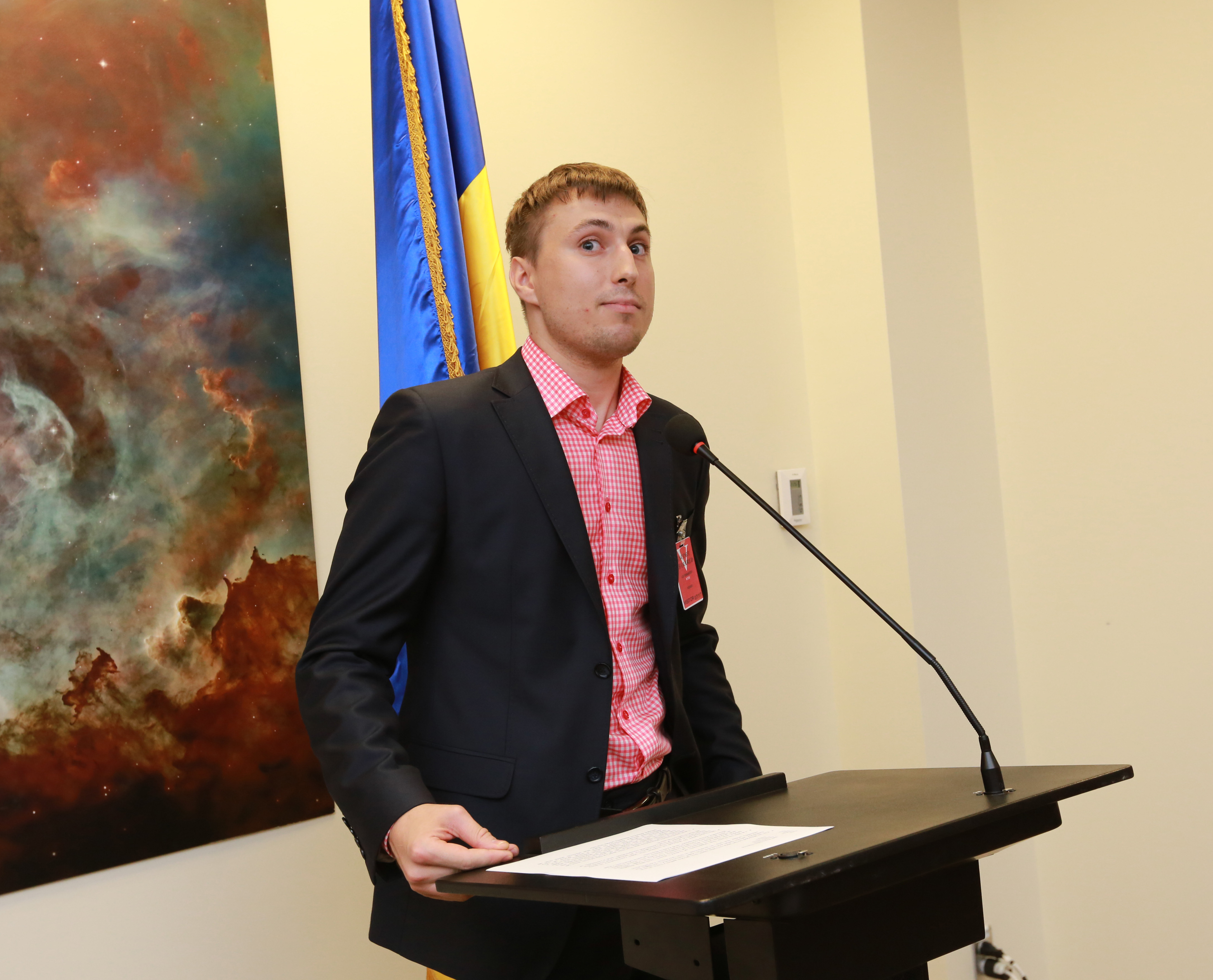
- Globa in 2013
- Born: 26 May 1988 (age 37); Zachepylivka, Kharkiv Oblast, Ukrainian SSR, Soviet Union
- Occupation: Activist

Bohdan Serhiyovych Hloba (sometimes Bogdan Globa; Ukrainian: Богдан Сергійович Глоба; born 26 May 1988) is a Ukrainian LGBT rights activist who claimed asylum in the United States in 2016 and in 2018 founded ProudUkraine.

== Early life ==
Hloba was born in 1988 in Zachepylivka, which was then part of the Kharkiv Oblast in the Ukrainian SSR. His family were teachers, with his mother teaching english and his father economic theory. In 1995, the family moved to the city of Poltava. At age fifteen, he came out to his parents, after which he was forced to leave the family home. In the aftermath of the Orange Revolution in 2004, Hloba stated he became more inspired to be active in human rights, and in 2006 he moved to the capital Kyiv.

In 2011, he obtained a master's degree from Poltava University of Economics and Trade, and then later in 2015 he completed additional studies in a management development program at the Kyiv-Mohyla Business School. His focus was on "Management: The Art of Making Management Decisions."

== Activism ==
In 2009, Globa co-founded the charity Point of Support, later working as its CEO. After completing a course titled "Advocacy of LGBT rights in the USA", he founded TERGO, a support organization for parents of LGBT+ children.

On 7 November 2013, speaking during parliamentary hearings on European integration and anti-discrimination legislation, Globa was the first openly LGBT person to address Verkhovna Rada, the Ukrainian parliament.

On 26 May 2015, the Holosiivskyi District Court of Kyiv opened proceedings to establish the existence of discrimination on the grounds of sexual orientation on the suit of Bogdan Globa to the Democratic Alliance (Ukraine). The case stemmed from Hloba attempting to apply for membership to the Kyiv branch of the Democratic Alliance, to which he was denied with a party representatives stating that the party identified as "Christian-democratic" and that they were against his advocacy for same-sex marriage. Hloba stated under Article 24 of the Ukrainian Constitution, the party was not allowed to restrict based on sexual orientation. The case is pending before the European Court of Human Rights.

== Personal life ==
On 30 January 2019, he married his partner Vasyl, who is from Vinnytsia, in a ceremony in New York. They currently reside in New York City.
