= Jenn Burleton =

American educator and transgender youth advocate

Burleton speaking at the Portland Air National Guard Base in 2016

Jenn Burleton is an American educator, advocate, and former professional musician whose work has focused on transgender and gender-diverse children and families. She founded TransActive Education & Advocacy, an Oregon organization that later became the TransActive Gender Project at Lewis & Clark Graduate School of Education and Counseling.

== Career ==
=== Music ===
Burleton began her professional career as a musician, songwriter, and arranger in 1974 and continued working in music until 2010, including as a guitarist and keyboardist. A 1991 U.S. Copyright Office record lists Jennifer Burleton, using the pseudonym Brenna Page, as a claimant for the unpublished musical work Wolf/Page collection 1.

Burleton co-produced Travis Rush's 2006 debut album, Come and Get It, with Rush and contributed to its songwriting. U.S. Copyright Office records identify Burleton and Rush jointly as claimants for three songs that appeared on the album: "I Wanna Be with You", "You Gotta Live", and the title track.

In a 2013 interview with PQ Monthly, Burleton said that she had twice performed at the Michigan Womyn's Music Festival in the late 1980s and early 1990s. She later supported a boycott by performers in opposition to the festival's exclusionary admissions policy.

=== Advocacy and education ===
Burleton founded TransActive Education & Advocacy in 2007. The organization supported transgender and gender-diverse children and their families through family groups, referrals, school advocacy, and professional training. Oregon business records show that the nonprofit incorporated in December 2008 and changed its name to TransActive Gender Center in 2013.

The San Francisco Bay Times reported in 2008 that Burleton had earlier helped establish Trans Youth Family Allies. In 2007, she produced and directed Transgender Children—Out of the Shadows, a short film about transgender and gender-nonconforming young people.

The New York Times reported that Burleton's advocacy for access to puberty blockers followed a 2006 presentation by physician Norman Spack. According to the Times, after returning to Oregon she encouraged pediatric endocrinologists to offer the treatment to adolescent patients. Oregon Health Authority meeting records also document her testimony about transgender healthcare coverage in 2014.

In 2019, TransActive became the TransActive Gender Project at Lewis & Clark Graduate School of Education and Counseling, with Burleton serving as program director. Reporting at the time described the project as continuing family support and professional education while expanding its institutional partnerships.

In 2025, Oregon Capital Chronicle described Burleton as an advocate and consultant and quoted her about continuing barriers to transgender healthcare in Oregon.

== Recognition ==
Burleton received the Multnomah County Citizen Involvement Committee's Sy Award in 2014 for her social-justice work. In 2021, LGBTQ Nation selected her for its Hometown Hero recognition for her advocacy on behalf of transgender youth.
