= Fernando Cerón =

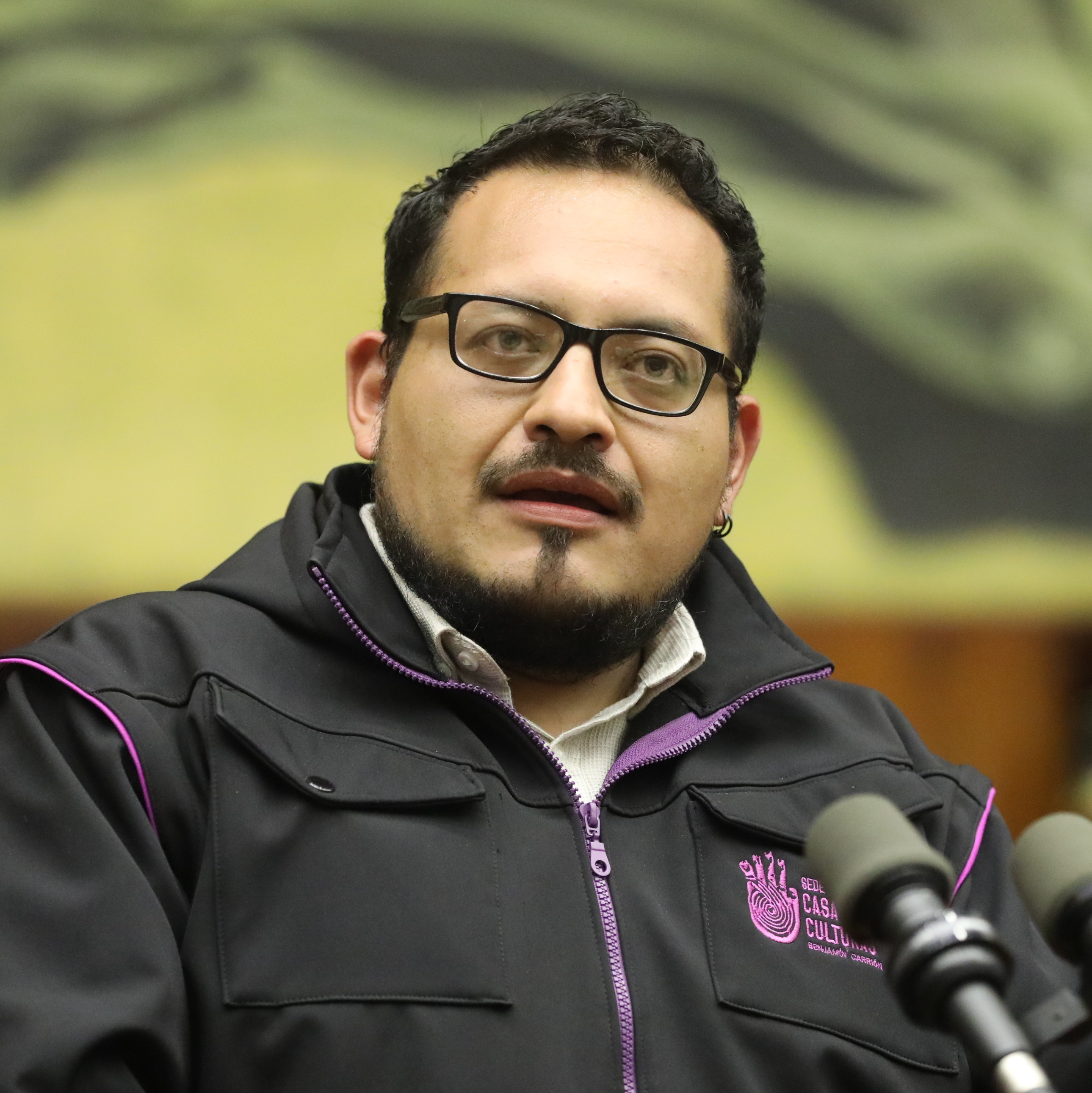
- Fernando Cerón Córdova in 2022

President of Casa de la Cultura Ecuatoriana
- Incumbent
- Assumed office 30 August 2021
- Preceded by: Camilo Restrepo Guzmán (es)

Personal details
- Born: 1989 (age 36–37) Ambato, Ecuador
- Education: Pontifical Catholic University of Ecuador
- Occupation: Sociologist; Cultural manager; LGBTQ rights activist

Fernando Cerón Córdova (born 1989) is an Ecuadorian sociologist, cultural manager, and LGBTQ rights activist. He has served as the president of the Casa de la Cultura Ecuatoriana since 2021.

== Career ==
As a teenager, Fernando Cerón Córdova was influenced by the leftist ideas of his grandfather, who was a leader of a trade union. When he was in his final year of secondary school, he was expelled for painting graffiti. At the age of 16, he co-founded the cultural collective Pandemonium, along with other young, through which they carried out social protest via street art and literature.

After rejoining and graduating from school, Cerón traveled to Quito and studied sociology at the Pontifical Catholic University of Ecuador, where he participated in various theatrical, literary and artistic projects. As a sociologist, he worked as a researcher on the studying Ecuador's Kichwa population.

In August 2015, Cerón participated in the occupation of the Basilica Catedral de Ambato, organized by indigenous peoples as a form of support for the Confederation of Indigenous Nationalities of Ecuador (CONAIE). He acted as spokesman for the protestors and claimed that they were seeking response from the national government to a series of demands raised by the CONAIE.

In 2017, Cerón was elected as the director of the Tungurahua chapter of the Casa de la Cultura Ecuatoriana (House of Ecuadorian Culture). At the age of 27 years, he was the youngest director in the history of the Tungurahua chapter of the organization.

On 30 August 2021, Cerón was elected as the national president of the Casa de la Cultura Ecuatoriana from among six candidates. His proposals included professionalization of Ecuadorian artists, decentralization of the institution's resources and the opening of the institution to traditionally excluded groups including indigenous people and Afro-descendant peoples, various urban subcultures and sexual diversity groups.

After taking office, Cerón denounced the existence of individuals on the institution's payroll who were not performing any work, as well as other administrative irregularities, such as the use of institutional spaces for private purposes. In 2025, he was re-elected as president of the Casa de la Cultura.

=== Activism ===
Cerón identifies himself as part of the LGBTQ community. In his role as an activist for the rights of gender and sexual diversity groups, he has been involved with the collectives such as La Bola Minoritaria ("The Minority Ball"), Ambato Dispar ("Diverse Ambato"), Colectivo Independiente de Derechos Humanos ("Independent Human Rights Collective"), and Colectivo Visión y Diversidad ("Vision and Diversity Collective").

He has also engaged in environmental activism, as a part of the Geo Juvenil ("Geo Juvenile") and Colectivo Yasunidos ("Yasunidos Collective").
