= Hakan Taş =

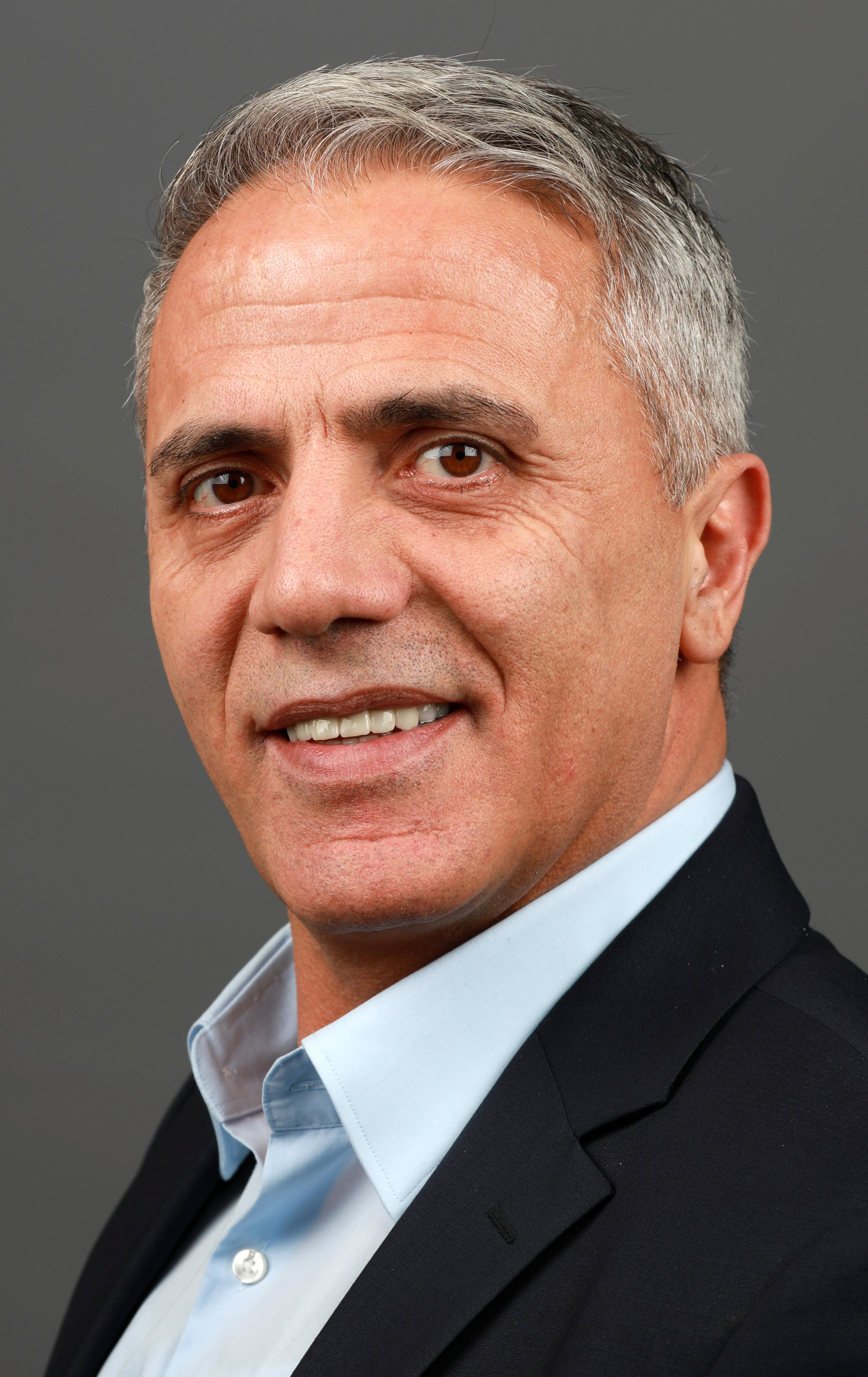
- Hakan Taş in 2017

Member, Berlin House of Representatives
- In office 2011–2021

Personal details
- Born: September 15, 1966 Kemah, Turkey
- Party: Independent politician
- Other political affiliations: Die Linke

Hakan Taş (born 15 September 1966 in Kemah) is a Turkish-German Independent politician.

== Biography ==
Hakan Taş was born in Kemah, Turkey and is of Kurdish-Alevi descent. He moved to Berlin in 1980 and has lived there since. In 1983, he completed training as a business clerk and was also active as a youth representative, works council member, and trade union board member. He later worked as a journalist and freelance writer. Politically, he was involved with the Die Linke party and particularly campaigned for the rights of immigrants. He was elected to the Berlin House of Representatives in the election held on 18 September 2011. There, Taş spoke on issues such as security, integration and participation policy and was the chairman of the Committee on Labour, Integration and Social Affairs. He openly confessed his homosexuality during the time. In the 2021 election to the Berlin House of Representatives, he was not re-elected.

In June 2024, he resigned from the Die Linke party and announced his move to the alliance led by Sahra Wagenknecht.

== Public profile ==
When the Berlin imam Abu Bilal Ismail referred to Gaza as the "land of jihad" and Jews as the "slayers of prophets" during his Friday sermon on 18 July 2014, and led a prayer calling for actions against Jews worldwide, Taş filed a complaint against him for incitement of hatred and simultaneously called on all German federal and state parliamentarians of Turkish origin to join his protest. Taş was considered a hostile target for German and Turkish right-wing extremists and therefore received police protection at times. In June 2013, runes were placed in his apartment, and he received death threats, while in December 2017 he was, according to his own account, punched in the face by a Turkish right-wing extremist.

On 15 December 2018, the Berlin police initiated investigations against Taş for drunk driving and hit-and-run, as he allegedly drove into a street light while intoxicated and then continued driving. Following this, Taş announced that he would temporarily step down from his spokesperson role and his position on the parliamentary group executive board. In August 2019, the Legal Affairs Committee of the House of Representatives lifted Taş's parliamentary immunity. In October 2019, Taş received a penalty of €5,600 (70 daily fines of €80) for his offence.
