= Moud Goba =

Zimbabwean LGBTIQ+ activist

- Born: Harare, Zimbabwe
- Organisations: Micro Rainbow International; Gay Afrika; UK Black Pride
- Awards: Attitude Pride Award (2017); BBC 100 Women (2022); BET International's Global Good Award (2023)

Moud Goba is a Zimbabwean LGBTIQ+ human rights activist. She is a refugee in the United Kingdom where she arrived as a young asylum seeker fleeing Zimbabwe after years of persecution for being a lesbian.

== Early life ==
Goba grew up in Harare, Zimbabwe. She fled the country during Robert Mugabe's regime, which saw the harassment and persecution of homosexuals. After applying for asylum in the UK, she waited two years for her request to be granted. Goba described the wait as a "time to volunteer for a number of organizations and set up my own—Gay Afrika—to help me find others like me living in the U.K."

== Activism ==
Goba is one of the founding members of UK Black Pride, a black gay pride event in London that has taken place since 2005. She is currently the chair of their board of directors.

Goba works as a project manager for Micro Rainbow International, a charity that supports homeless LGBTIQ+ people seeking asylum. Goba works to help refugees on employability skills as well as leads MRI's safe housing project, which houses 25,000 homeless LGBTIQ+ people every year. Goba focuses on refugees arriving to the UK from Afghanistan.

In 2022, Goba was part of the parade for LGBTIQ+ rights at the opening of the Commonwealth Games at the Alexander Stadium in Birmingham, England, along with five other activists and English diver Tom Daley.

For her collaboration with UK grassroot organizations in helping LGBTIQ+ refugees, Goba was included on Global Citizen's list of activists in 2023, stating that "she’s definitely a force to pay attention to in 2023".

== Awards and honors ==
In 2015, The Independent named Goba as one of the top 100 most influential LGBTIQ+ people in the UK for her experience working with LGBTIQ+ refugees.

In 2017, the LGBT magazine Attitude recognized Goba's help to other refugees by honoring her with an Attitude Pride Award.

In 2022, Goba was listed as one of the BBC's 100 Women, recognizing her contributions to LGBTIQ+ asylum seekers and refugees.

In 2023, Goba received BET International's Global Good Award for "fostering LGBTQ+ safe spaces and refugee integration in society".

In 2024, she was named among the top 100 on the Pride Power List.
