= Nadeem Kashish =

Pakistani transgender activist

- Occupations: Transgender rights activist, politician

Nadeem Kashish is a Pakistani transgender activist, politician and radio show host. She became one of the four transgender people to run for office in the 2018 Pakistan general elections.

== Personal life ==
Kashish was disowned by her family and thrown out of her home in Multan at the age of 16 because of her feminine behavior. Kashish then joined a house of Gurus, where the community of transgender people in Pakistan usually live. The Guru; the head of the house would provide food and shelter to the residents of the house. However, Kashish left the house and cut ties with the Guru, after she was forced by him in prostitution; a work that most transgender people living in these sanctuary's are bound to. Kashish then joined a television program in Islamabad as a makeup artist. From there she started working for NGOs that help the transgender community. Kashish lives in Islamabad, Pakistan.

== Career ==
In 2006, Kashish worked as a makeup artist. She then joined FM-99 as a radio show host where she highlighted the problems faced by transgender community in Pakistan.

She also started work as an activist and started her own organization "Shemale Association for Fundamental Rights (Safar). She is the president of the NGO.

In 2018, Kashish joined politics when she stood for the election campaigns.

=== Activism ===
Kashish ran a door to door campaign. Her stated goal is to improve the transgender community and fight for their rights. She also created her own transgender people's shelter in Islamabad, that houses many transgender people in the community.

Kashish is also advocating against the Guru culture in the transgender community.

Kashish was also part of a mosque construction project that is underway for the transgender community residing in slums of Islamabad.

=== 2018 elections ===
In 2018, the government of Pakistan passed a bill that allowed transgender people to determine their own gender in all official documents, obtain ID cards passports and drivers license, to vote and to not be discriminated for employment. This removed the gender criteria and Nadeem Kashish along with four other transgender activists become the first transgender to participate in general elections.

Kashish along with other transgender candidates was compensated from the election fee by the government of Pakistan. Kashish stood in elections for NA-53 in Islamabad against Shahid Khakan Abbasi and Imran Khan of PTI. She gained a total of 22 votes.

During the campaign, Kashish advocated for transgender rights and conservation of water for the next generations.
