= Jack Quillin =

American activist

Jack Donald Quillin is a convicted felon, American journalist, videographer, and digital media publisher associated with NightSunTV, an independent news and documentary platform founded in 2023. He previously operated the now-deleted account, LAScanner, on the platform X, where he published real time information derived from police and fire radio traffic in the Los Angeles area. His work with LAScanner received coverage from The Los Angeles Times during the January 2025 Southern California Wildfires.

Quillin's journalism has primarily focused on breaking news, public safety, courts, housing conditions, local politics, and community issues. In 2026, he announced NightSunTV would shift its emphasis from breaking-news reporting towards documentary journalism.

== Career ==
=== Early journalism and breaking-news work ===
According to Quillin's professional biography, his interest in breaking-news journalism developed while he was living in Los Angeles. He has stated that a police pursuit near his college apartment in 2022 prompted him to begin documenting breaking-news events.

Quillin subsequently worked as a news stringer, traveling to the scenes of breaking events to record photographs and video. The Los Angeles Times independently described Quillin in January 2025 as a stringer for a news service who regularly traveled to breaking-news scenes to record video.

In 2023, Quillin founded NightSunTV as a digital news platform. According to the outlet, its original purpose was to provide timely reporting and to keep audiences informed about developing events.

=== LAScanner ===
Quillin operated @LAScanner, an account on X that monitored police and fire radio communications and published information about developing incidents in the Los Angeles area

The Los Angeles Times identified Quillin as the operator of @LAScanner in a January 10, 2025 article examining the increasing prominence of scanner-based social-media accounts during the Southern California Wildfires.

Before the fires, accounts such as LAScanner generally reported on police pursuits, crimes in progress, fires, and other breaking incidents. During the major fires in January 2025, however, scanner accounts became a significant source of rapidly developing information for social-media users. The Times reported that @LAScanner and other prominent scanner accounts each had tens of thousands of followers.

=== ICE enforcement controversy ===
In June 2025, Quillin received national attention for operating the LAScanner account on X, which published real-time information about federal immigration enforcement activity in Los Angeles. The account shared locations of operations involving U.S. Immigration and Customs Enforcement (ICE) and information identifying federal agents. The Washington Times characterized the posts as having contributed to the online targeting of ICE personnel during protests surrounding immigration enforcement operations in Los Angeles.

On June 9, Quillin deactivated the LAScanner account after his own identifying information was circulated online. According to the Washington Times, he subsequently apologized for publishing the locations of ICE operations and stated that he would no longer do so.

The incident occurred amid a broader debate over the identification of federal immigration officers. ICE officials said agents and their families had faced doxxing and threats, while Democratic lawmakers and civil-rights advocates criticized the use of masks by immigration agents and argued that officers conducting enforcement actions should be publicly identifiable.

==== 2025 Los Angeles Wildfires ====
During the January 2025 wildfires, Quillin monitored multiple emergency-radio channels for extended periods and relayed information from firefighters and other emergency personnel.

The Los Angeles Times reported that Quillin and another scanner operator were working approximately 16 to 20 hours per day as the fires developed. Quillin told the news paper that he was sleeping two to three hours each night before returning to monitoring radio traffic.

Quillin described hearing firefighters repeatedly request additional resources wile major fires spread across the region. He told the Times that listening to reports of homes burning while firefighters struggled with limited resources was difficult.

Quillin also told the Times that messages from people who said LAScanner had helped them understand evacuation conditions, determine whether homes were still standing, or decide when to leave dangerous areas motivated him to continue operating the account during the disaster.

=== NightSunTV ===
Quillin founded NightSunTV in 2023. The outlet initially concentrated heavily on breaking news and public-safety reporting.

NightSunTV's published archive identifies Quillin as the author of numerous stories covering crime, police investigations, courts, housing conditions, political disputes, community activism, and other Houston-area issues.

Among his reporting has been coverage of shootings, fatal traffic crashes, robberies, police investigations, judicial disputes, housing complaints, elections and political controversies.

NightSunTV's reporting expanded during 2026 to include greater coverage of courts, government accountability, housing, and political disputes. Its archive shows Quillin publishing reports involving judicial complaints, apartment conditions, local elections, child custody disputes, political organizations, and community activists.

==== Transition to Documentary-Journalism ====
In July 2026, Quillin announced that NightSunTV would transition from primarily breaking-news coverage toward documentary journalism,

In announcing the change, Quillin wrote that some stories could not adequately be covered through short breaking-news updates and instead required additional investigation, context, and examination of multiple perspectives.

NightSunTV stated that its documentary work would focus on subjects including public safety, housing, government accountability, social issues, and individual community experiences. The outlet described its intended approach as combining journalism with cinematic documentary production,

The transition represented a shift from the rapid reporting that characterized Quillin's earlier work with LAScanner and NightSunTV toward longer-form reporting intended to examine the circumstances and broader issues underlying individual news events.
