= C. D. Kirven =

American LGBTQ rights activist

Chastity D. Kirven, known as C. D. Kirven is a community organizer, human rights activist, writer, artist, filmmaker, comic book creator, feminist and outspoken LGBT rights activist. Kirven spoke at the Supreme Court during the oral arguments for the Defense of Marriage Act and Proposition 8 on March 27, 2013, which was attended by over 10,000 people.

== Early life and education ==
Kirven was born in Waco and raised in Dallas, Texas. At the age of 16, Kirven wrote an article about corporal punishment which reached the Associated Press wire, raising awareness and generating sufficient interest to help restrict its use in Texas public schools. Kirven graduated from Texas Woman's University with a bachelor's degree in communications and was voted LGBT rights activist of the year by the Dallas Voice in 2012.

== Career ==
Kirven was a founding member of several LGBT non-profit organizations, including Get Equal Now and DFW Pride Movement. Kirven was a Get Equal Now board member, and was one of the ENDA Four who were arrested in Speaker Nancy Pelosi's office in March 2010. In addition, Kirven produced and directed the first LGBT cell phone documentary short called, The Dark Side of the Rainbow: The Price of Inequality.

Kirven has spoken at LGBT political rallies across the country and was a community organizer for the Legacy of Success Foundation, where she chaired several non-profit events. One such event was One Man's Trash is Another Man's Dinner, which raised money for a food pantry program that fed over 3,000 low-income people living with HIV-AIDS. Kirven was a contributing writer for several news organizations, including The Dallas Morning News, The Huffington Post, Bilerico, The Dallas Voice, Cherrygrrl, and Telemundo. Kirven wrote her first novel called What Goes Around Comes Back Around in 2008. It was nominated for the Lambda Literary Award.

In October 2012 Kirven, working with John Dean Domingue, facilitated LGBT rights training at the Regional Project for Europe, which included 17 LGBT leaders. The project was coordinated by the Dallas World Affairs Council's International Visitor Program (IVLP) and the U.S. State Department's professional exchange program. The IVLP] works with an extensive team of local volunteers, businesses and community leaders.

Kirven and other members of Get Equal Now protested Exxon for its anti-LGBT stance. Kirven continued protesting until Exxon changed its health benefits to include LGBT families in 2015. Kirven has held protests for the inclusion of LGBT families in both the City of Dallas and Dallas County health benefit packages. Kirven held several rallies protesting California's Proposition 8 ruling and Defense of Marriage Act.

Kirven created the first black lesbian superhero comic book series called The Tao Diaries. Kirven has traveled to several comic book conventions across the country and was featured at Stan Lee's ComiKasz Convention in Los Angeles, in 2012. Kirven is an artist and has been featured in several art shows.

Kirven has spoken and organized several pro-choice rallies across Texas in protest of Texas Senate Bill 5. Kirven is also active in the Texas Civil Rights community, and has spoken at several Black Lives Matter rallies across the country. Kirven is featured in the documentary From Selma to Stonewall, directed by lesbian filmmaker Marilyn Bennett.
