= Maki Muraki =

- Born: Maki Muraki; 1974 (age 51–52)
- Education: Kyoto University
- Occupation: LGBT activist

Maki Muraki (村木 真紀, Muraki Maki; born 1974) is a Japanese LGBTQ activist. She is the head of the Osaka-based Japanese LGBT rights organization, Nijiiro ("Rainbow") Diversity. Through lectures and media appearances, she is an advocate for gay-friendly policies in office environments in Japanese companies and society.

== Career ==
Muraki, a lesbian, is a graduate of Kyoto University.

Muraki emphasizes that LGBT employees in Japan may experience discomfort about their environment that could pressure them to change careers, or experience depression and fatigue. She advocates for more LGBT-friendly office policies, such as a restriction on anti-LGBT statements and hotlines to offer support to LGBT employees. She has also encouraged Japan to adopt anti-discrimination laws, improve gay representation in the media, and to allow gays to marry.

Today, she gives presentations to corporations and government offices on the equal treatment of gay and lesbians in workplace environments. She is the author of the "LGBT Workplace Handbook" and "Introduction to LGBT in the workplace." Her organization, Nijiiro Diversity, received a Google Impact Challenge grant in 2015.
