= Ian Bermúdez Raventós =

- Born: 1979 (age 46–47); Sant Sadurní d'Anoia, Spain
- Occupations: Philologist; Comic book writer; Translator; Poet; Trans* activist
- Website: ianbermudez.com

Ian Bermúdez Raventós (Born 1979, in Sant Sadurní d'Anoia, Spain) is a Spanish philologist, author, translator, poet and trans* activist.

== Biography ==
Raventos was born in Sant Sadurní d'Anoia, in Barcelona in 1979. They graduated college in English Philology with a master's degree in translation and interpretation. Raventos works as an English and literacy teacher in an adult school.

Raventos has translated many works from English into Spanish including Daniel Goleman's Ecoliterate and was a member of the translation teams on Trans Politics: An Anthology of Texts from North American Trans Studies, Unveiling the Mysteries of Birth and Death, Buddhist Wisdom for the Life by Japanese new religious leader Daisaku Ikeda and Terra de Ningú: Feminist Perspectives on Independence.

In 2015, Raventos published a series of poems titled Ser h(u)ome*(à), an educational project meant to spark discussion and curiosity about trans identity. Raventos also wrote two graphic novels Transito, in 2015, illustrated by David Cantero and Transitem, in 2021, illustrated by Lucía de Palau. They focus on trans identity and the path towards happiness in any shape or form.

Since 2017, Raventos has lived in Cunit in Tarragona and runs bibliotherapy and creativity workshops and contributes to the local Radio Cunit in the form of novel reading program, Me la llegeixes?

Raventos has been a coordinator of DebuT* a creative laboratory founded by screenwriter and director Ian de la Rosa focused on training and creativity based around exploration of gender and identity active in the Sala Beckett theatre.

They have contributed to the Lambda magazine, the oldest LGBTQ publication in Spain, since 2017. Raventos has also participated in the writing of ¿Seguro que no passa nada? Reflexiones de una mare activista pro LGTBI (Are you sure that nothing happens? Reflections of a pro-LGTBI activist mare) by Pepa Nolla.

In 2025, they presented, in collaboration with drag king Leo Chakras, Toca'm a les fosques (Touch me in the dark), a compilation of erotic stories about trans men.

== Publications ==
=== Books ===
- Ser h(u)ome*(à) (Edicions Bellaterra, 2015)
- Are you sure that nothing happens? Reflections of a pro-LGTBI activist mare (Edicions Bellaterra, 2021) with Pepa Nolla
- Touch me in the dark (Vincle Editorial, 2025)

=== Translations ===
- Trans Politics: An Anthology of Texts from North American Trans Studies (Egales, 2015)
- Unveiling the Mysteries of Birth and Death, Buddhist Wisdom for the Life (Ediciones Civilitzacion Global, 2015)
- Terra de Ningú: Feminist Perspectives on Independence (Pol·len edicions, 2017)

=== Comics ===
- TRANSito (Edicions Bellaterra, 1 de diciembre de 2015)
- Transitem / Transitamos (Pol·len Edicions/Pol·len, 2021)
