= Mikhail Tumasov =

Mikhail "Misha" Tumasov is a Russian LGBTQ activist and human rights defender. Tumasov founded the Avers LGBT movement in Samara in 2011 and is currently the network director for the Russian LGBT Network.

Born in 1975, Tumasov comes from Astrachan, a city in southern Russia. He moved to Samara when he was in his mid-twenties, where he lived a quiet life together with his partner, Denis, and worked as a sales and distribution manager for local media companies. He met Denis in 2005, and they have been together ever since.

Mikhail's activism began in 2011, when he decided he needed to speak out in protest against the anti-gay propaganda legislation that was spreading across Russia. He collected signatures protesting against the 'Milonov law', which bans so-called 'propaganda' of homosexuality, that had just been passed in St Petersburg, and eventually founded the 'Avers LGBT Movement'. Avers is a social regional movement aimed at protecting human rights and freedoms, developing civil society institutions, fighting against discrimination, defamation and violation of human rights based on sexual orientation and gender identity. The movement also promotes gender equality in the society and deals with socially dangerous diseases prevention. After Samara passed its anti-gay propaganda law the following year, Tumasov and several others sued to overturn it, but were unsuccessful. Despite the regional and federal laws, Avers has continued to organize events, including discussions and seminars on emotional and legal topics.

In April 2012, Tumasov was violently assaulted after coming out to a recent acquaintance. He reported the incident to the police, but nothing came of the complaint. The magistrate threw it out for being incorrectly formulated and asked for it to be redone, but the deadline passed while Mikhail was in the hospital recovering from the concussion and other injuries he had received.

In 2014, Tumasov moved to St. Petersburg with his partner to work at the Interregional Movement of the Russian LGBT (MRLGBT) Network. His colleague, Oksana Berezovskaya, now leads Avers.
