= Quiteria Franco =

Venezuelan LGBT activist

Quiteria Josefina Franco Coronado is a Venezuelan LGBT activist and researcher. Since 2014, she has been General Coordinator of Affirmative Action of Venezuela (UNAF) and of the LGBTI Network of Venezuela. She has been part of the Civil Society Advisory Group of UN Women in Latin America and the Caribbean since January 2018.

== Education and career ==
She earned a licentiate (tertiary degree) in education, with a focus on modern languages, from the University of Zulia in 1996, obtained a diploma (graduate degree) in translation from the Metropolitan University in Caracas in 2004, and graduated with a master's degree (postgraduate) in applied linguistics from Simón Bolívar University in 2013. Her thesis was titled Practical analysis of the spoken insult in the "Los Fabulosos" [the Fabulous Ones] segment of the program, "¡A qué te Ríes!" [What are you laughing at!] (In Spanish, Análisis pragmático del acto de habla del insulto en el segmento "Los fabulosos" del programa “¡A que te ríes!”).

She has been a professor at Simón Bolívar University since 1999. Her academic work focuses on analyzing the role of language in communication, discrimination, and violence. She has engaged in the research and defense of same sex marriage in Venezuela, as well as legal changes of name and gender. She also works as a Spanish-English translator and interpreter.

=== LGBTI activism ===
In February 2014, she assumed the coordination of the civil association Affirmative Union of Venezuela, an organization founded in 2000. She has also been a member of the LGBTI Network of Venezuela, of the Red Naranja (Orange Network), and of the International Lesbian and Gay Association-ILGA. In August 2014 she was elected coordinator-general of the LGBTI Network of Venezuela for the 2014―2016 term. In 2015, she presented a report of the situation of LGBTI people in Venezuela to the Inter-American Commission on Human Rights as representative of the LGBTI Network of Venezuela. She has presented similar reports afterward in different commissions of the United Nations, and has conducted training for journalists and for both public and private institutions in Venezuela about the topic.

In January 2018, she was chosen to be one of four new members of the Civil Society Advisory Group for UN Women for Latin America and the Caribbean after a selection of nearly 200 candidacies, along with Waldistrudis Hurtado (Colombia), Marilyn Ramón Medellín (Mexico) and Gia Gaspard Taylor (Trinidad and Tobago). On 8 March 2018, the Internal Policy Commission of the National Assembly of Venezuela made an official Act of Recognition of her work.

== See also ==
- Recognition of same-sex unions in Venezuela
- LGBT rights in Venezuela
