= Jean Chong =

Singaporean LGBT rights activist

- Born: Jean Chong
- Occupation: LGBT activist

Jean Chong is a Singaporean LGBT rights activist. She co-founded Sayoni, an LGBT rights organization, and serves as one of the leaders of the ASEAN Sexual Orientation, Gender Identity and Gender Expression Caucus, an activist collective. Chong holds a master's degree in Human Rights and Democratization.

== Life and work ==
Chong was raised in Singapore. Growing up as a lesbian, she "always wished there were lesbian role models." She first started in her activism by volunteering with a gay Christian support network, Safehaven, and became their first female vice chairperson. Subsequently, she co-founded an inclusive church, Free (First Realize Everyone is Equal) Community Church and served as their chairperson. Looking to expand her horizons in helping others, she went on to be a part of the core team of an LGBT federation, People Like Us in Singapore. She is also currently a part of the ASEAN SOGIE Caucus, a regional network of South East Asia LGBTIQ groups lobbying for the inclusion of LGBTIQ rights in the ASEAN Human Rights Mechanism.
