= Lee Gye-deok =

South Korean singer and activist

- Born: 20 November 1986
- Other names: First Gay Riot Policeman in Korea
- Occupations: LGBT social movements activist, former policeman, singer

- Lee Gye-deok
- Hangul: 이계덕
- RR: I Gyedeok
- MR: I Kyedŏk

Lee Gye-deok (Korean: 이계덕, born 20 November 1986) is a South Korean singer and activist for civil and human rights activist who promotes LGBT rights, typically for gay rights.

== Political career ==
Lee was elected as a non-adult representative of the Democratic Labor Party of Korea and attracted a great deal of attention from the public, because that was the first case a youth was elected as a representative for a party. He resigned from his post due to his frustrations on the reality of the political field in Korea.

== Gay riot police officer and singer for promoting LGBT rights ==
Lee was a riot police officer at Yongsan Police Station and the first Korean riot policeman who came out as gay.

As he continually called for dismantling of the Korean riot police, the Korean National Police Agency filed for a warrant for his arrest after reports he tried to touch the body parts of 13 colleagues without their permission. However, he believed this was done in revenge, because Lee drew public attention when he came out of the closet earlier this year. He recently filed for a transfer saying the environment did not fit his work and political ethics. The Ministry of Defense of Korea has reportedly turned down the transfer request.

Even though Lee was a policeman, he criticized the National Police in his song, the Seoul Central District Court has ruled that he is free to do so.

He was dismissed as a riot policeman after three years of legal disputes with the agency.

== Promoting gay awareness advertisements ==
Lee petitioned for an ad to be posted on Gyodae Station's electronic banners that said "Anyone amongst Seoul's citizens may be a sexual minority. All citizens have the right to not be discriminated against their sexual orientation." He paid for it with 3 million won out of his own pocket.

Eunpyoung, Yongsan, Gwangjin, Geumcheon, Joonggu, Jongro Districts allowed the advertisement campaigns, but Seocho District rejected his advertisements and he said it was "discrimination without reason" and advised them to "find a way to prevent ads are not refused just because the subject matter is about homosexuality or other sexual orientations." They revealed that "Even if a few members of society who hold hatred and prejudices against homosexuality send in complaints about an ad about gay awareness, the national and regional government has an obligation to protect and form a social consensus so that social minorities do not become the target of unfair discrimination and oppression.".
