= Leonne Zeegers =

Dutch intersex person

- Born: Leonarda Josefina Maria Zeegers; March 1, 1961 (age 65); Swalmen, Limburg
- Known for: Gender-neutrality

Leonarda Josefina Maria Zeegers, known as Leonne Zeegers (born 1 March 1961 in Swalmen) is the first person in the Netherlands whose legal sex in the Personal Records Database (Basisregistratie Personen) and passport was changed to an "X" (for gender-neutral). The change took effect on 19 October 2018, and in the same month, they became the first adult Dutch citizen to receive a passport bearing an "X" in the sex designation field. Earlier in May 2018, Zeegers first attracted national attention when a district court in Limburg ruled that the sex designation in their birth certificate could be modified to indicate a person whose sex could not be determined at birth. Zeegers is intersex and non-binary, and has no preference regarding personal pronouns.

== Biography ==
Leonne Zeegers was born on a farm in Swalmen in the Dutch province of Limburg. At birth, Zeegers was found to be intersex, and had both male and female primary sex characteristics. This was not an unfamiliar phenomenon for Zeegers' parents, since calves and goats with similar variations in sex characteristics were occasionally born on the farm. Their parents decided to register them with the civil registry as a boy under the name Leon. As a child, they already felt more like a girl than a boy. During puberty, they did not develop male secondary sex characteristics, but instead developed breasts. They eventually underwent a double mastectomy, later married a woman, and had a son.

=== Gender neutrality ===
In 2001, Zeegers underwent several surgeries to physically transition to female, and began taking female sex hormones. They changed their name to Leonne, and officially changed their legal sex to female.

However, around the age of 55, Zeegers decided that they no longer wished to choose between being male or female. As a result, they encountered several problems with municipal authorities, who, due to the absence of the appropriate registration data, suspended their welfare benefits.

After a legal case lasting two years, the District Court of Roermond ruled that the sex designation on their birth certificate could be changed to gender-neutral. The court noted that the European Convention on Human Rights states that there must be a reasonable balance between the interests of society and those of the individual. The judge concluded that, in this case, the right to self-determination and personal autonomy outweighed the general interest, which essentially consisted of strict compliance with the law.

In October 2018, Zeegers became the first adult Dutch citizen to receive a passport bearing an "X" (for gender-neutral) in the sex designation field. Zeegers is non-binary, and has no preference regarding personal pronouns, and do not consider either he/him or she/her pronouns offensive.

Following the court ruling, the State Secretary for the Interior, Raymond Knops, stated that he wanted to make gender-neutral registration legally possible. In 2019, however, he postponed legislative action and declared that he wished to await international developments before proceeding. In 2019, following a motion introduced by Democrats 66, a study was launched into the possibilities of abolishing mandatory sex registration.
