= Sub Rang Society =

NGO in Karachi, Pakistan

Sub Rung Society is a non-profit organisation working for advocacy, awareness, and employment of the Pakistani transgender community. The organization is opening trans-led salons through the economic project 'Trawah'. Trawah is a code word within the trans-community, which means makeup. Under this project, they have launched a salon in Karachi. The salon has both transgender and non-transgender employees. The organization also collaborates as a local partner for organizing International Minorities Festival in Pakistan.
