= Kristian Ranđelović =

Intersex transgender activist

Kristian Ranđelović is an activist for LGBTI+ rights in the Balkan region, focusing on the rights of transgender and intersex people. Ranđelović has developed the first transgender support group in the Balkans. He is one of the co-founders of the Belgrade-based organization XY Spectrum, which tackles issues of intersex, trans and non-binary persons. Ranđelović himself is transgender and intersex.

== Career ==
Ranđelović is a psychodrama trainer and TV and film editor. Before engaging in different initiatives as an activist, he was asked by a medical professional to participate in the first television show in Serbia in the 1990s, which heightened his notability and expertise in the region.

In 2006, Ranđelović worked with Gayten-LGBT in Belgrade. During this period, he worked with others to develop programming for transgender individuals, including creation of the first transgender support group in the Balkans. Ranđelović was still the facilitator for this group in 2015. During his career, Ranđelović has also participated in the creation of the first trans website named Trans Serbia in the Balkan region.

From 2010-2012 Kristian was involved with ILGA Europe as a board member. He held the same position as board member in the organization Transgender Europe during the period of 2010-2016 and at OII Europe for the period 2015-2017.

== Selected bibliography ==
- Ranđelović, Kristian (2018). "Intersex Research Study: Albania, Bosnia and Herzegovina, The Former Yugoslav Republic of Macedonia, and Serbia 2017" (PDF). UNDP. Archived from the original (PDF) on 2018-09-01.
