= Amara Ogara =

Nigerian LGBTQ rights activist and filmmaker

- Born: Nigeria
- Other name: Amara the Lesbian
- Citizenship: Nigerian
- Occupations: LGBTQ rights activist, filmmaker, content creator
- Years active: 2010s–present
- Known for: LGBTQ rights advocacy, filmmaking and social media activism

Amara Ogara, popularly known as Amara the Lesbian, is a Nigerian LGBTQ rights activist, filmmaker, content creator and social media personality. She is known for her advocacy on LGBTQ rights in Nigeria, her online educational content, and her work promoting the visibility of sexual minorities in the country.

== Personal life ==
Ogara has publicly discussed her sexuality and experiences as a lesbian woman in Nigeria. She and her partner Olayinka received international media attention after announcing a symbolic marriage commitment, which they described as an affirmation of their relationship despite the legal restrictions on same-sex marriage in Nigeria.

== Career and activism ==
Ogara became known through her public advocacy on issues affecting LGBTQ people in Nigeria. Through social media, interviews and community engagement, she has spoken about discrimination, social exclusion and the challenges faced by sexual minorities in the country.

During the 2020 #EndSARS protests, Ogara stated that she was assaulted and threatened while participating in demonstrations. She repeatedly spoke publicly about the experiences of LGBTQ Nigerians within wider social justice movements.

Ogara has also used her public platforms to discuss housing discrimination and other challenges faced by LGBTQ people in Nigeria.

== Filmmaking ==
In addition to her activism, Ogara works as a filmmaker and content creator. Her projects focus on identity, relationships and the experiences of LGBTQ individuals in Nigerian society.

She is the creator of This Is Not You, a film inspired by experiences from a long-term relationship. In an interview, she explained that the project drew inspiration from her personal experiences and decided to tell stories that are often less represented in Nigerian media.

== Media appearances ==
Ogara was featured in the documentary Defiance: Voices of a New Generation, which explores the experiences of LGBTQ Nigerians and highlights the challenges faced by the community in a restrictive social and legal environment.

The documentary brought together activists, storytellers and community members to discuss identity, resilience and advocacy in contemporary Nigeria.
