= Feliciano Reyna =

Venezuelan businessman (born 1955)

Feliciano Reyna (born 2 December 1955), is the founder of Acción Solidaria. He is known for his work fighting AIDS in Venezuela.

== Life ==
Following the death of his partner from AIDS in 1994, Reyna began battling the AIDS epidemic. He started a pilot AIDS community center in Caracas, which led to a network of centers in Venezuela. These centers offer AIDS education, prevention, and care. Acción Solidaria has trained over 300 educators.

In 2006, Reyna was a finalist for the Red Ribbon Award at the International AIDS Conference in Toronto.

Reyna's approach emphasizes the importance of education in AIDS care and prevention.

In 2002, Reyna was elected an Ashoka Fellow.
