= António Serzedelo =

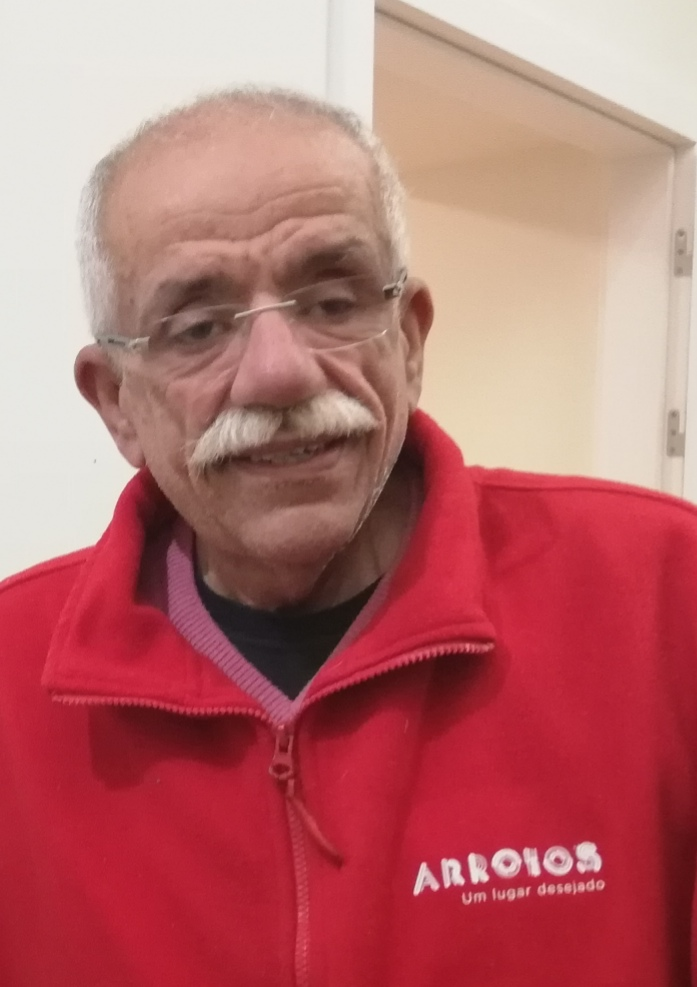
- at Arroios Parish Council, by Rrts 2020
- Born: António José Serzedelo Silva Marques; 15 May 1945 (age 81); Lisbon
- Notable work: "Freedom for the Sexual Minorities"

António José Serzedelo Silva Marques (Lisbon, 15 May 1945) is a Portuguese human rights activist, radio broadcaster, actor and a scholar. He is the oldest live LGBTI activist in Portugal (since May 1974). He was the author of the 1st LBGTI Manifesto in Portugal, "Freedom for the Sexual Minorities". He is the founder of Opus Gay, of which he was president for many years. He also founded and hosts a radio programme called Vidas Alternativas (Alternative Lives).

== Biography ==
=== Academic Studies ===
Serzedelo attended secondary school in Lourenço Marques (now Maputo), Mozambique and later graduated from the Faculty of Arts, University of Lisbon with a degree in History.

=== Activism ===
Just 8 days after the Carnation Revolution, Serzedelo co-authored the manifesto "Freedom for the Sexual Minorities", which was written by the newly established "Homosexual Movement for the Revolutionary Action" and published on 13 May 1974 in the daily newspapers Diário de Lisboa and Diário de Notícias. It is considered the foundational document for the LGBTI cause in Portugal and had great repercussions at that time. From that point on, Serzedelo became involved in various causes and organizations, although he is still best known for his role in the LGBTI cause.

Between 1982 and 1992, he was the President for the Human Rights Portuguese Committee for the Palestinians. He was also a member of the Peace and Cooperation Council for the Anti-Apartheid Movement in Portugal until the end of the Apartheid in the Republic of South Africa and Rhodesia. In 1995, he got involved with "The Engravings Don't Know how to Swim" movement with the archaeologist Mila Simões de Abreu and Isabel do Carmo, which aimed to save the Côa Engravings, which were listed as World Heritage by UNESCO. He is one of the co-founders of the Abril Association along with several former-pintassilguistas (Pintassilgo's supporters).

On 28 June 1997 Serzedelo founded the Opus Gay Association, whose goal was to defend the human rights of sexual minorities. With the support of the Commission for Citizenship and Gender Equality and within the scope of the National Strategic Reference Framework, Serzedelo created an extension of Opus Gay against domestic violence and homophobia in Évora.

He is a member of the Association Republic and Secularism. He was a member of the Portuguese Social Forum. He founded and was a board member of the Portas Abertas Association – Servas Portugal, national representative for the federation Servas International, a network of hosts and travellers whose goal is to promote world peace. He is also co-founder of the Association "Men against Violence" and current member.

He signed a public petition, along with another 200 public personalities, against mistreatment of animals and in favour of the sterilisation of cats and dogs with, which was submitted to the Government. He was subsequently involved in the ministerial negotiations to implement this initiative.

Serzedelo was involved in the fight against pedophilia in Lisbon. He was an activist for the campaign in favour of the Right to Abortion in the Portuguese abortion referendum, 2007, along with several other civic associations.

In 2017, Serzedelo, along with the Municipality of Lisbon, placed an anti-homophobia monument in the Príncipe Real Garden, one of the central gardens of Lisbon.

=== Journalism ===
In 1974, Serzedelo completed his internship at the Centre de formation des journalistes from Le Monde, Paris, in 1974. In 1975 he was an intern at the Portuguese Diário de Notícias. Later on he became was the administrator and journalist for the weekly newspaper "O Ponto". He was also a correspondent in Lisbon for the Parisian Community Radio "Rádio Clube Português de Paris", until its closure.

In 1999, Serzedelo founded the radio programme "Vidas Alternativas", which was the first programme in Portugal to discuss LGBTI issues. It was initially broadcast on Voxx radio and aired on several university and local radios throughout the country. Nowadays the program is broadcast online at the MegaWeb website. Recently he created the programme Vidas Alternativas Brasil, in order to reach the Brazilian audience.

Serzedelo also co-founded of the independent blogs such as the "Forum Social Português" and "Sociofonia".

He regularly gives interviews for newspapers, magazines, radios, local and national TV, speaking about subjects such as the fight against homophobia, discrimination, equality, non-marital partnerships, same sex marriage, adoption, right to abortion and other civic movements.

=== Politics ===
He was part of General Franco Charais office, who was a member of the Revolution Council. Serzedelo remained in office until the council was dissolved. Currently he is the substitute councilman for the Portuguese Socialist Party in the Lisbon City Council, elected in the last municipal elections.

=== Teaching ===
Serzedelo was a professor at Dom José I Secondary School, in Lisbon and a coordinator of a teacher trainee program for the Faculdade de Letras da Universidade de Lisboa and Universidade Lusíada de Lisboa.

=== Arts ===
He is an active member of the cinema cooperative called "Cinequipa".

== See also ==
- LGBT rights in Portugal
