= Barış Sulu =

Turkish politician

Barış Sulu is a Turkish politician from the Peoples' Democratic Party (HDP). Sulu is the first openly gay parliamentary candidate in Turkey.

However, he wasn't elected to parliament. He has been an LGBT rights activist in Turkey since 1999, though he is currently a refugee in Germany.
