= Ali Feruz =

Uzbekistani journalist

- Born: Khudoberdi Nurmatov; Gorno-Altaysk, Russian SFSR or Kokand, Uzbek SSR
- Citizenship: Soviet Union (1987–1991); Russia (1991–Present); Uzbekistan (2004–Present)
- Occupation: Journalist

Ali Feruz (Russian: Али Феруз) is a dual citizen of Russia and Uzbekistan, journalist and activist who worked at Novaya Gazeta.

== Biography ==
Ali Feruz was born in the USSR, where he spent his childhood in the Altai region of the Russia. He is a citizen of the Russian Federation (formerly USSR) upon his birth on jus sanguinis principle. He moved to Uzbekistan to join his stepfather at the age of 17, and he also became a national of the Uzbekistan.

At some point in 2009, he was detained and tortured by the Uzbek National Security Service, who were seeking to force him to become an informer. Feruz fled from Uzbekistan in 2009 and eventually resettled in Russia in 2011. He filed for asylum in Russia, but in October 2017 Russia rejected the latest of his asylum claims.

Since 2014, he has been reporting on hate crimes, migrant workers' rights, LGBTQ-related issues for Novaya Gazeta. Due to his knowledge of several languages (including those spoken by major groups of migrant workers in Russia), Feruz is able to have a first-person perspective on these topics, resulting in unique journalistic work.

On August 2, 2017, Feruz was arrested near the office of Novaya Gazeta, and was escorted to a police precinct. On the same day, he was put before the judge in Basmanniy Court, which ordered his deportation to Uzbekistan. It was reported that, after the deportation decision, he attempted to commit suicide, which was prevented by the guards. After the court decision, Feruz's lawyer appealed to the European Court of Human Rights, which issued an injunction requesting to stop Ali Feruz's deportation while the case is being discussed.

On November 21, 2017, Basmanniy court fined Feruz for 5,000 rubles, and ordered his deportation to Uzbekistan for illegal labor activity in Russia. The deportation to Uzbekistan was suspended until the EHCR reviews the journalist's case.

== Awards ==
In 2017, Feruz was presented with Award of Courage named after Andrei Sakharov.
