= Evgeny Belyakov =

Russian human rights activist (1987–2025)

- Евгений Юрьевич Беляков
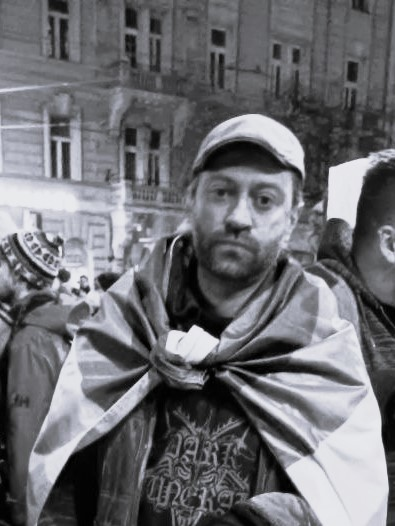
- Evgeny Belyakov at the protests in Budapest, March 18, 2025
- Born: 1987; Vladivostok, Russia
- Died: 2025 (aged 37–38); Budapest, Hungary
- Occupation: human rights activist
- Organizations: Human Rights Watch

Academic background
- Education: Central European University (CEU)
- Thesis: The Problems of Dissent and Jewish Emigration in Soviet–US Détente (1968–1975) (2010)

Evgeny Belyakov (1987-2025) was a Russian-Hungarian human rights activist.

He published articles criticizing the Putin regime, was an LGBT+ rights activist, protested against the Russian invasion of Ukraine, worked at the Front Line Defenders and Human Rights Watch.

== Life ==
Evgeny Yuryevich Belyakov was born in 1987 in Vladivostok, Russia.

His first visit to Hungary was in 2008, when Belyakov enrolled at the Central European University (CEU). His master’s thesis focused on the relationship between Jewish culture and politics in Soviet times. After earning a MA degree in comparative history of Central, Eastern and South-Eastern Europe from CEU in 2012, he worked with rights organizations in Ireland and the Czech Republic. During this period, according to Belyakov, the FSB attempted to recruit him as an informer.

In 2014–2015, Belyakov was based in Moscow, Russia, as part of Human Rights Watch. He was prosecuted for participating in 2014 anti-war protests in Russia.

He briefly worked at Novaya Gazeta.

Belyakov had been living in Hungary since 2017. When the Hungarian government took a number of measures against CEU, he also took part in protests in support of the university.

In 2022, he encountered problems renewing his residence permit in Hungary and sought help from the Hungarian Helsinki Committee. In January 2023, The National Directorate General for Aliens Policing (OIF) sought to deport Belyakov from Hungary, but the Administrative Chamber of the Metropolitan Court annulled an expulsion order against him, citing the risk of inhuman or degrading treatment and possible conscription if returned to Russia.

During his time in Hungary, Belyakov opposed the Hungarian government's policy of restricting LGBT rights, comparing it to that of Russia. In 2025, he opposed attempts to ban Budapest Pride.

Since April 2025, Belyakov was working as a staff member at the CEU Democracy Institute.

He died in Budapest, Hungary, in July 2025.
