= Romana Schlesinger =

Slovak LGBT rights activist (born 1986)

- Born: 28 July 1986 (age 40); Trenčín, Czechoslovakia
- Education: Comenius University
- Years active: 2009–2017
- Known for: LGBT rights activism

Romana Schlesinger (born 28 July 1986) is a Slovak LGBT rights activist. Between 2010 and 2017 she was the main organizer of the annual Bratislava Pride march.

== Biography ==
Romana Schlesinger was born on 28 July 1986 in Trenčín in a family of Jewish origin. Her ancestors were Holocaust survivors. She has self-identified as lesbian from the age of 16. In her youth, she faced bullying due to her Jewish origin, which had made her hide her sexual orientation.

Schlesinger studied journalism at the Comenius University, graduating in 2010. As a student she became a leading figure of the LGBT activist organizations Queer Leaders Forum and Q-centrum. In 2010 she became the chief organizer and spokesperson of the Bratislava pride march and one of the most outspoken defenders of LGBT rights in the Slovak public sphere.

In 2013 Schlesinger was approached by the Member of the National Council of Slovakia Martin Poliačik with an offer to join his Freedom and Solidarity party, which at the time aimed to portrait itself as a champion of civil rights. Although she turned down the initial offer, she eventually decided to join the party in the summer of 2014. Nonetheless, in 2015 she left the party over her disagreement over nationalistic rhetoric of the party leader Richard Sulík in the 2015 European migrant crisis and her conviction that the party might sacrifice the civil rights agenda to enable cooperation with conservative parties after the elections.

In 2015 Schlesinger was among the most outspoken opponents of the unsuccessful effort of conservative organizations to enshrine the ban of same-sex marriage in the constitution through a referendum.

As one of the most visible LGBT rights activists, Schlesinger became a target of hate speech and threats from anti-LGBT rights groups and individuals. Schlesinger cited this pressure and the associated mental stress as a reason for abandoning activism and withdrawing from public life in 2019.

=== Personal life ===
Schlesinger practices Buddhism.
