= Sonja Sajzor =

Trans feminist and queer icon

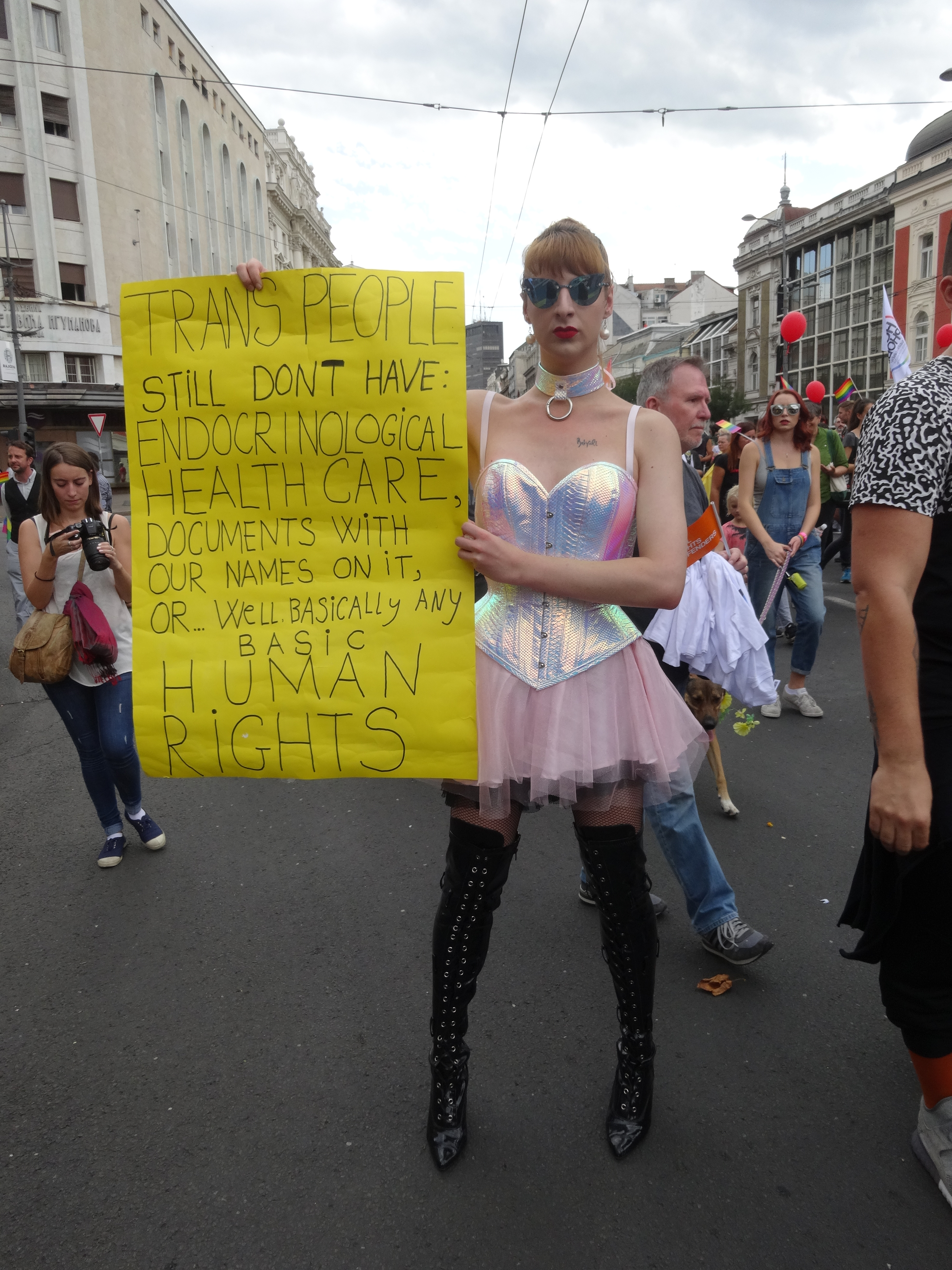
Sonja Sajzor during Belgrade Pride 2017

Sonja Sajzor (born 26 January 1993) is a DJ, darkwave singer, songwriter, visual artist, and a queer icon in Serbia.

== Early life ==
Sajzor grew up in Šabac, a small western town of Serbia which is regarded as "conservative" towards LGBT rights. Sonja then moved in with a man in Belgrade, where she was constantly networking to join the LGBTIQ+ scene in Belgrade. After four months of stay in Serbia, she and her boyfriend were attacked. Hence, she returned home and re-enrolled in high-school, where she faced severe depression.

== Professional career ==
Sajzor became one of the first two drag queens in Serbia, while she was debuting on social media. She started to document her transition through photography and by exhibiting art in online platforms to demonstrate the power of networking on the internet. The photos present the process of gender searching of Sonja, from mid teens to early twenties.

In March 2014, Sajzor was discovered by Croatian singer Ida Prester who hired her as a video vixen in her music video for ‘’U Tvojoj Glavi’’. After gaining more popularity, Sonja settled down in Belgrade and worked as a bartender. In July 2015, she founded The Tronic Lab, an artistic collective which aims to promote queer performers and drag queen culture. They are usually held in Drugstore club in Belgrade.

== Music ==
She lists Siouxsie Sioux, Nina Hagen, Lydia Lunch, and Lene Lovich – "70s and 80s goth punk women" – as her influences. At the age of 13, Sonja watched the performance of Scissor Sisters, who were playing at Exit festival, on TV. Since then, she felt the urge to start doing drag. As a singer, her lyricism is based upon heartbreak and unfulfilled love story.

Sonja has delved into electronic music since at a young age. She is a DJ and her sound bounds together different music genres like dark witch-house, electronic indie music and cyber pop culture. At the end of 2018, she released her debut album "Prudence". Sonja is the author of all the lyrics on the album while artpop duo Ensh participated in the music production.

== Discography ==
=== Albums ===
- Prudence (2018)
- Nocturnal (2019)

=== Singles ===
- Heartbroken ft. Ensh (2017)
- Loner's Lament (2017)
- Fragile Blues (2018)
- All Hell Breaks Loose (2018)
