= Delfina Martínez =

Uruguayan activist

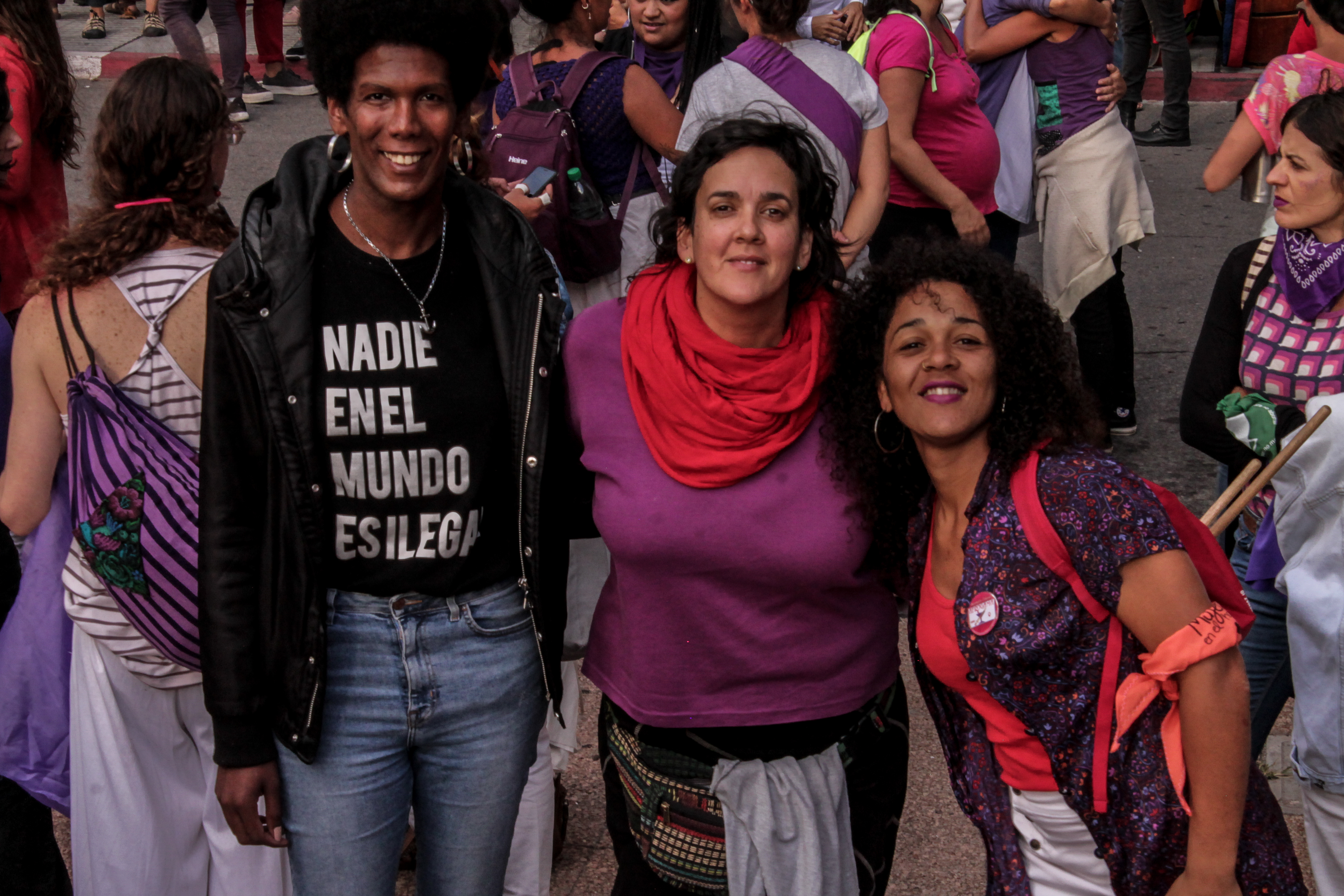
- Delfina Martínez (on the left) at a march in 2019.
- Occupation: LGBT activist
- Known for: Work to recognize and maintain transgender rights in Uruguay

Delfina Martínez is a Uruguayan LGBT activist. Martínez works to recognize and maintain transgender rights in Uruguay. She is also involved in the intersection of art and activism.

== Biography ==
Martínez knew at a young age that she was transgender. She decided to transition at age 21, and subsequently lost her job which led to her moving to Buenos Aires. In Buenos Aires, she was hired as a sex worker, and later became an activist for transgender rights. Martínez moved back to Uruguay and joined the Union Trans del Uruguay (UTRU) in 2015.

In 2018, she was part of the fight against the repeal of Ley Integral para Personas Trans, which protects transgender people in the country. She had previously campaigned to help establish the law.

Martínez curated and coordinated the third Semana de Arte Trans (SAT) in Montevideo in 2019. The work showed art from artists in Uruguay and outside of the country.
