= Marina Galanou =

Greek LGBT activist (died 2021)

Marina Galanou (died 8 October 2021) was a Greek trans activist, publisher, writer, and columnist.

== Early life ==
Galanou was born in Piraeus, in the city quarter of Piraiki, Greece. She was an active participant in LGBTI activism from 1997 until her death.

== Activism ==
Prompted by the daily persecution of trans people by the police in 2002, Galanou together with other trans persons took the initiative of establishing the first recognized trans collective in Greece, the Association for Solidarity for Transvestites and Transsexual People (SATTE). Galanou was a founding member of SATTE and a Secretary General until July 2004 when she left. As a Secretary General, her action focused on the protection of trans persons from discrimination and racist violence, the protection of trans women from police arbitrariness and the legal recognition of gender identity in line of the then recent jurisprudence of the European Court of Human Rights (ECtHR) (Goodwin v. U.K.)

In June 2004, she resigned from her post as a Secretary General of SATTE and on 17 July of the same year she established the first publishing house – named Colourful Planet – and bookshop specialising in LGBTI literature. The purpose of Colourful Planet is the publication of books focused on LGBTI issues and the collection of bibliography, as well as the promotion of LGBTI culture and diversity. Colourful Planet has also run two poetry and prose competitions as well as many book presentations.

Galanou was also a member of the Greek Homosexual Community, an organization for the defence of fundamental rights of LGBTI persons. She was Secretary General of the organization between May 2006 and April 2008. Her activities focused on the protection of LGBTI persons from discrimination, with particular emphasis on the rights of LGBTI refugees, exclusion from Blood donations and Human Rights Violations in general.

In 2009 and following the dissolution of SATTE, Galanou took the initiative for the creation of a recognized trans collective in Greece. This was achieved in May 2010, with the establishment of the Greek Transgender Support Association (GTSA). Galanou was the GTSA president until now. Her actions focused on claiming fundamental human rights on grounds of expression, identity and gender characteristics – and primarily on racist violence, abolition of hate speech, combatting police arbitrariness, abolishing discrimination, legal recognition of gender identity, supporting sex workers’ rights, prisoners’ rights and refugee rights. Her actions also focused more broadly in the limitation of Prejudices and Stereotypes on grounds of gender, expression, gender identity and characteristics.

Galanou was a Council of Europe expert, and she participated in this capacity in the first special seminar for the Greek Police on issues regarding combating hate crime on grounds of sexual orientation and gender identity, in an international seminar on issues of LGBTI asylum that took place in Athens Bar Association, in two special seminars for asylum case workers. In this capacity, she was also advisory member of the Special Legislative Preparatory Committee for the drafting of a bill on legal recognition of gender identity between March and June 2017.

Galanou wrote articles for newspapers and websites such as Amagi, Epohi, Avgi, and Editors’ Newspaper (efsyn), and has given interviews to many media. She participated in many conferences on human rights issues and Greek, European and international scientific seminars and conferences.

She participated in videos directed by Christos Dimas for the play Partali by Theodoros Gregoriades.

She was also a writer of books on issues of fundamental rights and owner of t-zine, a web magazine for trans rights.

Galanou believed in interdisciplinary feminism that cannot but include the rights of LGBTI persons, non-binary and in general all gender fluid persons, sex workers, refugees, prisoners and in general of all repressed minorities and people living in poverty.

== Books ==
- 2014, «Gender identity and expression. Definitions, stereotypes, discrimination and myths», Transgender Support Association.
- «I am trans – I know my rights», Transgender Support Association.
- 2018, «Gender identity and expression. Definitions, stereotypes, discrimination and myths», Revised and extended re-edition, efsyn newspaper.

== Participation in collective publications ==
2017, Recognizing gender identity: In view of Bill (prepared) by the Ministry of Justice Legislative Preparatory Committee, Sakkoulas Publishing House, Writers: Efi Kounougeri-Manoledaki, Lina Papadopoulou, Katerina Foudedaki, Marina Galanou, Stavros P. Boufidis, Georgios Sarlis [Series: Publications of Medical Law and Bioethics – Issue. 27, Directors of Series: M. Kaiafa-Gbandi, Ε. Kounougeri-Manoledaki, Ε. Symeonidou-Kastanidou].

== TV interviews ==
Interview by Marina Galanou and Anna Apergi in George Kouvaras show, Evening Report of Action24 channel.
