= Romas Zabarauskas =

Lithuanian film director, screenwriter and producer

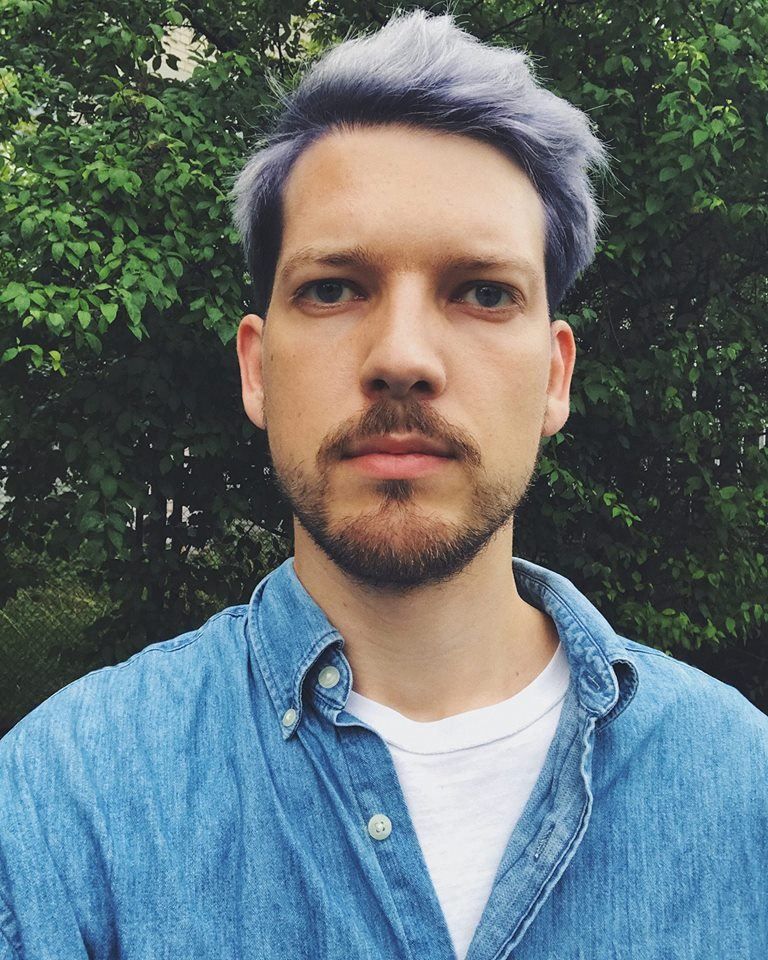
Zabarauskas in 2018

Romas Zabarauskas (born 31 May 1990) is a Lithuanian film director, screenwriter, author, and producer. He established the film company Naratyvas in 2012. Zabarauskas, a member of the European Film Academy, completed film studies at the Paris 8 Vincennes Saint-Denis University with an exchange year at CUNY/Hunter. He had previously attended the Jonas Basanavičius school in Vilnius.

Zabarauskas made his debut with a short film Porno melodrama in 2011, which was shown at the international film festival Berlinale.

Openly gay, Romas takes part in social actions against homophobia. He developed the LGBT Friendly Vilnius initiative, a map of LGBTQ friendly cafes in Vilnius, which aims to promote openness to all sexualities, races, disabilities, and nationalities within the city.

== Filmography ==
- Porno melodrama (short) (2011)
- We Will Riot (2013)
- You Can't Escape Lithuania (2016)
- Advokatas (The Lawyer) (2020)

== Other works ==
- Zabarauskas authored Lithuania Comes Out: 99 LGBT+ Stories, a collection of ninety-nine stories from LGBTQ Lithuanians

== Awards ==
- Best Film runner-up at The Bushwick Film Festival for You Can't Escape Lithuania
- LGBTQ Champion Award, Harvey Milk Foundation, 2021

== Activism ==
Zabarauskas openly campaigns for LGBTQ+ rights. He published an open letter to the Lithuanian president regarding the country's partnership law. He, among other Lithuanians, gathered at the Seimas to campaign for the Partnership Law to be passed, at which he was a speaker. He also champions other causes, such as supporting refugees within Lithuania, namely in partnership with donation platform Aukok.It, in collaboration with the Lithuanian Red Cross, and as a member of the Become an Ambassador project.

Romas Zabarauskas has been vegan since 2014.
