= Lương Thế Huy =

Vietnamese jurist and activist (born 1988)

- Born: 31 October 1988
- Alma mater: Ho Chi Minh City University of Law; University of California, Los Angeles
- Occupation: LGBT rights activist, jurist, politician
- Employer: Institute for Studies of Society, Economy and Environment (2019–)

Lương Thế Huy (born 31 October 1988) is a Vietnamese jurist and LGBT rights activist.

== Biography ==
He studied law at Ho Chi Minh City University of Law and University of California, Los Angeles.

He has been doing LGBT-related social work since 2008. He was listed as one of Forbes 30 Under 30 in Vietnam in 2016 and "Asia 21 Young Leaders" of Asia Society in 2018. In 2019, he became director of the Institute for Studies of Society, Economy and Environment (iSEE). In May 2021, he contested the Vietnam's National Assembly elections, becoming the first openly LGBT candidate. He was not elected despite being one of the most prominent independent candidates for Hanoi city.
