= Yuma Yuma =

Psychotherapist and LGBT rights activist

- Born: 1972 (age 52–53); Turkmenistan
- Occupations: Psychotherapist; activist

Yuma Yuma (Russian: Юма Юма; born 1972), known simply as Yuma, is a Turkmen-born Russian psychotherapist and LGBT rights activist. She became known in Russia after appearing on an advertisement by the supermarket chain VkusVill along with her lesbian family.

== Biography ==
Yuma became an activist for LGBT rights after the Federal Assembly passed its gay propaganda law in June 2013. She provides psychological assistance to LGBT community from Chechnya who said Russian police tortured them in 2017 and 2018. She has also supported LGBT festivals and events in her country.

On 30 June 2021, the advertisement “Recipes for a Happy Family” was published on the VkusVill website, which described families buying products in the supermarket chain. It depicts the story of an LGBT family, which caused polarizing reactions in Runet. Some media reported the first case of support for the LGBT movement in the history of the company. However, after the material was distributed among ultra-conservative Telegram channels, VkusVill, as well as the families of the women from the ad, began to receive threats, including physical violence. As a result of public outcry, the company's management removed the ad from their website and social networks and apologized for their mistake. Due to the threats, Yuma and her partner and daughters fled Russia for Spain.

In August 2021, Yuma moved to Barcelona together with her partner Zhenya, their daughters Alina and Mila and Alina's partner Ksyusha.

== Awards and recognition ==
In 2021, Yuma was listed as one of the BBC 100 Women of the year.
