= Matcha Phorn-in =

Thai activist

- มัจฉา พรอินทร์
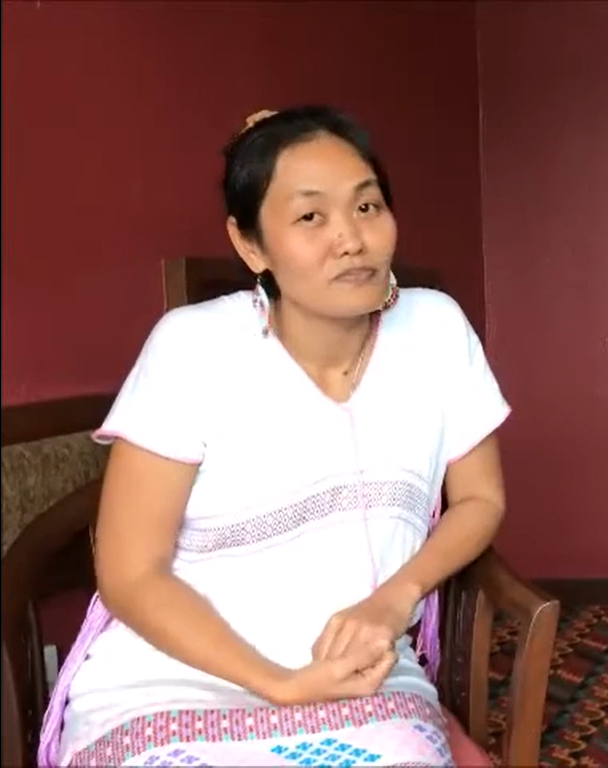
- Matcha in 2017 interview
- Born: 1979 or 1980 (age 46–47); Isan, Thailand

Matcha Phorn-in (Thai: มัจฉา พรอินทร์, RTGS: Matcha Phon-in; born 1979/1980) is a Thai feminist and activist for indigenous and LGBT rights.

== Early life ==
Matcha grew up in Isan, and was raised by a poor single mother. These factors led her to be bullied in school. Starting at age 9, she began to work on the weekends to support herself and her mother.

Matcha was able to attend university after receiving a scholarship. After graduating, she participated in a one-year graduate program at Thammasat University.

== Activism ==
Matcha is the executive director of Sangsan Anakot Yaowachon, an organization which supports youth from marginalized communities, primarily in the villages on Thailand's border with Myanmar. She founded the organization in 2007. In the organization's first decade, it was able to provide scholarship to 1,000 children, but the program was discontinued in the late 2010s due to lack of financial support.

Matcha is a board member of International Family Equality Day (IFED), and a former board member of ILGA Asia. She is a regional council member of the Asia-Pacific Forum on Women, Law and Development (APWLD).

Matcha has also spoken in favor of legal abortion up to 20 weeks, compared to Thailand's stricter legal standard of 12 weeks.

In 2020 and 2021, Matcha criticized the Thai government for not providing financial aid to ethnic minorities, who consequently were more harshly impacted by the COVID-19 pandemic.

== Recognition ==
In 2023, Matcha was named to the BBC's 100 Women list as one of the world's inspiring and influential women of the year.

== Personal life ==
Matcha is a lesbian. Her partner also works at Sangsan Anakot Yaowachon. Matcha also has an adopted daughter, her biological niece, who was born in the early 2000s to Matcha's younger brother. After he and his wife separated, their daughter was raised by her grandmother, until Phorn-in took her in at age 9. However, Phorn-in was not able to legally adopt her daughter until she became a legal adult, as her extended family objected to Matcha having a woman as a partner.

Matcha and her family live in San Kamphaeng, Chiang Mai. In 2016, a neighbor set fires near their home several times, which Matcha believed were driven by homophobia; despite reports made to the police, no action was taken.
