= Eugenio Talbot Wright =

Argentine human rights and LGBTQ activist

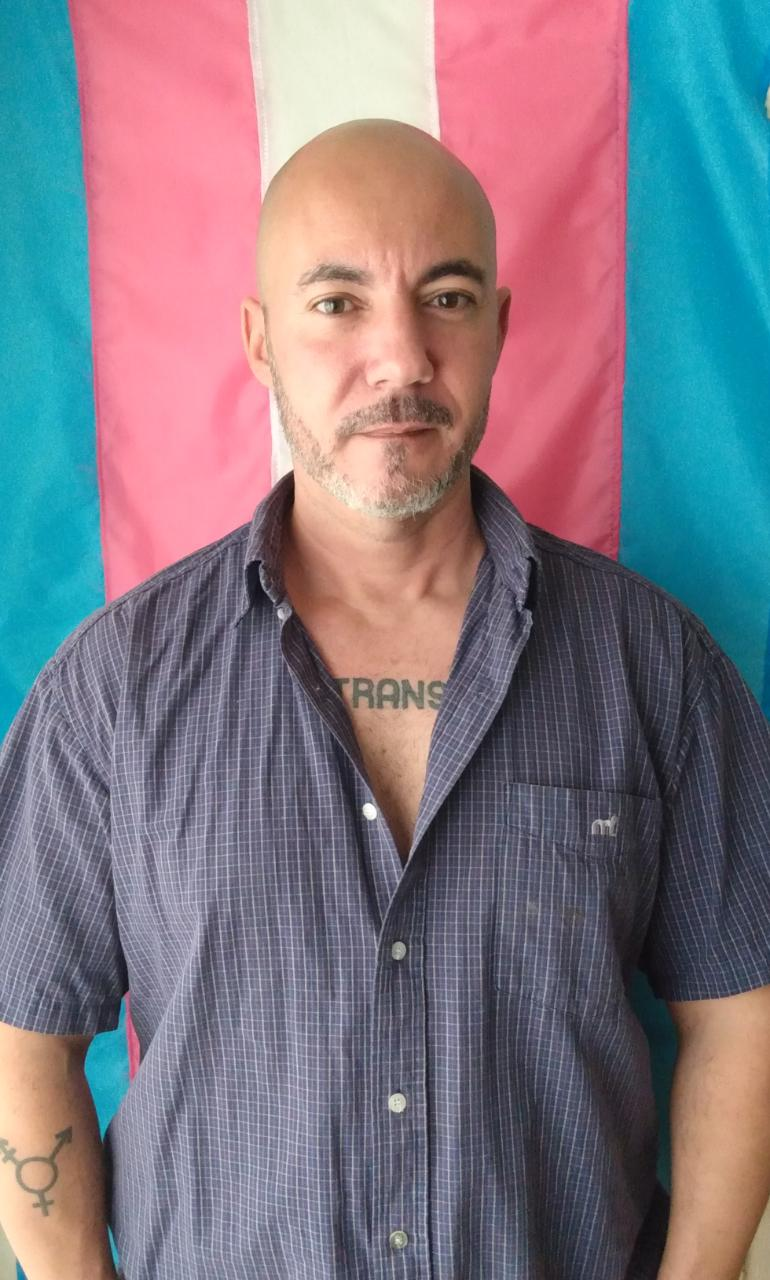
- Talbot Wright in 2022
- Born: Eugenio Ernesto Talbot Wright; 1973
- Died: April 7, 2022 (aged 48–49)
- Education: National University of Cordoba
- Occupations: Human rights activist LGBTQ rights activist

Eugenio Ernesto Talbot Wright (1973 – 7 April 2022) was a social communicator and human rights activist from Argentina. He was one of the first trans rights activists and one of the first openly trans men in Córdoba.

== Early life ==
Eugenio Ernesto Talbot Wright was born in 1973. He manifested a gender identity different from the one assigned to him at birth when he was very young. His father was Héctor Talbot Wright, a member of the militant organization Montoneros, who was kidnapped and killed at the Navy School of Mechanics on 16 October 1976.

Talbot Wright enroled at the National University of Córdoba in the late 1980s, from where he was expelled in the 1990s due to his gender identity. He returned to the Faculty of Communication Sciences at the university in 2019 to pursue a bachelor's degree in social communication.

== LGBT activism ==
Talbot Wright was part of the first LGBT rights organizations formed in Córdoba, which succeeded in 1995 in repealing Article 19 of the Code of Misdemeanours, which allowed the police to perpetuate criminalization and repressive violence against trans people and transvestites. In 2021, he collaborated with Archivo de la Memoria Trans, working to recover the photographic memory of trans people from Córdoba. In the same year, he assumed the leadership of human rights at the Córdoba branch of the State Workers Association (Asociación Trabajadores del Estado or ATE), and served as a sectoral delegate of the ATE in the Under-secretariat of Diversity of the Ministry of Women, Gender and Diversity.

Talbot Wright was part of various human rights groups and organizations such as Familiares de Desaparecidos y Detenidos por Razones Políticas (Relatives of the Disappeared and Detained for Political Reasons) and Hijas e Hijos por la Identidad y la Justicia contra el Olvido y el Silencio (Daughters and Sons for Identity and Justice Against Forgetfulness and Silence).

== Death and legacy ==
Talbot Wright died on 7 April 2022, at the age of 49.

In December 2022, during the Militancy Day and Human Rights Day, the ATE unveiled a plaque commemorating Talbot Wright at its headquarters located at Entre Ríos 450 in Córdoba.

In November 2024, during the fifth edition of the Travapalooza, cartoonist Gonzalo Amieva created a mural in honour of Talbot Wright, located in the Casa Verde Pavilion of the University City of Córdoba. In February 2025, the mural was vandalised along with other murals dedicated to the Mothers of Plaza de Mayo and Mariano Ferreyra. The mural was later repainted.

In May 2026, the Eugenio Talbot Wright Genre and Diversity Library at the Faculty of Communication Sciences of the National University of Córdoba was inaugurated.
