= Ryan Sallans =

Transgender speaker

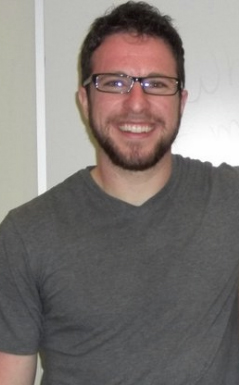
- Sallans in 2011
- Born: 1979 (age 46–47); Aurora, Nebraska, U.S.
- Education: University of Nebraska–Lincoln
- Occupations: Public speaker, activist, author
- Years active: 2005–present
- Known for: LGBT activism
- Website: ryansallans.com

Ryan Sallans (born 1979) is an American LGBT author, speaker, advocate and out trans man. Sallans began his transition in 2005. He travels the United States speaking to professionals, college audiences, and youth about gender identity, gender expression, and sexual orientation along with his story of being transgender and the changing nature of health care.

Sallans has been featured in Closer Magazine, the Salina Journal, The Reader, NewsNetNebraska, Oddee.com, The Advocate, and many more including The Chicago Bureau, BuzzFeed, and US News. He shares his story about his struggle with an eating disorder and how he came to terms with his gender identity.

Sallans was a guest on Larry King Live in 2007 and 2009. He has also appeared on The Ricki Lake Show in 2012 and Trisha in 2012. In 2013 he was interviewed on the NPR radio show, On Point with Tom Ashbrook and also on HuffPost Live with Josh Zepps.

== Gender transition ==
In 2005, Sallans began undergoing a physical and social gender transition. He had a bilateral mastectomy with nipple grafts performed the beginning of May 2005 before beginning hormone therapy in June. During this time he was featured in the LOGO documentary, Gender Rebel, which captured him at the beginning of his transition. In July 2005, a Nebraska Court granted his request for a name change and he legally completed his transition in October 2005, when he had his gender officially changed on all of his legal documents including his birth certificate. Ryan also underwent lower surgery in the form of a hysterectomy in 2006 and a metoidioplasty in 2008.

== Public speaking ==
Since 1999, Sallans has worked as a trainer and speaker and now focuses his work on issues surrounding eating disorders, body image, gender identity, sexual orientation, and health care. Ryan is hired by corporations, health care institutions, universities, non-profit organizations and federal agencies to provide keynotes, campus programming, and professional staff development trainings. His work as a speaker is rooted in storytelling and branches out to interlace personal stories with research and data focused on creating inclusive environments for LGBTQ individuals, employees and patients. He is hosted as a keynote speaker across the country for conferences and diversity and inclusion events highlighting finding similarities through our differences.

== Author ==
Sallans has authored two books, the first is Second Son: Transitioning Toward My Destiny, Love and Life in 2013. His second book, released September 24, 2019 is titled Transforming Manhood: A trans man's quest to build bridges and knock down walls. He's also written or co-authored articles for journal publications including Journal of Ethics in Mental Health and Journal of Ethics.
