= Anna Rosenwasser =

Swiss journalist, activist and politician (born 1990)

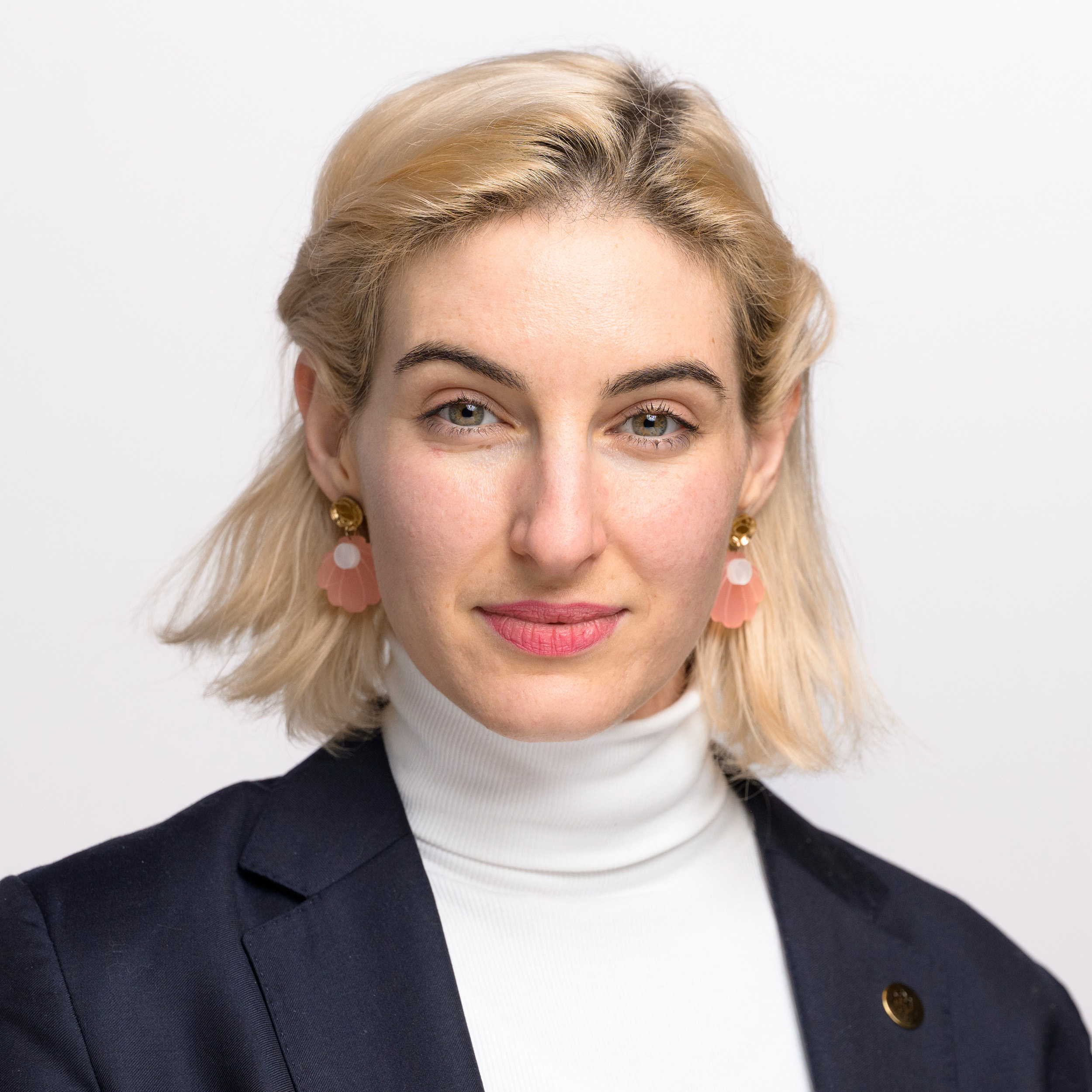
- Official portrait, 2023

Member of the National Council (Switzerland)
- Incumbent
- Assumed office 4 December 2023
- Constituency: Canton of Zurich

Personal details
- Born: Anna Rosenwasser; 1 May 1990 (age 36) Schaffhausen, Switzerland
- Citizenship: Switzerland; Israel (de facto)
- Party: Social Democratic Party
- Education: ZHAW; University of Zurich
- Occupation: Journalist, editorialist, politician
- Website: Official website Parliament website

Anna Rosenwasser (German pronunciation: [ˈana ˈroːzn̩ˌvasɐ]; born 1 May 1990) is a Swiss journalist, editorialist, political, pro-LGBTQ-activist and politician who currently serves on the National Council (Switzerland)for the Social Democratic Party since 2023.

She came to public fame in Switzerland through her commitment to LGBT rights, especially same-sex marriage. She is a public critic of homophobia and discrimination or sexual minorities.

== Early life and education ==
Rosenwasser was born 1 May 1990 in Schaffhausen, Switzerland, into a left-leaning Secular Jewish family. Her father is originally Israeli, while her mother is Swiss, and she has three brothers. R. studied journalism at ZHAW Winterthur, as well as political science and modern history at the University of Zurich.

== Career ==
She has been working as a freelance journalist since 2008, writing columns for publications such as hellozurich, SAITEN, and Mannschaft Magazin. She served for several years on the board of Milchjugend, the largest Swiss LGBTQ youth group. In 2017, she co-founded the Schaffhausen LGBTQ youth group andersh, which she went on to lead. Anna Rosenwasser was also co-managing director of the lesbian organisation Schweiz LOS from 2017 to 2021.

In 2018, Rosenwasser was nominated for the LGBT+ Award of the Swiss Diversity Awards. In 2019, she ran for the National Council as second place on the Socialist Youth (JUSO) list.

In 2021, she co-authored the book Queer Sex – Whatever the fuck you want with politician Florian Vock and illustrator Claudio Näf.

Rosenwasser was involved in the debates of the 2018 Referendum on widening antiracist penal norms, as well as in the 2021 introduction of same-sex marriage in Switzerland. She thus came to international prominence, with her activity coming to the notice of the Spiegel and the BBC.

== Personal life ==
Rosenwasser is openly bisexual. She lives in a domestic partnership in Zurich.

== Bibliography ==
- Anna Rosenwasser, Florian Vock and Claudio Näf: Queer Sex – Whatever the fuck you want. Print Matters, Zürich 2021, ISBN 978-3-033-08178-9
- Anna Rosenwasser: Rosa Buch. Rotpunktverlag, Zürich 2023, ISBN 978-3-85869-981-7
- Anna Rosenwasser: Herz. Rotpunktverlag, Zürich 2025, ISBN 978-3-03973-055-1
