= Marcela Pini =

Uruguayan activist, psychologist

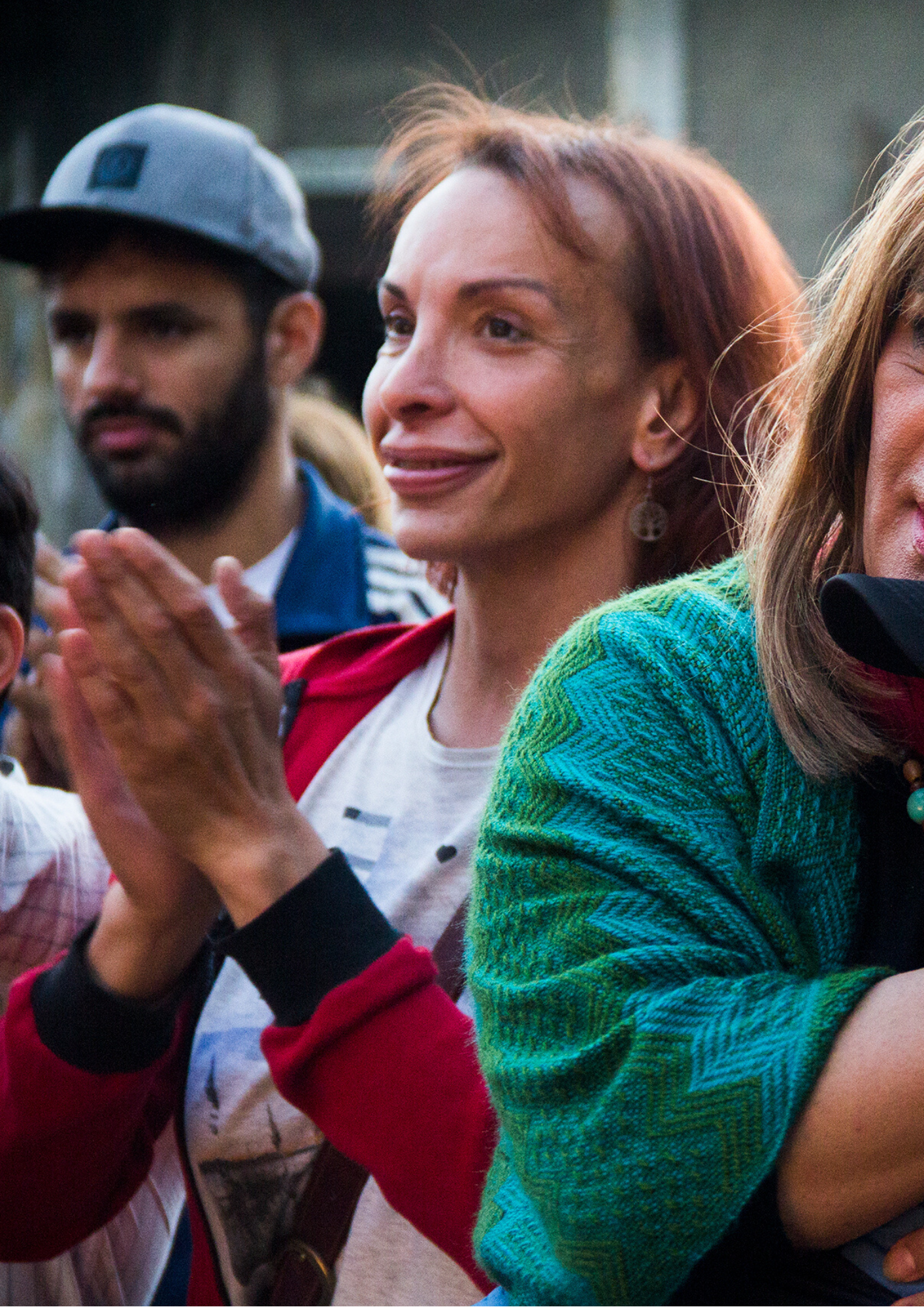
Marcela Pini at the Semana de Arte Trans in Montevideo in 2018.

Marcela Pini (born 1972) is a Uruguayan activist, psychologist and teacher. Pini is one of the first three transgender people to have earned a college degree in Uruguay.

== Biography ==
Pini was born in 1972. In the 1990s, she attended school to study psychology, but dropped out when she began to transition. After dropping out, Pini earned money as a sex worker. Pini went back to school at the Universidad de la Republica in 2013 and earned her degree in psychology three years later. She is one of the first three transgender women to have earned a college degree in Uruguay. Pini is now a faculty member at the Universidad de la Republica.

Pini works to support and expand rights for transgender people in Uruguay and is a member of Unión Trans in Montevideo. She has worked to support the law protecting transgender people, the Ley integral para Personas Trans.
