= Sarah Gill (physician) =

Pakistani transgender doctor

- Education: Pakistan Air Force School Jinnah Medical and Dental College
- Occupations: Physician; activist
- Known for: First transgender doctor in Pakistan.

Sarah Gill (Urdu: سارہ گِل) is a Pakistani physician and transgender activist. After her graduation from medical school she was widely described as "Pakistan's first transgender doctor".

== Education ==
Gill was educated at the Pakistan Air Force School. She then was enrolled at Jinnah Medical and Dental College, Karachi and graduated in January 2021, becoming the first transgender female doctor in Pakistan. She was selected by the US State Department for the IVLP Fellowship Program. During her medical degree she decided to declare her gender identity; her family which had been forcing her to keep it secret abandoned her after she publicly came out. She has stated "Our community enjoyed tremendous respect in Islam as well as in the history of Muslim rulers" and "It was only after the British came to this continent that we were declared criminals by law and since then, our community is constantly facing inhuman discrimination and have become a symbol of shame."

== Activism ==
Gill is president of an NGO called the Moorat Interactive Society, as well as a member of Gender Interactive Alliance (GIA), which work to end violence and discrimination against the transgender community. She is a prominent activist and has represented Pakistan's transgender community at various national and international forums, and has conducted HIV/AIDS awareness campaigns. She has critiqued the Transgender Persons (Protection of Rights) Act of 2018 for inadequacies regarding their transgender and intersex definitions. Her organizations advocates for equality and civil rights for transgender people, "including, but not limited to, intersexual, transsexual, hijra, khwaja sira, butch, cross-dressers, and transvestites" in Pakistan. After her graduation from medical school she was widely described as "Pakistan's first transgender doctor". In 2024 she was a leading voice at Karachi's Hijra Festival.
