= Vic Basile =

LGBTQ rights activist

Victor Basile
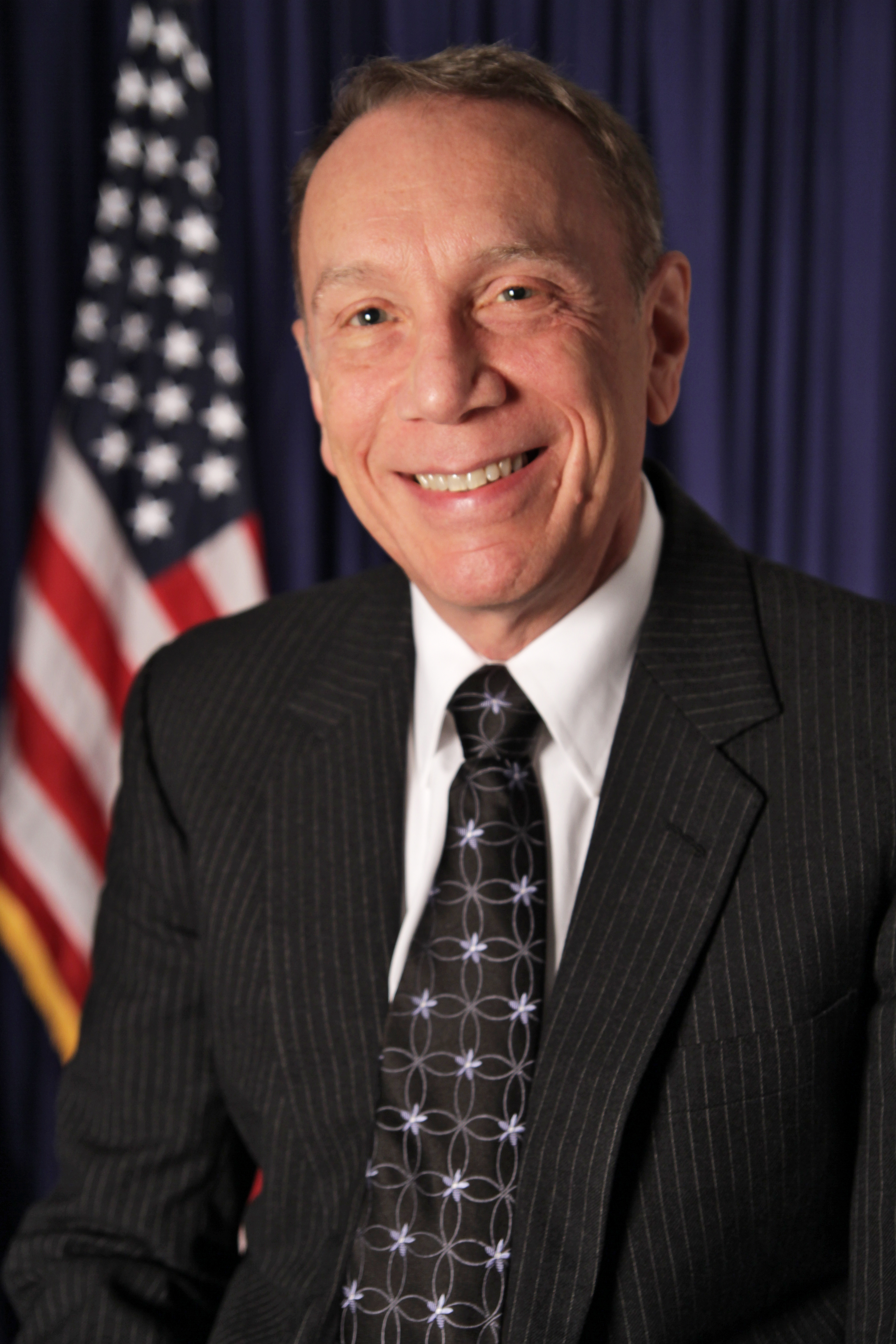
- Victor Basile, official OPM portrait
- Occupation: Political strategist
- Title: First executive director, Human Rights Campaign
- Term: June 1983-June 1989

Victor Basile is an author and American LGBTQ rights activist who was the first executive director of the Human Rights Campaign (then the Human Rights Campaign Fund), serving in that position from June 1983 to June 1989.

Basile served in the Clinton Administration at the Peace Corps, raising money for volunteer projects for which there were no appropriated dollars. He also served in the Obama Administration as a Counselor to the Director of the United States Office of Personnel Management from April 2009 to April 2014 where he advised on LGBTQ issues. He also advocated for reforms to the federal employee retirement system and supported the overhaul of the agency's website.

In 2023, he published Bending Toward Justice, a memoir and early history of the Human Rights Campaign.

== Early life ==
Vic was born in Northampton, Massachusetts, as one of four children in a Catholic family. His father was an insurance salesman and his mother was a homemaker. He was Vice President of his senior class and active in the school's audio-visual club. He went to the University of Massachusetts at Amherst and studied public health education. After college, he joined the American Lung Association in Hartford, CT, where he advocated for the health needs of low-income urban residents.

In spring 1971, Basile married Mary Ann Pryor and moved to Washington, DC, where he worked at ACTION, then the umbrella agency for the Peace Corps and VISTA. While there, he successfully organized the local of American Federation of State, County and Municipal Employees, an international union based in Washington, D.C. He served as president of the local from 1978 to 1981.

In 1979, during the first march for lesbian and gay rights, he started to awaken to the fact that he was gay while watching from across the National Mall. Shortly thereafter, he came out to Mary Ann. They got divorced in 1984 and remain close friends to this day.

== HRC Tenure and AIDS Crisis ==
In the early days of HRC, in addition to building the organization, Basile's tenure became focused on raising money for AIDS research, treatment, and education. This was happening against the backdrop of the Reagan Administration's persistent efforts to defund said efforts. Reagan had a powerful ally in Sen. Jesse Helms (R-NC), who would offer amendments that made it impossible to use federal dollars for safe-sex education.

In a Washington Post expose from June 2022, Basile was sharing about one of his biggest professional victories from the time:

Soon there was a more pressing priority: AIDS. One of Basile’s biggest professional victories came in 1986, after evidence emerged that the drug AZT was showing promise as an AIDS treatment. Despite that good news, there was no money to distribute the drug. So Basile, Rosen and one other associate secured an 11th-hour meeting with Lowell Weicker, a senator from Connecticut who was chair of the subcommittee responsible for funding. “I don’t know what I can do,” Basile remembers Weicker saying, but the next day the senator spoke of their meeting on the Senate floor and requested $47 million be included in the budget to distribute AZT. The money was approved.

In the late 1980s, Basile led an expansion of HRC's mission to include lobbying and field organizing and added a foundation with an initial $50,000 gift from Terry Watanabe. The foundation's early work was to study how gay and lesbian issues actually played in campaigns to find out whether it was detrimental or not; the research showed that it was an insignificant issue. This allowed Basile and the HRC to approach members of congress who had previously had concerns about taking money from a gay organization.

== Victory Fund ==
Basile was, along with William Waybourn, a co-founder of the Gay & Lesbian Victory Fund, which works toward the election of gay and lesbian political candidates.

The idea came after years of state and local candidates coming to the HRC seeking support for their campaigns. At the time, the HRC was not able to provide that kind of political support because its mission was squarely aimed at electing congressional candidates supportive of LGBTQ issues.

After leaving HRC, Basile consulted for EMILY's List, a political action committee supporting pro-choice Democratic women candidates. EMILY is an acronym for Early Money Is Like Yeast, and the philosophy was that it makes the dough rise. In recounting the story in 2023, Basile said, "I thought to myself, that's a perfectly transferrable model, let's do it for the gays."

In a phone conversation with Waybourn, the two decided to form a group to support openly gay and lesbian candidates, and began tapping their networks to explore feasibility. Heartened by the support, they convened an inaugural board of directors and held the first meeting in May 1991.

== Bending Toward Justice ==
Basile has mused about writing a book for years. He started writing Bending Toward Justice during the COVID-19 pandemic, motivated by the desire to tell the story of Steve Endean's founding of the HRC. Also, given the recent resurgence of bigotry and discrimination, Basile wanted get the message out there, particularly to young people and the rising generation, that the LGBTQ+ movement has overcome difficult times before and is resilient.

The following excerpt from the book sets the scene: "While the band was playing on and protestors were mounting revolutions in churches and at government headquarters, one small group of political activists was quietly playing an inside game - walking the marble halls of Congress, crafting compromises with legislators who openly loathed them, and harnessing an improbable silver lining in the horror of AIDS as they slowly, surely, and strategically guided an evolutionary transformation from abhorrence to acknowledgement, acceptance, and respect."

About the book, former congressman Barney Frank said, "Drawing on his experience as the first executive director of the Human Rights Campaign Fund, Vic Basile has written a valuable addition to the story of one of the most consequential movements in post-World War II America...".

== Past ==
Basile has been, at least in the past, a supporter of outing gay politicians who work against LGBTQ rights. In 1989, the Washington Post quoted him as saying "Those who participate in the (gay) community and then vote against it are guilty of hypocrisy-hypocrisy that causes harm to a whole class of people. Their duplicitous, devious, harmful behavior ought to be exposed."

Basile remained on the board of HRC and has been involved in recruiting efforts for later heads of the HRC, such as the efforts which selected Joe Solmonese and Cheryl Jacques.

Basile was an executive producer of the 1989 documentary After Stonewall.

Basile was later executive director of the Baltimore-area charity, Movable Feast, which delivers meals to HIV and AIDS patients who can't leave their homes.

Human Rights Campaign
New title	Executive Director; June 1983 – June 1989	Succeeded by Tim McFeeley
