= Endean =

Endean is a surname. It comes as nickname from Cornish an den, meaning "the man", likely signifying a leader. In Cornwall, the surname is most found in St. Agnes, Penryn, and Saltash. Notable people with the surname include:

- Barry Endean (born 1946), English footballer
- Bill Endean (1884–1957), New Zealand politician
- Craig Endean (born 1968), Canadian hockey player
- John Endean (1844–1925), British miner and businessman
- Robert Endean (1925–1997), Australian marine scientist and academic
- Russell Endean (1924–2003), South African cricketer
- Steve Endean (1948–1993), American gay rights activist
