= Black Tie Dinner =

LGBTQ charity event in Dallas, Texas

Black Tie Dinner, Inc.
- Founded: 1982
- Type: 501(c)(3) Non-profit (Charity)
- Purpose: LGBTQ Organizations
- Location: Dallas, Texas
- Region served: North Texas
- Method: Gala Dinner
- Co-Chair: Dustin Vyers
- Co-Chair: Liliana Villarreal
- Website: blacktie.org

Black Tie Dinner is a formal charity dinner held each year in Dallas, Texas to raise money for the North Texas lesbian, gay, bisexual, transgender, and queer (LGBTQ) community. The first dinner was held in 1982. Since its inception, Black Tie Dinner has remained one of the largest LGBTQ fund-raising dinners in the nation, both in attendance and distribution. Today, the dinner is attended by over 2,500 guests per year, and has an annual distribution of over $1 million. Each year, Black Tie Dinner selects up to 20 LGBT focused organizations in the North Texas area to receive proceeds from the dinner, in addition to one standing National beneficiary, the Human Rights Campaign Foundation. To date, Black Tie Dinner has raised over $30 million.

In 2023, the organization hit a record-breaking total distribution of $1.73 million.

Over the years, Black Tie Dinner has attracted an array of high-profile politicians, Hollywood celebrities, and other public figures, both as program entertainment and as attendees of the dinner. Examples include Cynthia Nixon, Dr. Eric Cervini, Niecy Nash, Matt Bomer, Gus Kenworthy, Ryan O'Connell, Billy Porter, Debra Messing, Connie Britton, Goldie Hawn, Megan Mullally, Geena Davis, Sharon Stone, Martin Sheen and Lily Tomlin.

Black Tie Dinner is often mistaken for the Human Rights Campaign (HRC) "gala" dinners which are held in many major cities around the nation. The Black Tie Dinner event was originally organized solely to support the Human Right Campaign Foundation (HRCF) that later became HRC, and was run for that purpose for a number of years. That concept would become the model for the HRC Black Tie Dinners around the country. While the Human Rights Campaign Foundation receives approximately one half of the proceeds from the dinner, Black Tie Dinner, Inc. is an independent 501(c)(3) organization with its own Board of Directors. Black Tie Dinner also has the distinction of benefiting local beneficiaries.

== Mission Statement ==
"Black Tie Dinner raises funds and provides resources for LGBTQ+ supportive organizations through premier events in partnership with the community."

== Vision Statement ==
"We envision a community where the lives of all LGBTQ+ individuals are improved, accepted, and recognized."

== Purpose Pillars ==
Education: Advance acceptance by offering a platform to learn about the lives of LGBTQ+ individuals

Empowerment: Improve the lives of LGBTQ+ individuals by providing resources for North Texas and national supportive organizations

Entertainment: Recognize and celebrate LGBTQ+ individuals and culture through engaging

== History ==
In early 1982, the newly formed Human Rights Campaign Fund (HRCF), which became the Human Rights Campaign (HRC) under the leadership of Executive Director Elizabeth Birch in the late 1990s, designated one of its leaders, Jim Foster, to make contact with the gay communities of several larger cities to test their interest in holding a formal fund-raising dinner to support HRCF. One of the individuals Foster contacted was an old friend who had recently moved to Dallas, Texas, John Thomas. Thomas agreed to meet with Foster if he would come to Dallas, and to pull in a couple of friends who had broader connections with the gay community there, Ray Kuchling and Mike Anglin. That meeting was held, and after a short discussion of the magnitude of such a project, Anglin said: "I think we're going to need a bigger boat." He called his friend Dick Weaver, who immediately agreed to host a larger gathering of potential volunteers for the effort at his apartment the following evening (March 19, 1982). At the second meeting, the first "Dallas Dinner Committee" was formed, and it was agreed that John Thomas would serve as chair and that the group would commit itself to hosting a large (for that era) formal black tie dinner, with the net proceeds to be donated to HRCF. One unique feature of this effort was that it would be entirely controlled through its local committee rather than by the national HRCF organization, and in later years the net proceeds from the event would be split between HRCF and local Dallas charitable organizations serving the gay community. The first Dallas Black Tie Dinner, held in October 1982 at the Fairmont Hotel in downtown Dallas, was attended by 140 people, and produced a $6,000 donation to the Human Rights Campaign Foundation. Each year thereafter, the dinner grew in both attendance and distribution. During its first 25 years, the dinner raised more than $10 million. Since then, the dinner has maintained an annual distribution of over $1 million and an average attendance of 2,500 guests per year.

== Beneficiaries ==
Each year, beneficiaries are selected by Black Tie Dinner's Board of Directors. Beneficiaries are selected based on the quality and impact of service they provide to the North Texas LGBTQ community, as well their financial health and overall stability. Only 501(c)(3) non-profits are considered. In addition to providing a significant service to the North Texas LGBTQ community, applicants must use the majority of their funds for direct programs, services, and/or activities. The beneficiaries selected for 2023 are:

- Human Rights Campaign Foundation (standing National beneficiary)
- AIDS Services Dallas
- Big Brothers Big Sisters Lone Star
- Black Trans Advocacy Coalition
- Cathedral of Hope United Church of Christ
- Coalition for Aging LGBT
- Dallas Hope Charities
- Equality Texas Foundation
- HELP Center for LGBT Health & Wellness
- Legacy Cares
- Northaven United Methodist Church
- Planned Parenthood
- Pride Frisco
- Resource Center
- Synergy Wesley Foundation
- Texas Health Action
- The Women's Chorus of Dallas
- Turtle Creek Chorale
- Uptown Players

== Awards ==
Each year, Black Tie Dinner recognizes several individuals and/or organizations that have made a "significant contribution to the continued fight for LGBTQ equality". The awards are publicly announced in advance of the dinner, and presented to their recipients as part of the dinner program. Of the three awards given, two are generally awarded to public figures, while the third is meant to recognize local community leaders.

=== Media Award ===
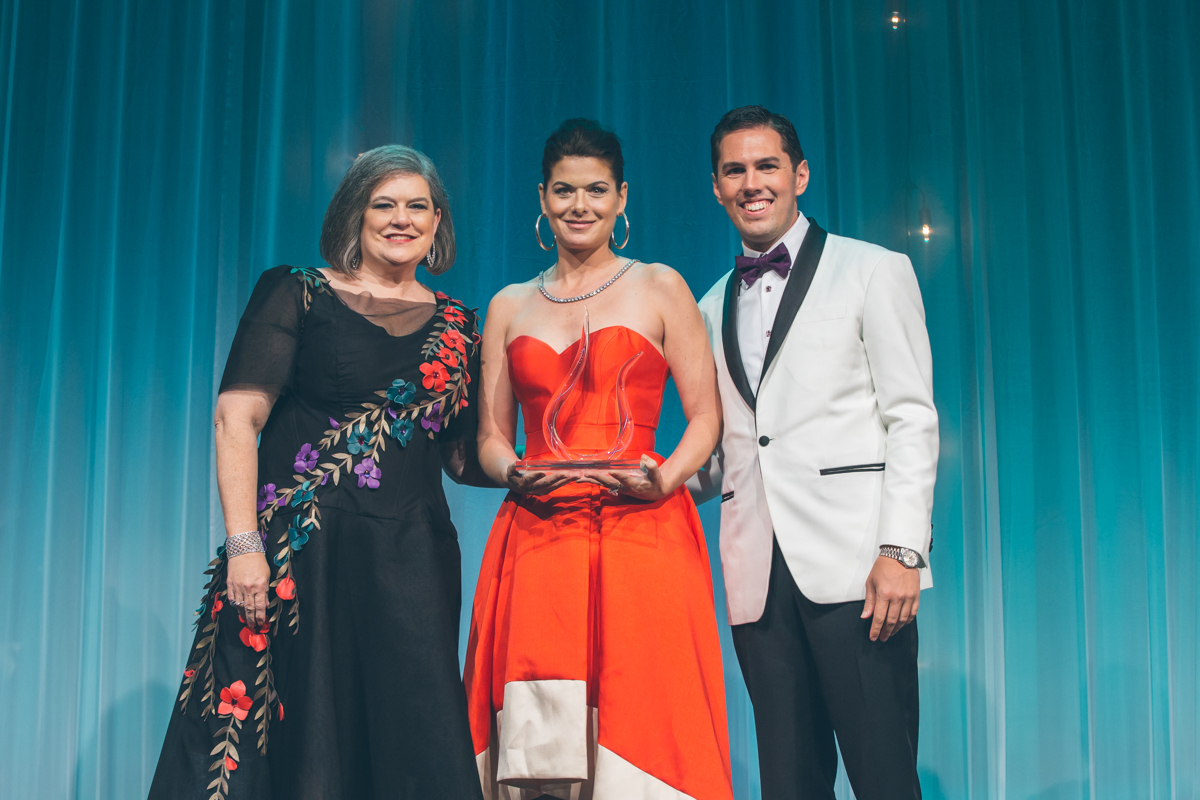
Debra Messing receiving the Media Award at the 2017 Black Tie Dinner

The Black Tie Dinner Media Award was established in 2008, and recognizes the importance of increased positive awareness of LGBTQ issues in the media. Recipients have included:

- Cynthia Nixon (2023)
- Coleman Domingo (2022)
- Bobby Berk (2021)
- Erich Bergen (2018)
- Debra Messing (2016)
- E! Entertainment (2015)
- Dale Hansen (2014)
- Fran Drescher and Peter Marc Jacobson (2013)
- JC Penney (2012)
- Jesse Tyler Ferguson (2011)
- Chely Wright (2010)
- Cyndi Lauper (2009)
- Logo Network (2008)

=== Black Tie Dinner Equality Award ===
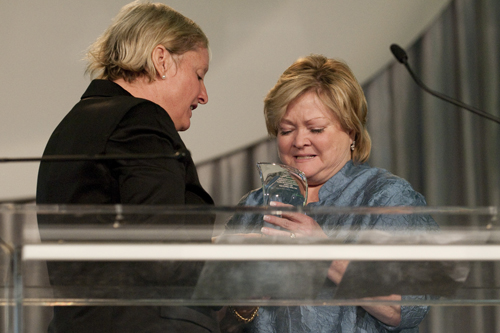
Elizabeth Birch presents her namesake award to Judy Shepard at the 2009 Black Tie Dinner.

The Black Tie Dinner Equality Award (formerly the Elizabeth Birch Equality Award) is given in recognition of demonstrated national impact on LGBTQ rights. Recipients have included:

- Dr. Eric Cervini (2023)
- Gus Kenworthy (2022)
- Niecy Nash (2021)
- Billy Porter (2019)
- Edith Windsor (2017)
- Greg Louganis (2016)
- The Trevor Project (2015)
- David Boies and Ted Olson (2014)
- Zach Wahls (2013)
- Chaz Bono (2012)
- Eric Alva (2011)
- American Airlines (2010)
- Judy Shepard (2009)
- Bishop V. Gene Robinson (2008)
- Alan Cumming (2006)
- Sharon Stone (2005)
- Robert Greenblatt and Showtime Networks (2004)
- Elizabeth Birch (2003)

=== Ally for Equality Award ===
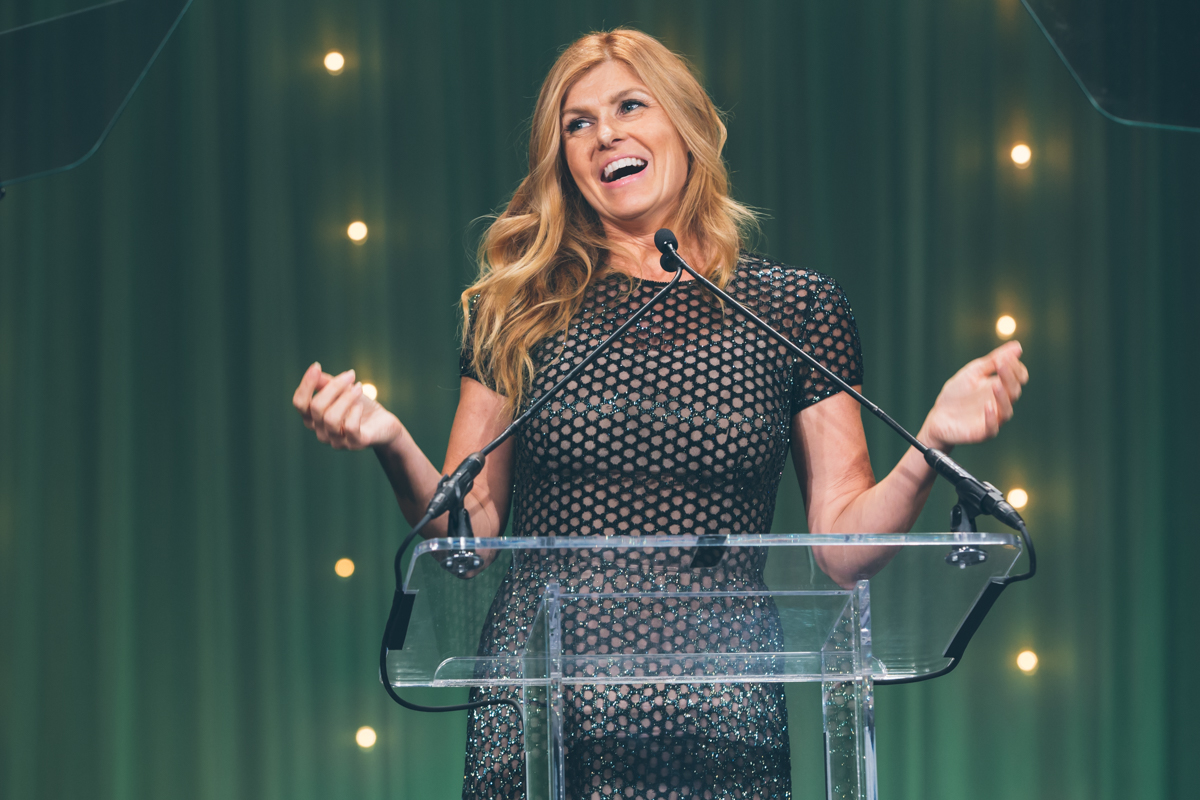
Connie Britton, recipient of the Ally for Equality Award, speaks at the 2016 Black Tie Dinner.

Established in 2016, the Black Tie Dinner Ally for Equality Award recognizes a distinguished ally who has made a significant, positive impact, through personal and professional activities, on the LGBT community.

- Jessi Cruickshank (2018)
- Terrence McNally (2017)
- Connie Britton (2016)

=== Vanguard Award ===
Established in 2021, the Black Tie Dinner Vanguard Award is given to an individual blazing a trail on behalf the LGBTQ+ community.

- Rafael L. Silva (2022)
- Shangela (2021)

=== Kuchling Humanitarian Award ===
The Kuchling Humanitarian Award has been presented at every Black Tie Dinner since 1983. The award is given to individuals who have made extraordinary gifts of their time and talents on behalf of the gay, lesbian bisexual and transgender community. The award is named in honor of the late Raymond Kuchling, a leading activist in Dallas’ LGBTQ community in the 1980s.

== Speakers ==
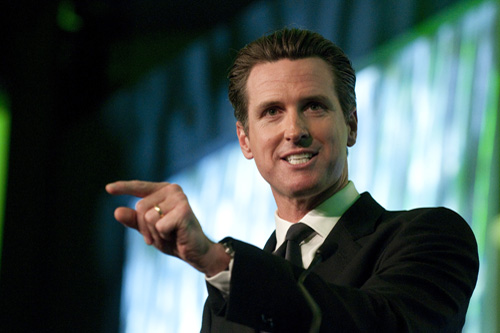
San Francisco Mayor Gavin Newsom delivers the keynote at the 2009 Black Tie Dinner.

For many years, Black Tie Dinner featured a high-profile keynote speaker. Speakers were typically politicians, Hollywood celebrities or other prominent figures who have demonstrated a notable advocacy to the LGBTQ community. Recent keynote speakers have included:

- Lance Bass (2019)
- Matt Bomer (2018)
- Beto O'Rourke (2018)
- Dustin Lance Black (2013)
- Meredith Baxter (2012)
- Marlee Matlin (2011)
- Congresswoman Tammy Baldwin (2010)
- Gavin Newsom (2009)
- Kenneth Cole (2008)
- Martin Sheen (2007)
- Geena Davis (2006)
- Lily Tomlin (2005)
- Ambassador Carol Moseley Braun (2004)
- Governor Ann Richards (2003)
- Goldie Hawn (2003)
- Stockard Channing (2002)
- Megan Mullally (2001)
- Kathy Najimy (2000)
- Armistead Maupin (1999)
- Linda Ellerbee (1998)
- Dr. Maya Angelou (1997)
- Congressman Pat Schroeder (1996)
- Governor Ann Richards (1995)
- Sandra Gillis (1994)
- Governor Barbara Roberts (1993)
- Senator Paul Tsongas (1992)
- Congressman Barney Frank (1991)
- Congresswoman Eleanor H. Norton (1990)
- Joe Steffan (1990)
- Senator Craig Washington (1989)
- Morgan Fairchild (1988)
- Congressman Gary Studds (1987)
- Harry Britt (1986)
- Vivian Shapiro (1985)
- David Goodstein (1984)
- Congressman Bill Green (1983)
- Virginia Apuzzo (1983)
- Joel Wachs (1982)

In addition to the keynote speaker, the dinner often includes other celebrity entertainment. Recent dinners have included such entertainers as Deborah Cox, Kim Petras, Todrick Hall, Patti LaBelle, Dana Goldberg, Mickey Guyton, Leslie Jordan, Caroline Rhea, Robert Gant, Peter Paige, Sharon Gless, Neil Meron, Craig Zadan, Leisha Hailey, Pam Grier, Beth Grant and Ross Mathews.

== See also ==
- LGBT rights in Texas
