= Dana Goldberg (comedian) =

American comedian (born 1976)

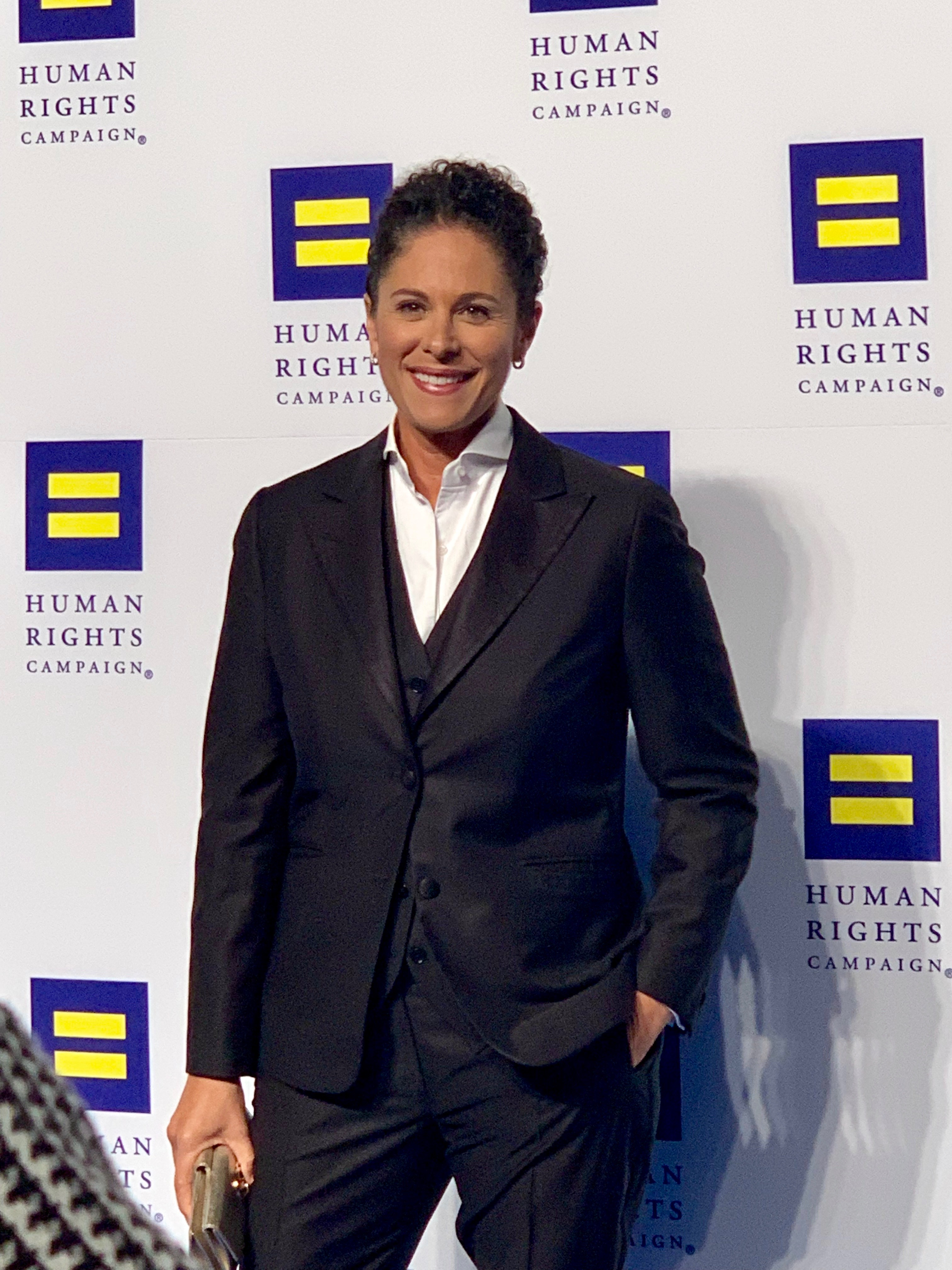
- Dana Goldberg at HRC Gala
- Born: 1976 (age 49–50); Albuquerque, New Mexico
- Occupation: Comedian

Dana Goldberg (born 1976) is an American comedian. She is especially known in the gay community, as Goldberg herself is gay. She is a weekly guest on The Stephanie Miller Show on SiriusXM and co-hosts “The Daily Beans” podcast as well as hosting her own podcast, Out in Left Field With Dana Goldberg on Advocate.com. She hosts an annual show in Albuquerque, New Mexico. In 2013, she was named a finalist in the Advocate's Stand Out: The National Queer Comedy Search. In 2017, she hosted the Los Angeles Resist March. Also in 2017, she performed at Trevor Live in New York City on a bill featuring John Oliver and Imagine Dragons. In 2019, she spoke at Lambda Legal's annual National Liberty Awards. In television, Goldberg has appeared on LOGO with her comedy special One Night Stand Up: Episode 4, filmed at San Francisco's Great American Music Hall. In 2025 Goldberg was selected as one of Out magazine's "Out100" most active and influential LGBTQ+ people.

== Early life ==
Goldberg was raised in a single-parent Jewish household with a brother and a sister in Albuquerque, New Mexico. She came out as gay at age 18. One of her siblings, her brother, is also gay. She and her mother began receiving feedback on her humor when she was five, when her kindergarten teacher told her mother that Goldberg "was the funniest five-year-old" she had ever met. She also had a musical bent, playing drums for many years, eventually auditioning for STOMP in 2001, first auditioning in San Francisco. She was selected for a call-back with a group of 125 out of 2,000, which took her to New York, though she did not make the final cut. (I Love My Wife podcast, Episode 54, 30:43).

== Education ==
Goldberg holds a degree in physical education.

== Career ==
Goldberg's early comedy influences were Whoopi Goldberg and Billy Crystal. She first performed her comedy at age 17 in her high school talent show. She was selected as its winner. She launched her career around 2000, when she was 26, and her first professional show, the philanthropic scholarship-raising Funny Lesbians For A Change, occurred in 2003 in Albuquerque. Early in her career, Goldberg traveled with a group of 13 comedians to perform as part of the U.S. Comedy Invasion at the Edinburgh Fringe Festival. The death of her father in 2008 propelled her to "take the chance" on comedy by quitting her bartending job to pursue stand-up full-time.

In 2014, Goldberg performed at Black Tie Dinner, with 3,500 people in attendance and over $140,000 raised for charity in its live auction.

In 2017, Goldberg performed at the inaugural Portland Queer Comedy Festival.

In 2018, Goldberg appeared in the film Genesis: The Future of Mankind Is Woman alongside Meredith Baxter, Robert Romanus, and Suzanne Westenhoefer. Also in 2018, Goldberg was interviewed on the podcast LGBTQ&A, created and hosted by Jeffrey Masters, podcast director at the Advocate and Out. In September 2018, she emceed Equality California's Equality Awards.

In 2019, Goldberg performed at the Beverly Hills Bar Association. She also reprised her 2014 role at Black Tie Dinner, hosting the event's live auction. In addition, she performed at the Human Rights Campaign's Los Angeles Dinner along with Betty Who and Shea Diamond.

== Philanthropy ==
Goldberg is a regular attendee at major Human Rights Campaign events, at which she has also served as emcee. She has also emceed Trevor Project and GLAAD events. Through performing standup, she has helped raise money for HIV/AIDS causes, such as shows in benefit of the AIDS Foundation. She has also performed at Caroline's on Broadway to benefit the Lesbian Political Action Committee (LPAC).

== Discography ==
Title
Dana Goldberg: Crossing the Line
Dana Goldberg: Hot and Bothered

== Podcasts ==
Date	Show	Episode	Role
Nov. 2019	The Dean Obeidallah Show	"'What Just Happened?!' with Dana Goldberg & Scott Blakeman"	Guest
Nov. 21, 2019	Walk-Ins Welcome w/ Bridget Phetasy	"#58: Dana Goldberg Maintains that Comics Say What Most People are Thinking"	Guest
Jan. 31, 2019	I Love My Wife	"EP 54: Comedian Dana Goldberg chats about comedy, touring and her work in the LGBTQ non-profit world"	Guest
June 6, 2019 – present	Out in Left Field with Dana Goldberg	n/a	Host
Feb. 5, 2018	LGBTQ&A	"Dana Goldberg: In Defense of Scissoring"	Guest
