= Jennifer Chrisler =

American activist and college president

9th President of Hampshire College
- Incumbent
- Assumed office 2025

Personal details
- Children: 3
- Education: Smith College

Jennifer Chrisler is the 9th president of Hampshire College, a private liberal arts institution in Amherst, Massachusetts. From 2005 to 2013, she was executive director of the Family Equality Council, a nonprofit LGBTQ advocacy and education organization based in the United States that was previously known as the Family Pride Coalition.

== Early life and education ==
Chrisler was raised in upstate New York, in what she described as "an all-white, pretty much all-Protestant, working-class community." During high school, she was interested in becoming a wedding planner. In 1988, she began attending Smith College, and during college, began to learn about social justice issues and became involved in campus efforts to support diversity. She came out as a lesbian to her mother while she was a student at Smith. After completing her bachelor's degree, she continued at Smith to complete a master's degree and then moved to Boston in 1993.

== Career ==
In 1993, Chrisler began her political career as staff in the Massachusetts state Senate, working for state senator Cheryl Jacques for three years, first as office manager and then staff director. In 1996, she moved on to work for American Science & Engineering as director of corporate communications and then worked as a director of operations for a private venture fund. She then became the finance director for the unsuccessful 2001 campaign for Massachusetts's 9th congressional district by Jacques, and afterwards became employed as a fundraiser for the Freedom to Marry Coalition of Massachusetts.

Chrisler moved to Washington, D.C. after Jacques became the executive director of the Human Rights Campaign, and they married in Massachusetts in 2004, where they had maintained residency and gay marriage was recognized at the time. Chrisler became the executive director of the Family Equality Council in 2005, when the organization was known as the Family Pride Coalition, after spending three years at home with their twin children.

As executive director of the Family Equality Council, Chrisler engaged in advocacy on behalf of LGBTQ parents raising children, training for families on how to lobby for civil rights, and lobbying for a variety of issues, including anti-discrimination legislation, adoption rights, hospital visitation rights, and gender-neutral passport applications.

In 2006, as executive director of the Family Equality Council, Chrisler was an organizer of efforts to help ensure participation of LGBTQ parents in the annual White House Easter Egg Roll, when tickets were distributed on a first-come, first-served basis to the public willing and able to wait in long lines in advance of the event. Chrisler told the Associated Press, "Showing up, participating fully in an American tradition, showing Americans that we do exist, that in our minds isn't a protest." In 2007, she again participated with her family and other families with LGBTQ parents. In 2009, families with LGBTQ parents were invited to the egg roll by the Obama administration, with tickets distributed directly to the Family Equality Council and other advocacy groups.

During her tenure as executive director, the Family Equality Council also organized Family Week in Provincetown, Massachusetts. In 2012, Chrisler invited Family Research Council president Tony Perkins to meet her family at their home, telling CNN her goal was to "open his heart a little bit" about gay parents and marriage, but he declined. In 2013, she announced her retirement from the Family Equality Council.

From 2013 to 2018, she was the vice president for alumnae relations at Smith College, and then was vice chancellor for university advancement at the University of Massachusetts Dartmouth before she became the chief advancement officer at Hampshire College in 2019. In 2024, she was named Vice President for Institutional Support at Hampshire College, a role where she led fundraising work along with many other efforts related to alumni and public relations.

In June 2025, she was appointed interim president of Hampshire College. In October 2025, she was appointed as the college's ninth president. On April 14, 2026, the college's leaders announced that it would close after the autumn 2026 semester, citing unresolved financial and accreditation pressures, along with a steep decline in enrollment.

== Personal life ==
Chrisler shares twin children, born in 2002, and a third child born in 2012, with her wife Cheryl Jacques.
