= Kelley Robinson =

American community organizer and president of Human Rights Campaign

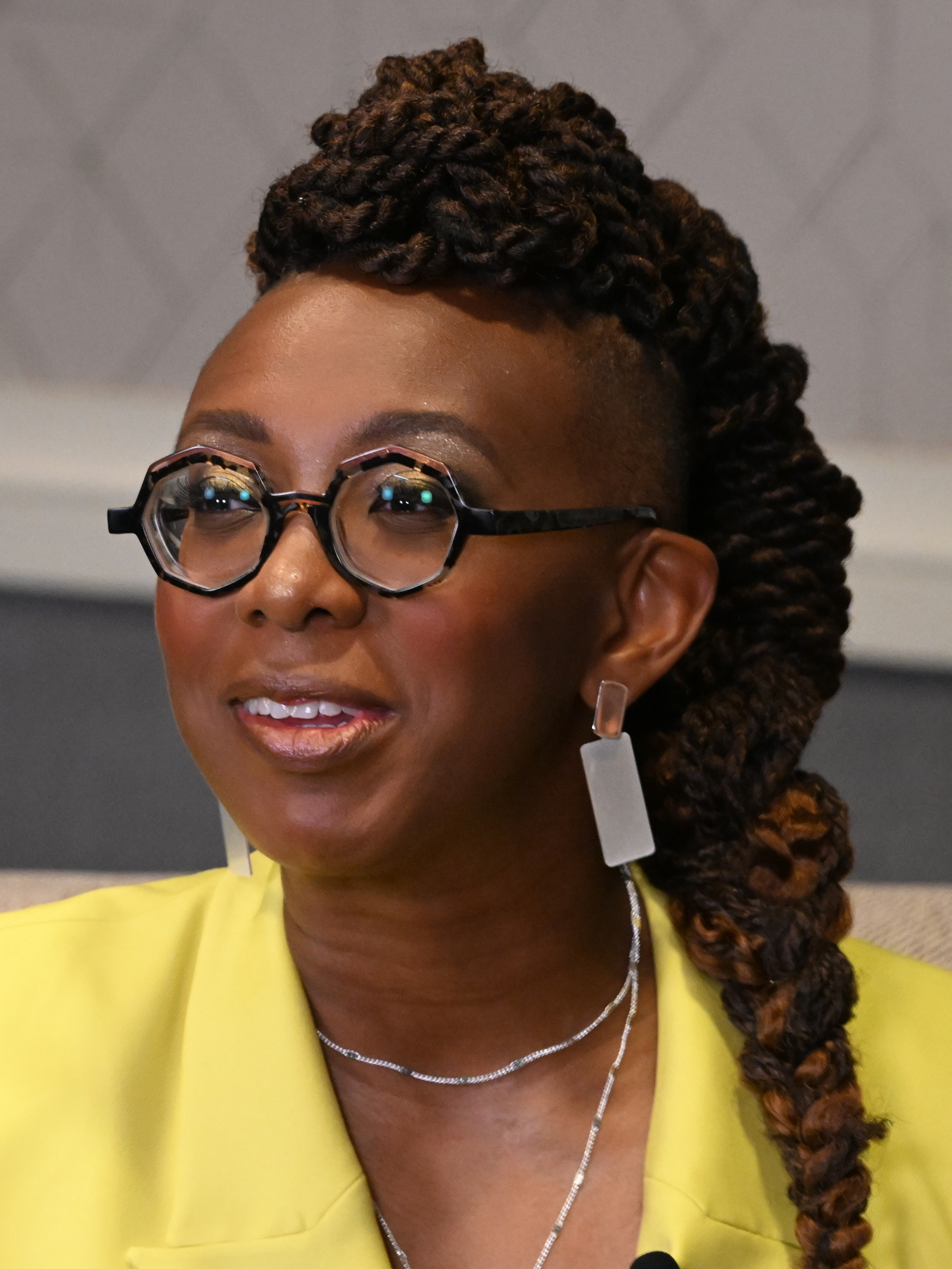
- Robinson at the 2025 Human Rights Campaign National Dinner
- Born: 1985 or 1986 (age 40–41)
- Education: University of Missouri, Columbia (BA)

Kelley J. Robinson (born 1985 or 1986) is an American community organizer and nonprofit executive who is the current president of the Human Rights Campaign. She was formerly the executive director of Planned Parenthood Action Fund.

== Education ==
Robinson received a Bachelor of Arts degree from the University of Missouri-Columbia in 2008. During university, she double-majored in sociology and women's and gender studies. She has also worked as a mixed martial arts fighter and a bartender.

== Career ==
Robinson started working as a political organizer for Barack Obama's presidential campaign in 2008.

In 2009, she worked at Planned Parenthood of the Heartland as a regional organizer. From 2011 to 2015, she served as the associate director for youth engagement for Planned Parenthood Federation of America, until she was promoted to national organizing director in 2015. In 2019, she became the executive director of the Planned Parenthood Action Fund and vice president of organizing and advocacy. In this role, Robinson helped direct efforts to flip the U.S. Senate in the 2020 elections. While at Planned Parenthood, the number of supporters increased from 6.5 million to 18 million.

As the executive director of the Planned Parenthood Action Fund, Robinson was interviewed about reproductive rights, the Hyde Amendment, and Supreme Court nominees by several media outlets such as the Associated Press, CNN, The Guardian, and The New York Times.

Robinson became the president of the Human Rights Campaign (HRC) in late 2022. She is the first queer Black woman to lead the organization. Robinson has stated that she will focus on issues such as voting rights, reproductive rights, LGBTQ+ rights, living wages and health care; she will focus on the voices and concerns of impoverished people. In one interview, Robinson stated that HRC was planning to work towards the passage of the Respect for Marriage Act. In one of the first interviews that she gave as HRC president, to El País, Robinson addressed the rise of hate acts against LGBTQ communities. In the month of December of the year 2022, Robinson testified before Congress on the rise of anti-LGBTQ+ extremism and violence.

Robinson is a senior fellow at the Kettering Foundation, an American non-partisan research foundation.

== Awards and recognition ==
In April 2024, Robinson was included in the Time 100 list of the most influential people of the year.

== Personal life ==
Robinson married her wife, Becky George, in 2020; they raise one child together. Robinson is Catholic.
