= Alphonso David =

American attorney (born 1970)

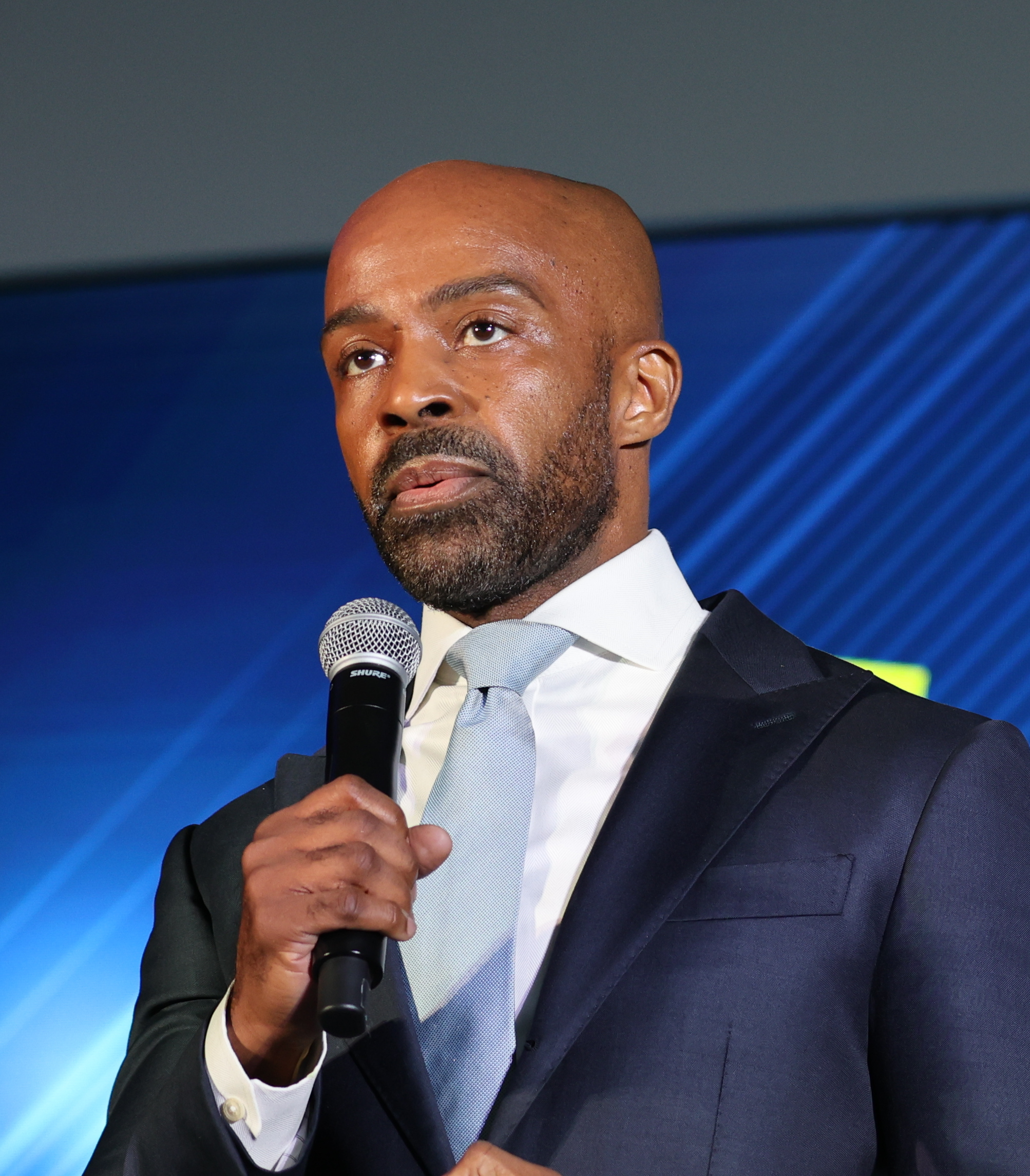
- Born: Alphonso David; 1970 (age 55–56); Silver Spring, Maryland, U.S.
- Education: University of Maryland, College Park (BA); Temple University (JD)
- Occupations: Lawyer and Executive Officer
- Known for: President and CEO of the Global Black Economic Forum; Former president of Human Rights Campaign; Civil rights attorney
- Relatives: William Tolbert (great-uncle)

Alphonso David (born 1970) is an American lawyer, LGBT civil rights activist, former president of the Human Rights Campaign, and current president and CEO of the Global Black Economic Forum. In August 2019, he became the president of the Human Rights Campaign. He was the first civil rights lawyer and first person of color to serve as president of the organization, but was fired from his role as president on September 6, 2021, after it was revealed that he advised former New York Governor Andrew Cuomo when he was accused of sexually assaulting women. He made national headlines in 2022 for bringing litigation against the Human Rights Campaign alleging racial bias in his firing. On March 15, 2023, the Human Rights Campaign said it had settled the lawsuit and stated that the terms of the settlement were confidential.

On June 30, 2022, David was announced as the president and CEO of the Global Black Economic Forum, an organization working "to serve and advocate on behalf of the economic needs of the Black community."

== Early life ==
David, who is of Americo-Liberian heritage, was born in Silver Spring, Maryland. His family moved back to Monrovia, Liberia, when he was one year old. In 1977, David's father was elected mayor of Monrovia while his great uncle, William Tolbert, was President of Liberia. During the 1980 Liberian coup d'état, Tolbert was assassinated and David's father was incarcerated. His family lived under house arrest for 18 months and sought political asylum in the United States when he was 10 years old.

== Education ==
David graduated from the University of Maryland, College Park in 1992 and Temple University Law School in 2000. While at Temple, David was a member of the university's national trial team and the Political and Civil Rights Law Review.

== Career ==
=== Early career ===
After graduation David worked as a judicial law clerk for Clifford Scott Green, a Judge of the United States District Court for the Eastern District of Pennsylvania. He then joined Blank Rome LLP, a national law firm based in Philadelphia, to work as a litigation associate. At the time, he was also heavily involved in pro bono work, specifically to help victims of domestic violence.

=== Civil rights litigation ===
From 2004 to 2007, David served as a staff attorney at the Lambda Legal Defense and Educational Fund. He worked on lesbian, gay, bisexual and transgender-centered cases around the country involving issues like HIV, employment, and housing accommodations. David then worked on New York's first marriage equality case, Hernandez v. Robles; they won at the trial court but lost on appeal. After three years with Lambda Legal, David joined Attorney General Andrew Cuomo's Office as Bureau Chief for Civil Rights where he managed and prosecuted cases statewide ranging from deceptive business practices to immigration fraud.

=== Counsel to New York Governor Cuomo ===
David served for four years in the Governor's cabinet as the Deputy Secretary and Counsel for Civil Rights, the first position of its kind in New York State. There, he worked on a range of legal, policy, legislative and operational matters affecting civil rights and labor throughout the state.

In 2015, David was appointed by Governor Andrew Cuomo to serve as Counsel to the Governor. He thus functioned as the Governor's chief counsel and principal legal advisor and oversaw all significant legal and policy deliberations affecting New York State, including evaluating proposed legislation, implementing laws and policies, and formulating the State's posture in both affirmative and defensive litigation. He also worked on landmark legislation and policy including the Marriage Equality Act, which removed legal barriers permitting same-sex couples to marry; the Workers Compensation Reform Act, which modernized key components of the program to ensure greater accountability and functionality; the Paid Family Leave Act, which ensures individuals leave to care for a sick family member; and the Minority and Women Business Program, which expanded contracting opportunities for MWBEs throughout the state.

In New York Attorney General Letitia James's independent investigation of allegations of sexual harassment by Cuomo, which was released in August 2021, there is some discussion of David's role in providing the personnel files of former Cuomo advisor Lindsey Boylan to the governor's office, which were then leaked to the press in an attempt to discredit her. The report also states that David helped to draft a letter to defend Cuomo and question Boylan's motivations. The letter was not published.

=== President of the Human Rights Campaign ===
Human Rights Campaign logo

In August 2019, after 12 years with the New York State government, David became president of the Human Rights Campaign (HRC). A report then released in August 2021, following an independent investigation led by James described David's efforts to cover up sexual harassment claims against Governor Andrew Cuomo and undermine the credibility of accusers. On September 6, 2021, David was fired as president of HRC.

In February 2022, David filed a lawsuit against the HRC, alleging discrimination. On March 15, 2023, HRC and David issued a joint statement that both parties had "chosen to amicably resolve" the lawsuit and that the terms of the settlement were confidential.

=== President and CEO of the Global Black Economic Forum ===
David was announced as the president and CEO of the Global Black Economic Forum on June 30, 2022. There, he oversaw the creation of the Business Summit, the coalition group known as the Council for Economic Opportunity & Social Justice, among other programs and initiatives. He has also been outspoken about issues like affirmative action, including one commentary published by U.S. News & World Report in June, 2023 and another by Fortune in July, 2023. Additionally, he spoke at the National Mall during the August 2023 commemoration of the 60th anniversary of Rev. Martin Luther King Jr.'s March on Washington.

In 2023, David was also the legal counsel to the Fearless Fund, a venture capital fund dedicated to supporting Black women-owned businesses, which faced a lawsuit alleging racial discrimination.

== Personal life ==
David has worked as an adjunct professor of law. He is openly gay.

== Awards and honors ==
In May 2017, David received the Public Servant of the Year Award from the Metropolitan Black Bar Association for his advocacy.

In February 2018, the Asian American Bar Association bestowed its public service award on David.

In September 2019, David received a public appreciation recognition from the Chief Judge of New York State, on behalf of the Indigent Legal Services Board, for his "extraordinary contributions to improving the quality of mandated representation in New York State.

In June 2020, in honor of the 50th anniversary of the first LGBTQ Pride parade, Queerty named him among the fifty heroes "leading the nation toward equality, acceptance, and dignity for all people".

In February 2023, David was named one of 50 Notable Black Leaders by Crain's New York Business in part for his work "reimagining equity and inclusion in corporate America."

Human Rights Campaign
Preceded by Chad Griffin	President of the Human Rights Campaign; 2019–2021	Succeeded by Joni Madison; Acting
