= Elizabeth Birch =

American lawyer and businesswoman

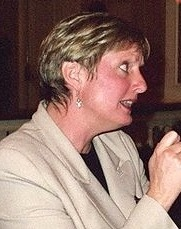
- Birch in 1998
- Born: September 2, 1956 (age 69); Dayton, Ohio, U.S.
- Education: University of Hawaiʻi at Mānoa (BA, PhD); Santa Clara University (JD)
- Occupation: Attorney
- Known for: Former corporate executive who chaired the board of directors of the National Gay and Lesbian Task Force; Executive Director of the Human Rights Campaign

Elizabeth Millen Birch (born September 2, 1956) is an American attorney and former corporate executive who chaired the board of directors of the National Gay and Lesbian Task Force from 1992 to 1994. She served as the executive director of the Human Rights Campaign, the nation's largest LGBT organization, from January 1995 until January 2004.

== Education and law career ==
Birch was born at Wright-Patterson Air Force Base in Dayton, Ohio, in 1956. Her father was a Canadian Air Force officer and she lived on numerous Canadian Air Force bases in her youth. During high school, she joined Up With People, a student performance group, and toured Europe and North Africa for a year. Birch graduated from the University of Hawaiʻi in 1980 and earned a Juris Doctor degree at the Santa Clara University School of Law. She was an associate attorney with the law firm of McCutchen, Doyle, Brown & Enersen until joining Apple in 1989. She later earned a Ph.D. from the University of Hawaiʻi in 2004.

Birch was worldwide director of litigation for Apple Computer and general counsel for its Claris subsidiary until 1995.

== Activism ==
Birch began her LGBTQ political activity as a member of the Bay Area Municipal Elections Committee (BAYMEC), an LGBTQ political action committee based in a San Jose, California. She was co-chairwoman of the National Gay and Lesbian Task Force from 1992 to 1994.

Birch joined the Human Rights Campaign (HRC) as executive director in January 1995. Over the next several years she dramatically increased its size in both membership and budget. Her marketing approach to political organization provoked criticism that HRC was setting an agenda through its influence on sources of funding to the exclusion of local initiatives. In 2003, the organization opened its national headquarters building in Washington, D.C. During her tenure, a major problem arose when the HRC endorsed New York Senator Al D'Amato for re-election in 1998 when he was opposed by Chuck Schumer. Birch was executive director of the HRC until January 2004 when she left to spend more time with her partner, Hilary Rosen, and their children. She joined the Howard Dean presidential campaign as a senior advisor. She then became a professional public speaker.

Birch was still the executive director of HRC when its staff and board of directors, with her encouragement, "discussed and then finally decided to add the 'T' to the organization’s mission statement" in 2001, although the organization still supported the non-transgender version of ENDA, saying that it did not have a chance to pass into law if transgender protections were added; the HRC modified this stance in August 2004.

In 2000, Birch became the first leader of an LGBTQ organization to address a national political convention when she gave a prime-time speech at the Democratic National Convention.

== Later career ==
In 2004, Birch launched Birch & Company, a consulting firm, with offices in Washington, D.C., and New York. Birch ran Rosie O'Donnell's production company, KidRo Productions, Inc. and oversaw O'Donnell's Foundation, The For All Kids Foundation until 2007.

Birch also hosts a talk show on here!. Her guests have included Howard Dean, Pat Buchanan, Rosie O'Donnell and John Lewis.

== Personal life ==
She had a relationship with Hilary Rosen, former chief executive of the Recording Industry Association of America. They adopted twins, a boy and a girl, in Texas. The couple separated in 2006.

== Elizabeth Birch Equality Award ==
Black Tie Dinner, the largest LGBTQ fund-raising dinner in the Nation, presents an annual award in Birch's honor called the Elizabeth Birch Equality Award. The award is given annually to an individual, organization, or company that has made a significant contribution of national scope to the LGBTQ community. Elizabeth Birch was the first recipient of the award in 2004, and later returned to the dinner in 2009 to present the award to Judy Shepard. The Black Tie Dinner is held annually in Dallas, Texas.

Human Rights Campaign
Preceded by Tim McFeeley	Executive Director; January 1995 – January 2004	Succeeded by Cheryl Jacques
