= Tim McFeeley =

American lawyer and gay activist

Tim McFeeley (born 1946) is an American lawyer and gay activist. Formerly the executive director of the Center for Policy Alternatives (CPA), a progressive political non profit, he is currently a Vice President of national executive search firm Isaacson, Miller. He joined Isaacson, Miller in 2008 where his practice mainly focuses on the legal, advocacy, and public policy sectors.

McFeeley received his bachelor's degree from Princeton University and his J.D. from Harvard Law School. He practiced law in Boston for 17 years, first as an associate at a mid-sized law firm and later as corporate counsel for National Medical Care, Inc., an organization that provided a variety of specialized health care services and products.

In Boston, McFeeley was active in civic and political activities and served on the boards of directors of Gay & Lesbian Advocates and Defenders and Boston Aging Concerns. McFeeley was a founder of both the Boston Lesbian and Gay Political Alliance and Bay State Stonewall Democrats.

From 1989 to 1995, McFeeley served as executive director of the Human Rights Campaign Fund, a national gay activist organization. In 1993 McFeeley directed HRCF's endeavors to lift the ban against gay and lesbian members of the Armed Services, an unsuccessful effort that led to the "don't ask, don't tell" policy. During that spring, McFeeley was part of the first delegation of gay and lesbian leaders to meet with the president, Bill Clinton, in the Oval Office.

Following his departure from HRCF in January 1995, McFeeley provided consulting services to a variety of for-profit and nonprofit organizations, including the National Senior Citizens Law Center, Common Cause, the National Association of Commissions for Women, and the National Stonewall Democrats. Since January 2001, McFeeley has served as Political Director for the National Gay and Lesbian Task Force.

McFeeley authored The Price of Access, a book that describes and analyzes the federal end-stage renal disease program.

McFeeley resides in Washington, D.C., and Provincetown, Massachusetts, with his spouse, Robert J. Mondzak.

Human Rights Campaign
Preceded by Vic Basile	Executive Director; June 1989 – January 1995	Succeeded by Elizabeth Birch
