= Gay Rights National Lobby =

Former American gay rights organization

The Gay Rights National Lobby was a Washington D.C.–based gay rights advocacy organization which existed in the late 1970s into the early 1980s. It was founded in 1976, and both GRNL and the National Gay and Lesbian Task Force were among the earliest organizations to engage in lobbying legislators for lesbian and gay rights.

== History ==
Among notable members were Steve Endean, the one-time Director of the GRNL (1978-?) who established the Human Rights Campaign Fund (now the Human Rights Campaign) in 1980 to raise funds for gay-supportive congressional candidates, and former Maryland Republican congressman Robert Bauman, who had been outed in 1980 by a sex scandal and lost his seat before briefly becoming a lobbyist for the GRNL.

Among its campaigns alongside the NGLTF was the successful campaign against the "Family Protection Act", a proposed legislation against gay people promoted by the Reagan administration from 1981 to 1982.

The GRNL merged with the HRC in 1985, bringing with it many lobbyists and establishing the HRC as the premiere LGBT rights lobbying organization at the federal level in the United States for some time to come. In October 1986, the HRC created two separate organizations, the HRC Foundation (as an educational arm) and the HRC PAC (the campaign fundraising arm), in order to focus the HRC proper on lobbying efforts in the spirit of the GRNL.
