= Chad Griffin =

American political activist (born 1973)

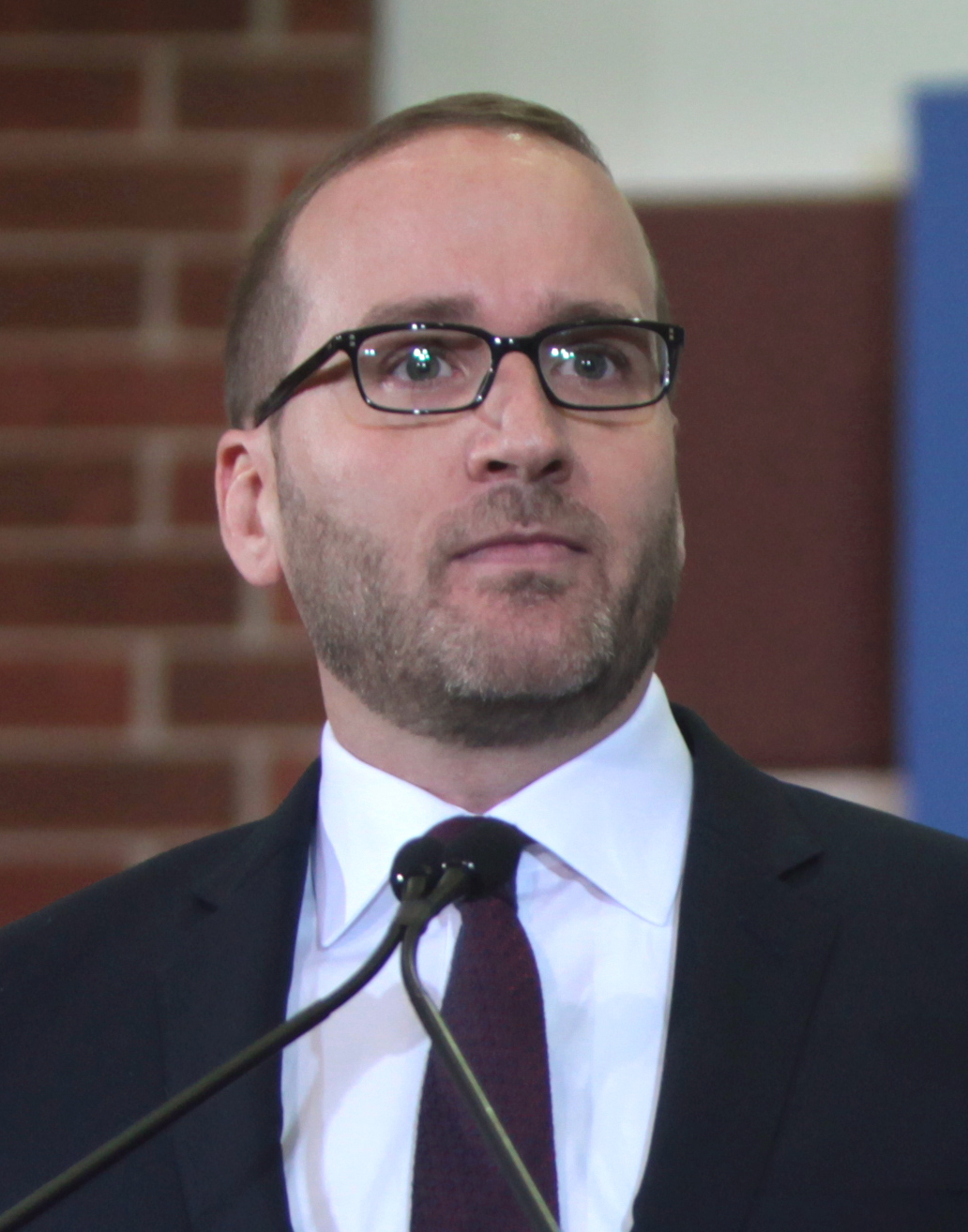
- Born: Chad Hunter Griffin; July 16, 1973 (age 52); Hope, Arkansas, U.S.
- Education: Georgetown University (BA)
- Occupation: Political strategist
- Known for: Founding president of the American Foundation for Equal Rights; Former president of Human Rights Campaign

Chad Hunter Griffin (born July 16, 1973) is an American political strategist best known for his work advocating for LGBT rights in the United States.

Griffin got his start in politics volunteering for the Bill Clinton presidential campaign, which led to a position in the White House Press Office at the age of 19. Following his stint in the White House and his graduation from Georgetown University, he led a number of political campaigns advocating for or against various California ballot initiatives, as well as a number of fundraising efforts for political candidates, such as Hillary Clinton and Barack Obama.

Following the 2008 passage of California's highly publicized Proposition 8, which barred the recognition of same-sex marriage, Griffin founded the American Foundation for Equal Rights (AFER) to overturn the law. AFER's challenge, Perry v. Brown, was ultimately successful following a decision by the United States Supreme Court in June 2013. Griffin served as president of the Human Rights Campaign, the largest LGBTQ rights organization in the United States, from 2012 to 2019.

== Early years ==
Griffin was born in Hope, Arkansas, and grew up 45 miles (72 km) to the northeast in Arkadelphia. While attending Ouachita Baptist University, he volunteered for the 1992 presidential campaign of Bill Clinton. Following the election, he was hired by Dee Dee Myers to join the transition team and administration. Griffin dropped out of college and became, at the age of 19, the youngest-ever member of a presidential staff. He worked as a White House Press Office manager for two years. There, he also acted as White House liaison to the 1995 film The American President, where he met producer Rob Reiner.

Griffin went on to lead Reiner's charitable foundation. He worked with Reiner on numerous political efforts, including the founding of the American Foundation for Equal Rights (AFER). AFER is a nonprofit organization formed to challenge the federal constitutionality of California's Proposition 8, which limited legal marriage in the state to opposite-sex couples.

Griffin transferred to Georgetown University after leaving the White House, enrolling in the Edmund A. Walsh School of Foreign Service, graduating in 1997. Griffin was also a part of Griffin Schake, a consulting firm that he founded with Kristina Schake, former communications director for Michelle Obama.

== LGBT rights activism ==
Griffin, who is gay, is best known for his work advocating for LGBTQ rights. He has often cited the high rate of suicide among gay teens as motivation. In 2008, Griffin was selected as one of The Advocate's People of the Year. In 2013, Griffin was ranked 16th on Out magazine's "Power 50" list of the 50-most powerful LGBTQ individuals in the United States. He had moved up each year from 2010, when he ranked as #29; he ranked as #28 in 2011, and #16 in 2013.

=== American Foundation for Equal Rights ===
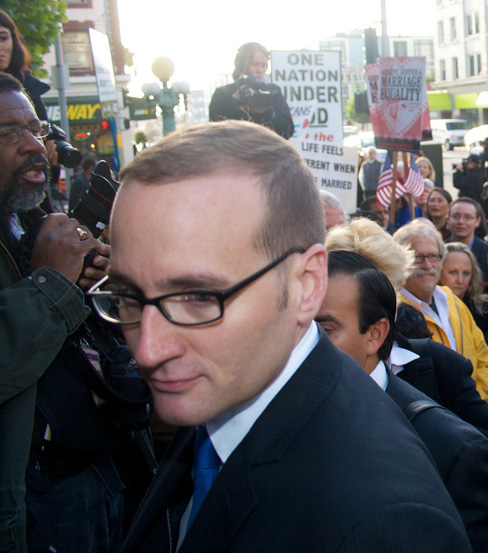
Griffin outside the Ninth Circuit Court in 2014

Griffin and Reiner founded AFER in 2008 to challenge the federal constitutionality of California's Proposition 8. Prior to AFER's founding, Griffin had raised funds and produced television ads for the "No on 8" campaign. This was Griffin's first professional work on LGBTQ rights. Following Proposition 8's passage in 2008, Griffin and Reiner reflected on the No campaign's failure, and the possibility of mounting a federal legal challenge. An acquaintance suggested speaking to conservative lawyer Theodore Olson, who supported the challenge and soon began research on the case. Griffin believed the case, and Olson's support, created an opportunity to frame the same-sex marriage debate in nonpartisan terms. Olson later suggested recruiting liberal David Boies as co-counsel; the two had previously litigated opposite sides of Bush v. Gore. Griffin approached Boies, who quickly accepted.

Meanwhile, Griffin began discussing the potential case with other LGBTQ rights organizations. The American Civil Liberties Union, Lambda Legal, and the National Center for Lesbian Rights opposed a federal lawsuit, seeing it as a "reckless" action, as they were worried that a loss at the Supreme Court could be "devastating" to the cause. As the case progressed, these same groups asked to intervene in the lawsuit, an attempt which Griffin fought and which was ultimately unsuccessful. In a letter to the leaders of those organizations, Griffin wrote, "You have unrelentingly and unequivocally acted to undermine this case even before it was filed. In light of this, it is inconceivable that you would zealously and effectively litigate this case if you were successful in intervening." Griffin also believed that such intervention would complicate the trial, making it less efficient and would, as a result, ultimately weaken their case.

In May 2009 AFER filed their lawsuit, now styled Hollingsworth v. Perry, which argued that Proposition 8 was unconstitutional on equal protection and due process grounds. It also announced the founding of the organization. The lawsuit's plaintiffs are two same-sex couples, Kristin Perry and Sandra Stier, Paul Katami and Jeffrey Zarrillo. Governor of California Jerry Brown and other state officials are listed as defendants in their official capacities. Perry was successful at district court and at the 9th Circuit Court of Appeals. In December 2012, the Supreme Court agreed to review the 9th Circuit ruling. In June 2013, it held that the proponents of Proposition 8 had lacked standing for their appeals to the 9th Circuit and Supreme Court, which left the district court ruling intact. On June 28, California resumed marrying same-sex couples.

=== Other LGBT-related activism ===
Logo of the Human Rights Campaign. Griffin became its president in 2012.

In 2012, Griffin was selected to succeed Joe Solmonese as president of the Human Rights Campaign, the largest LGBTQ advocacy and political lobbying organization in the United States. His appointment was well received by many in the LGBTQ community, including Cleve Jones, R. Clarke Cooper, and Transgender Law Center executive director Masen Davis. Griffin assumed his new role on June 11, 2012. Griffin left his role as HRC's president in 2019 and was succeeded by Alphonso David.

In May 2012, Griffin asked a question which, in part, led Vice President Joe Biden to publicly share his support for same-sex marriage. In a May 2012 Meet the Press appearance, Biden recounted that, at a private dinner with LGBTQ campaign donors, he had been asked "How do you feel about us?" The dinner was being held at the home of a gay couple and their two children, and Biden told the parents: "I wish everybody could see this. All you got to do is look in the eyes of those kids. And no one can wonder... whether or not they are cared for and nurtured and loved and reinforced. And folks, what's happening is, everybody is beginning to see it." Barack Obama announced his own support a few days later, becoming the first sitting United States president to do so.

Griffin was one of several executive producers of the 2009 documentary Outrage, which investigated allegations of homosexuality among a series of political figures who had worked against LGBTQ rights. Griffin was selected to help raise funds for its production.

== Other work ==
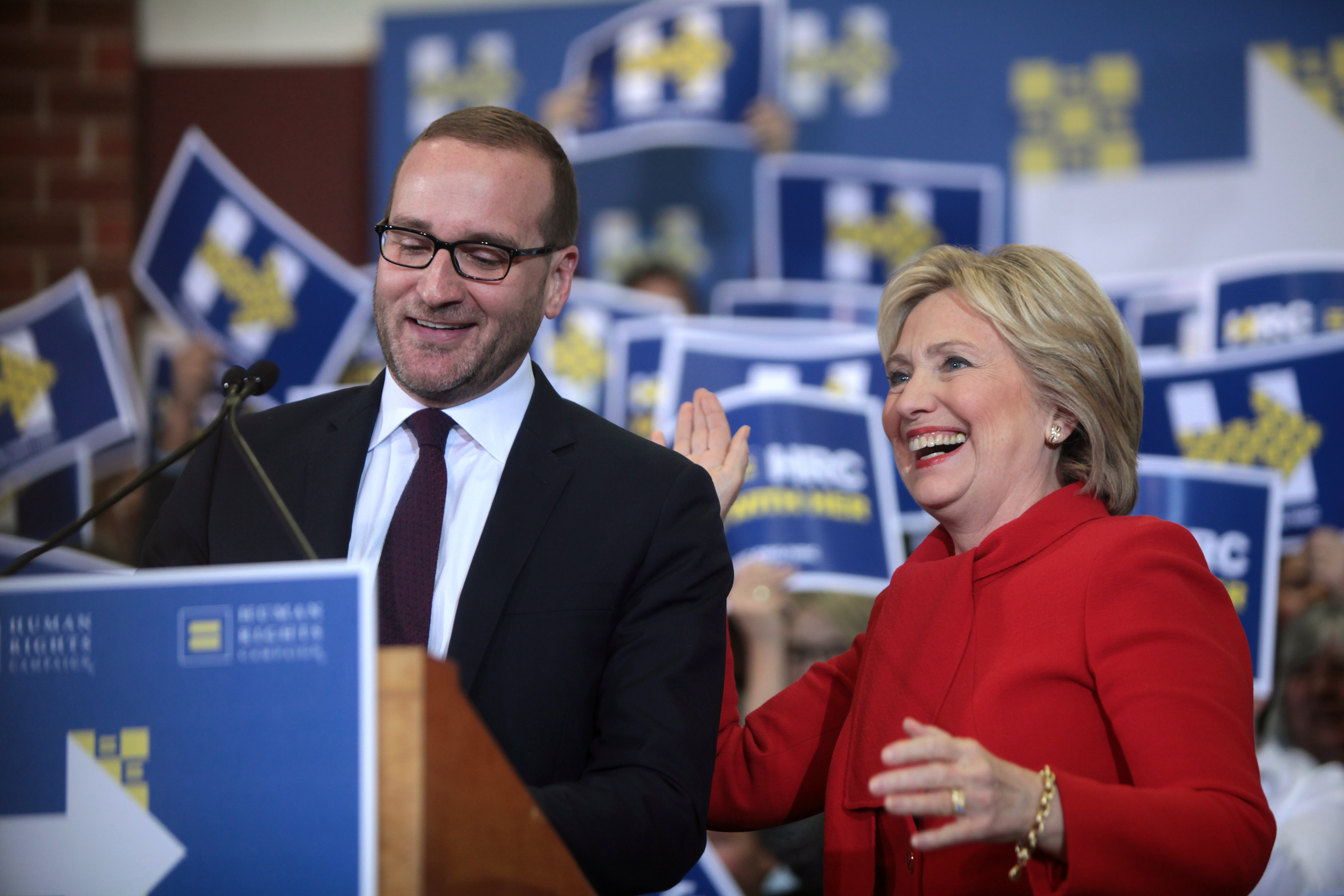
Griffin introducing 2016 presidential candidate Hillary Clinton at a "Get Out the Caucus" rally at Valley Southwoods Freshman High School in West Des Moines, Iowa.

Prior to his work opposing Proposition 8, Griffin has been involved in supporting or opposing a variety of other California ballot initiatives. In 1998, Reiner hired Griffin to lead an effort to pass California Proposition 10. Proposition 10 created a tax on cigarettes and other tobacco products sold in California, and directed that income toward early childhood education efforts under the First 5 California Commission. That commission's executive director, Kristin Perry, later became the named plaintiff in Perry v. Brown. In 2004, Griffin was campaign director for California Proposition 71, which authorized the sale of three billion dollars in general obligation bonds to fund stem cell research. Two years later, Griffin led the unsuccessful campaign for passage of California Proposition 87, which would have established a tax on oil extraction in the state. Funds were to have been used to for alternative energy and energy efficiency efforts. Prior to these initiatives, in 2003, Griffin ran the Rally to Save Ahmanson Ranch, which successfully advocated for wilderness protection of what became the Upper Las Virgenes Canyon Open Space Preserve. Jason Schwartzman shadowed Griffin during this campaign in preparation for Schwartzman's role as the head of an environmental group in the 2004 film I Heart Huckabees.

Griffin's recent work also includes political fundraising for candidates; his clients have included Hillary Clinton and Barack Obama. He was a member of the national finance committee for Obama's 2012 reelection campaign, and raised over $300,000 in that effort. Griffin also sits on the board of Brad Pitt's Make It Right Foundation New Orleans, which works to build houses for those who lost homes in New Orleans to Hurricane Katrina.

== Personal life ==
Griffin attended a White House dinner in 2012. He began dating longtime friend Charlie Joughin in 2015.

Human Rights Campaign
Preceded by Joe Solmonese	President; June 11, 2012 – August 2019	Succeeded by Alphonso David
