= Global Black Economic Forum =

International organization

- Formation: 2017
- Founder: Richelieu Dennis
- CEO and President: Alphonso David
- Website: gbef.com

The Global Black Economic Forum is an international organization focused on issues at the intersection of economic and racial justice, specifically with regard to the Black diaspora. Founded by entrepreneur Richelieu Dennis and headed by lawyer Alphonso David as its president and CEO, it hosts summits, trains leaders and institutions, and conducts policy research and advocacy. It also frequently collaborates with other organizations, such as U.S. News & World Report, on new initiatives and programs.

== History ==
The Global Black Economic Forum was founded in 2017 in order to provide awareness of and collectively organize "the worldwide economic power that exists in the diaspora."

The organization has been focused on four key areas of impact:

1. The future of work
2. Wealth
3. Health
4. Democracy

== Essence Festival ==
Every year, the Global Black Economic Forum hosted a several-day convention at the Essence Festival of Culture. Programming is varied, though usually includes "an intensive series of conversations and activations designed to create policy solutions for Black people around the globe." In 2023, Kamala Harris, Janet Yellen, Linda Thomas-Greenfield, and many other members of the Biden-Harris administration participated, as well as Justin Bibb. In 2024, Native Land Pod, Francia Márquez, and Oley Dibba-Wadda led conversations on stage. In 2025, Ketanji Brown Jackson, Ron Kirk, Aletha Maybank, and many other speakers were in attendance.

Other programming includes Queer Space, a party and celebration for Black LGBTQ individuals, as well as a Business Summit.

Prior to the 2025 Essence Festival of Culture, the Global Black Economic Forum and SisterSong led a four-city tour across the United States to gather community members in anticipation of the festival.

== Collaborations ==
=== U.S. News & World Report ===
In 2024, the Global Black Economic Forum announced a partnership with U.S. News & World Report in order to create content, programming, and leadership building toward goals having to do with equity. The collaboration began with a panel discussion, led by David, at the State of Equity in America forum in Washington, D.C. that June.

=== Lawyers' Committee for Civil Rights Under Law ===
In 2024, the Global Black Economic Forum partnered with the Lawyers' Committee for Civil Rights Under Law on Ojo Asé: Black Women Answering the Call, in order to acknowledge and honor Black women involved in votings rights campaigns across the United States, as well as train and mobilize community members to protect election infrastructure ahead of the 2024 United States elections.

=== Ellen Johnson Sirleaf Foundation ===
In 2023, the Global Black Economic Forum and Essence Ventures donated $300,000 to the Ellen Johnson Sirleaf Foundation, an organization dedicated to nurturing leadership in women across Africa.

=== National Minority Supplier Development Council ===
In 2023, the Global Black Economic Forum announced a partnership with the National Minority Supplier Development Council to promote, train, and connect businesses from underrepresented communities.

=== When We All Vote ===
In 2024, the Global Black Economic Forum collaborated with the Essence Festival of Culture and Michelle Obama's When We All Vote initiative in order to recruit 10,000 volunteers, or "Essence Voting Squad members," as well as register thousands of people to vote and education millions on voting rights, ballots, and pressing issues.
