= American Foundation for Equal Rights =

American nonprofit organization

- AFER logo
- Founded: 2009
- Dissolved: 2015
- Type: Non-governmental organization 501(c)(3)
- Purpose: Hollingsworth v. Perry, Proposition 8
- Location: Los Angeles, California
- Region served: United States

The American Foundation for Equal Rights (AFER) was a nonprofit organization active in the United States from 2009 through 2015. The organization was established to support the plaintiffs in Hollingsworth v. Perry (formerly Perry v. Brown or Perry v. Schwarzenegger), a federal lawsuit challenging California's Proposition 8 under the Due Process and Equal Protection Clauses of the Fourteenth Amendment to the United States Constitution. AFER retained former United States Solicitor General Theodore B. Olson and David Boies (who worked on opposite sides in Bush v. Gore) to lead the legal team representing the plaintiffs challenging Proposition 8.

== History ==
AFER was launched in spring 2009 as the sole sponsor of Perry v. Schwarzenegger, the federal constitutional challenge to California's Proposition 8. The organization was co-founded by political consultants Chad Griffin and Kristina Schake. The organization shut down in 2015.

== Leadership ==
AFER was governed by a seven-member board of directors. The board president was Bruce Cohen, and the treasurer was Michele Singer Reiner. Other board members included Dustin Lance Black, Chad Griffin, Jonathan D. Lewis, Ken Mehlman, and Rob Reiner.

AFER's advisory board was co-chaired by Robert A. Levy, chairman of the Cato Institute, and John Podesta, chair and counselor of the Center for American Progress. Advisory board members include Julian Bond, Dan Choi, Margaret Hoover, Dolores Huerta, Cleve Jones, David Mixner, Stuart Milk, Hilary Rosen, and Judy Shepard.

== Activities ==
In January 2010, Theodore B. Olson published a cover essay in Newsweek magazine entitled "The Conservative Case for Gay Marriage," in which Olson argued:

Legalizing same-sex marriage would also be a recognition of basic American principles, and would represent the culmination of our nation's commitment to equal rights. It is, some have said, the last major civil-rights milestone yet to be surpassed in our two-century struggle to attain the goals we set for this nation at its formation. This bedrock American principle of equality is central to the political and legal convictions of Republicans, Democrats, liberals, and conservatives alike.

Adam Nagourney and Brooks Barnes of The New York Times described approaches like AFER's as a:

dramatic evolution of a behind-the-scenes fund-raising network whose goal is to legalize same-sex marriage from coast to coast. This emerging group of donors is not quite like any other fund-raising network that has supported gay-related issues over the past 40 years. They come from Hollywood, yes, but also from Wall Street and Washington and the corporate world; there are Republicans as well as Democrats; and perhaps most strikingly, longtime gay organizers said, there has been an influx of contributions from straight donors unlike anything they have seen before.

Freedom to Marry founder Evan Wolfson "credits conservatives like Ted Olson and former Republican National Committee chairman Ken Mehlman with accelerating th[e] trend" of increasing Republican support for marriage equality.

AFER held a September 2010 event at the Mandarin Oriental Hotel in New York City co-hosted by prominent Republicans Ken Mehlman, Paul Singer, and Peter Thiel.

== Hollingsworth v. Perry ==
The plaintiffs' lead attorneys in the Perry litigation, Theodore B. Olson and David Boies, were from opposite sides of the political spectrum. Olson is a longtime Republican who served as Solicitor General under President George W. Bush and as an Assistant Attorney General in charge of the Office of Legal Council in the United States Department of Justice under President Ronald Reagan. Boies is a prominent Democratic trial lawyer. The two men represented George W. Bush and Al Gore, respectively, during the 2000 Florida presidential election recount. AFER co-founder Chad Griffin described the Perry case as an effort that "could make same-sex marriage be seen as a nonpartisan issue—forget bipartisan." The complaint in Perry v. Schwarzenegger was filed on May 22, 2009 in United States District Court for the Northern District of California. The case was assigned to Chief Judge Vaughn R. Walker.

California Governor Arnold Schwarzenegger and Attorney General Jerry Brown declined to defend Proposition 8, with Attorney General Brown conceding that Proposition 8 is unconstitutional. In July 2009, the official proponents of Proposition 8—Dennis Hollingsworth, Gail J. Knight, Martin F. Guitierrez, Hak-Shing William Tam, and ProtectMarriage.com—were permitted to intervene to defend Proposition 8. The City and County of San Francisco was granted leave to intervene in support of Plaintiffs.

In January 2010, a 12-day trial was held before Chief Judge Walker. The trial proceedings were recorded on video. That video recording remains under seal as part of the case record. At trial, Plaintiffs presented 17 witnessed: eight lay witnesses, including the four plaintiffs, and nine expert witnesses. Proponents presented only two witnesses. Closing arguments were heard on June 16, 2010.

On August 4, 2010, the District Court found in favor of plaintiffs and declared Proposition 8 unconstitutional. The District Court concluded that Proposition 8 violated the Due Process Clause because it "unconstitutionally burdens the exercise of the fundamental right to marry" and "cannot withstand rational basis review" or the strict scrutiny required for a law that infringes on a fundamental rights. The District Court also concluded that Proposition 8 violates the Equal Protection Clause because it "creates an irrational classification on the basis of sexual orientation." The court supported its conclusions of law with 80 detailed factual findings. The District Court concluded:

Because California has no interest in discriminating against gay men and lesbians, and because Proposition 8 prevents California from fulfilling its constitutional obligation to provide marriages on an equal basis, the court concludes that Proposition 8 is unconstitutional.

On August 12, 2010, Chief Judge Walker denied Proponents' motion for a stay and entered a permanent injunction against the enforcement of Proposition 8.

On August 4, 2010, Proponents noticed an appeal to the United States Court of Appeals for the Ninth Circuit. On August 16, 2010, the Ninth Circuit granted Proponents' motion for a stay pending appeal and set an expedited briefing schedule.

The appeal was heard before a three-judge panel: Circuit Judges Stephen Reinhardt, Michael Daly Hawkins, and N. Randy Smith. The panel heard oral argument on December 6, 2010, and was broadcast on television and the Internet, becoming the most watched appellate court proceeding in American history.

On January 4, 2011, the panel issued an order certifying the following question to the Supreme Court of California:

Whether under Article II, Section 8 of the California Constitution, or otherwise under California law, the official proponents of an initiative measure possess either a particularized interest in the initiative's validity or the authority to assert the State's interest in the initiative's validity, which would enable them to defend the constitutionality of the initiative upon its adoption or appeal a judgment invalidating the initiative, when the public officials charged with that duty refuse to do so.

The Ninth Circuit certified the question because it "require[d] such an authoritative determination" of California law to "determine whether Proponents have standing to maintain this appeal."

The California Supreme Court agreed to decide the Ninth Circuit's certified question in February 2011, heard oral argument in September 2011, and issued its decision in November 2011. The California Supreme Court's unanimous decision was authored by Chief Justice Tani Cantil-Sakauye. In answering the Ninth Circuit's certified question, the California Supreme Court held:

that when the public officials who ordinarily defend a challenged state law or appeal a judgment invalidating the law decline to do so, under article II, section 8 of the California Constitution and the relevant provisions of the Elections Code, the official proponents of a voter-approved initiative measure are authorized to assert the state's interest in the initiative's validity, enabling the proponents to defend the constitutionality of the initiative and to appeal a judgment invalidating the initiative.

In April 2011, while the California Supreme Court was considering the Ninth Circuit's certified question, the proponents of Proposition 8 filed motions to return the video recordings of the trial and to vacate the District Court's judgment invalidating Proposition 8. Plaintiffs opposed both motions and cross-moved to unseal the video recordings. On June 14, 2011, Chief Judge James Ware of the United States District Court for the Northern District of California denied both of Proponents' motions. On September 19, 2011, Chief Judge Ware granted Plaintiffs' cross-motion and ordered the digital video recording of the trial unsealed. Proponents' appealed both decisions. On December 8, 2011, the Ninth Circuit heard another round of oral argument to consider Proponents' appeals regarding the trial recordings and motion to vacate judgment.

On February 2, 2012, the three-judge panel unanimously reversed the District Court's decision to unseal the trial tapes.

On February 7, 2012, the panel affirmed the District Court's judgment that found Proposition 8 unconstitutional. The panel's majority opinion was authored by Judge Stephen Reinhardt, and unanimously concluded that Proponents possess standing to maintain their appeal and that the District Court properly rejected Proponents' motion to vacate the judgment entered by former Chief Judge Walker. Judge Reinhardt, joined by Judge Hawkins, concluded that Proposition 8 violates the Equal Protection Clause. Judge Reinhardt wrote:

Proposition 8 serves no purpose, and has no effect, other than to lessen the status and human dignity of gays and lesbians in California. The Constitution simply does not allow for "laws of this sort."

Judge N. Randy Smith filed a separate opinion concurring in part and dissenting in part. While Judge Smith agreed with the majority that Proponents have standing and that their motion to vacate judgment should be denied, he dissented from the majority's conclusion that Proposition 8 violates the Equal Protection Clause.

On February 21, 2012, Proponents petitioned the Ninth Circuit for rehearing en banc, which Plaintiffs opposed. The Ninth Circuit denied Proponents' petition on June 5, 2012. Judge Diarmuid O'Scannlain filed a short opinion dissenting from the denial of rehearing en banc, which was joined by Judges Jay Bybee and Carlos Bea. Judges Reinhardt and Hawkins filed a joint statement concurring in the denial of rehearing en banc.

On July 30, 2012, Proponents filed a petition for a writ of certiorari in the United States Supreme Court. On December 7, 2012, the Court granted Proponents' petition in the case, now named Hollingsworth v. Perry. The Court heard oral argument in Perry on Tuesday, March 26, 2013.

On June 26, 2013, the U.S. Supreme Court ruled that the sponsors of Proposition 8 lacked legal standing to appeal the district court decision when the state of California refused to do so. The Ninth Circuit's judgment in Perry was vacated, and the case was remanded with instructions to dismiss the appeal. In a 5–4 opinion authored by Chief Justice John G. Roberts. Jr., which Justices Antonin Scalia, Ruth Bader Ginsburg, Stephen G. Breyer, and Elena Kagan joined, the Court concluded:

For there to be ... a case or controversy [under Article III of the Constitution], it is not enough that the party invoking the power of the court have a keen interest in the issue. That party must also have "standing," which requires, among other things, that it have suffered a concrete and particularized injury. Because we find that petitioners do not have standing, we have no authority to decide this case on the merits, and neither did the Ninth Circuit.

Justice Anthony M. Kennedy filed a dissenting opinion, which was joined by Justices Clarence Thomas, Samuel Alito, and Sonia Sotomayor. The dissent would have found that the Proponents of Proposition 8 possessed legal standing.

== Schaefer v. Bostic ==
The initial complaint, Bostic v. McDonnell, was filed July 18, 2013, in the United States District Court for the Eastern District of Virginia. The case was assigned to District Judge Arenda Wright Allen.

Robert F. McDonnell, in his official capacity as Governor of Virginia, and Ken Cuccinelli, in his official capacity as Attorney General, were listed as defendants along with George E. Schaefer, III, in his official capacity as Clerk of Court for Norfolk Circuit Court. Tim Bostic and Tony London of Norfolk, Virginia, an unmarried couple, filed the initial complaint.

The court dismissed Governor McDonnell and Attorney General Cuccinelli and an amended complaint was filed on September 3, 2013, that added Janet M. Rainey, in her official capacity as State Registrar of Vital Records, as a defendant. The suit proceeded as Bostic v. Rainey.

The American Foundation for Equal Rights joined the lawsuit in September 2013 along with two additional plaintiffs, Carol Schall and Mary Townley of Richmond, who were married in California in 2008, were raising a teenage daughter in Virginia, and sought to have their marriage officially recognized by law.

In January 2014, Michele McQuigg, in her official capacity as Prince William County Clerk of Court, successfully intervened in the case as a defendant.

A hearing was held at the district court on February 4, 2014. Ted Olson as well as Solicitor General Stuart Raphael, on behalf of the state, made arguments in favor of the plaintiffs. New-elected Attorney General Mark Herring announced his support for marriage equality ahead of oral arguments. Newly elected Governor Terry McAuliffe announced his support soon after the district court decision.

On February 13, 2014, Judge Wright Allen ruled that Virginia's statutory ban on same-sex marriage is unconstitutional. The court held that the right to marry is a fundamental right, and therefore the limitation to such right is subject to strict scrutiny. Judge Wright Allen found the state's laws did not even pass rational basis review, the least demanding standard of review. The decision was stayed pending appeal by the state.

Clerk of Court for Norfolk Circuit Court George E. Schaefer, III, appealed the district court decision on February 24, 2014, to the United States Court of Appeals for the Fourth Circuit. Defendant McQuigg filed a separate appeal. Seeking a swift conclusion to the case in favor of the plaintiffs, defendant Janet M. Rainey also appealed the decision on behalf of the state of Virginia.

On March 10, 2014, the Fourth Circuit Court of Appeals allowed a class of individuals in another case, Harris v. McDonnell, to intervene in Bostic.

Arguments were held on May 13 before Circuit Judges Roger Gregory, Paul V. Niemeyer, and Henry F. Floyd.

On July 28, 2014, the Fourth Circuit affirmed the district court's decision in a 2-1 ruling. Judge Henry Floyd wrote the majority opinion in which Judge Gregory joined. Judge Niemeyer wrote a separate dissenting opinion. The mandate of the court's judgment was scheduled to issue on August 21, 2014.

Michele McQuigg asked the Fourth Circuit to stay its mandate in the case. On August 13, 2014, Judge Floyd, with the concurrence of Judge Gregory, denied the intervening defendant's motion. Judge Niemeyer voted to grant the motion. Judge Henry Floyd wrote the majority opinion in which Judge Gregory joined. McQuigg petitioned the U.S. Supreme Court to stay the Fourth Circuit's order pending the outcome of petitions to the high court for writ of certiorari.

U.S. Supreme Court Chief Justice John Roberts, circuit justice for the Fourth Circuit, referred the matter to the full court, which stayed enforcement of the ruling on August 20, 2014.

Seeking swift guidance on the constitutional question of marriage equality, Janet M. Rainey petitioned the U.S. Supreme Court for writ of certiorari, or petition for review, on behalf of the state of Virginia on August 8, 2014. Defendants Schaefer and McQuigg filed their own separate petitions with the high court.

Amicus briefs, of friends of the court briefs, were filed in favor of the plaintiffs by companies such as Nike, Inc., Amazon.com, and Oracle Corporation. Attorneys General of fifteen states where marriage equality was legal also urged the court via an amicus brief to review the important constitutional question of marriage equality and rule in favor of the Bostic plaintiffs.

All three petitions in the Bostic case were reviewed by the Supreme Court at the court's Long Conference on September 29, 2014.

On October 6, 2014, the court denied all three petitions for writ of certiorari officially and immediately making marriage equality law of the land in Virginia.

Petitions for writ of certiorari in marriage equality cases from Oklahoma, Utah, Wisconsin, and Indiana were also denied on October 6.

== 8 the Play ==
Main article: 8 (play)

AFER, along with Broadway Impact, an organization of theater artists and fans, sponsors 8, a play reenacting the trial of Perry v. Schwarzenegger. 8 was written by Dustin Lance Black in light of efforts by the proponents of Proposition 8 to prevent public broadcast of the trial and the release of video recordings from the trial.

8 had its world premiere reading on September 19, 2011 at the Eugene O'Neill Theatre in New York City, starring Morgan Freeman and John Lithgow. 8 had its West Coast premiere reading on March 3, 2012, at the Wilshire Ebell Theatre starring Brad Pitt, George Clooney, Martin Sheen, and Kevin Bacon. The Los Angeles performance was broadcast live on YouTube, a first for a non-profit.

AFER and Broadway Impact also license 8 for free to college and community theaters worldwide.

== See also ==
- 8 (play)
- LGBT rights in the United States
