= Steve Endean =

American LGBTQ rights activist

- Born: Steven Robert Endean; August 6, 1948
- Died: August 4, 1993 (aged 44)
- Education: University of Minnesota
- Occupation: Gay rights activist

Stephen Robert "Steve" Endean (August 6, 1948 – August 4, 1993) was an American gay rights activist, first in Minnesota, then nationally. Endean was the first lobbyist for LGBTQ rights at the Minnesota State Capitol. He was the director of the Gay Rights National Lobby in 1978, and he started the Human Rights Campaign Fund in 1980, serving as its first executive director. He also created the Fairness Fund, a LGBTQ rights organization, whose primary focus was on grassroots political lobbying.

== Early life ==
He was born in Davenport, Iowa, to parents Robert and Marilyn Endean, and from 1954 to 1959, lived in Illinois. He graduated from Lincoln High School in Bloomington, Minnesota in 1966. In 1967, he attended College of St. Thomas in St. Paul, Minnesota for one year. He then attended the University of Minnesota from 1968 to 1972, majoring in political science. He lived in Bloomington, before moving to Washington DC in 1978. He came out to his parents when he was 22 years old, by giving them a letter telling them he was gay.

== Career ==
His first foray into politics was in 1970, when he was an aide to the Wendell Anderson for governor campaign, and then a year later he was the scheduling coordinator for the Harry Davis mayor campaign. In 1971, Endean founded the Minnesota Committee for Gay Rights (later Gay Rights Legislative Committee), and became the first gay and lesbian rights lobbyist in Minnesota a year later. Endean recalled that in those early days of the 1970s, he was jeered at by some Minnesota lawmakers, when he was lobbying legislators for support of a LGBTQ rights bill.

In 1973, Endean started lobbying the Minneapolis City Council to include protection for gay rights in the Minneapolis anti-discrimination ordinance. At the time, he was working out of the office of then 6th Ward Alderman, Earl Netwal. Endean's persistent efforts eventually lead to a 10–0 vote to ban discrimination on the basis of "affectional or sexual preference".

Along with the Minnesota Committee for Gay Rights and Democratic legislators, Endean opposed trans-inclusion and public accommodations in a statewide gay rights bill, giving as their reason the belief that the bill would not pass with such inclusion. In the 1970s, he served as co-chairman of the Board of Directors of the National Gay Task Force (later NGLTF). In 1978, he became the director of the Gay Rights National Lobby. In 1980, he started the Human Rights Campaign Fund (HRC), and served as its first executive director.

In December 1986, Endean created the Fairness Fund, a LGBTQ rights organization whose objective was focused on grassroots political lobbying. In 1988, the Fairness Fund merged with the HRC. In 1991, he created the National Endorsement Campaign, an effort to get straight political leaders and media figures to endorse LGBT rights. Also in 1991, he published his memoir, Into the Mainstream. In 1993, he was present at the Minnesota State Capitol when the Legislature passed the Minnesota Human Rights Act, which banned LGBTQ discrimination in housing, employment, and education. The law included those same protections for the transgender community, the first such state inclusion in the country.

== Personal life ==
In 1985, Endean was diagnosed with AIDS. Due to his declining health, he retired on disability in 1991. He died of AIDS-related complications on August 4, 1993. He was a member of the Metropolitan Community Church.

== See also ==
- Table of years in LGBT rights
- Timeline of LGBT history
