= Joe Solmonese =

American political strategist and activist

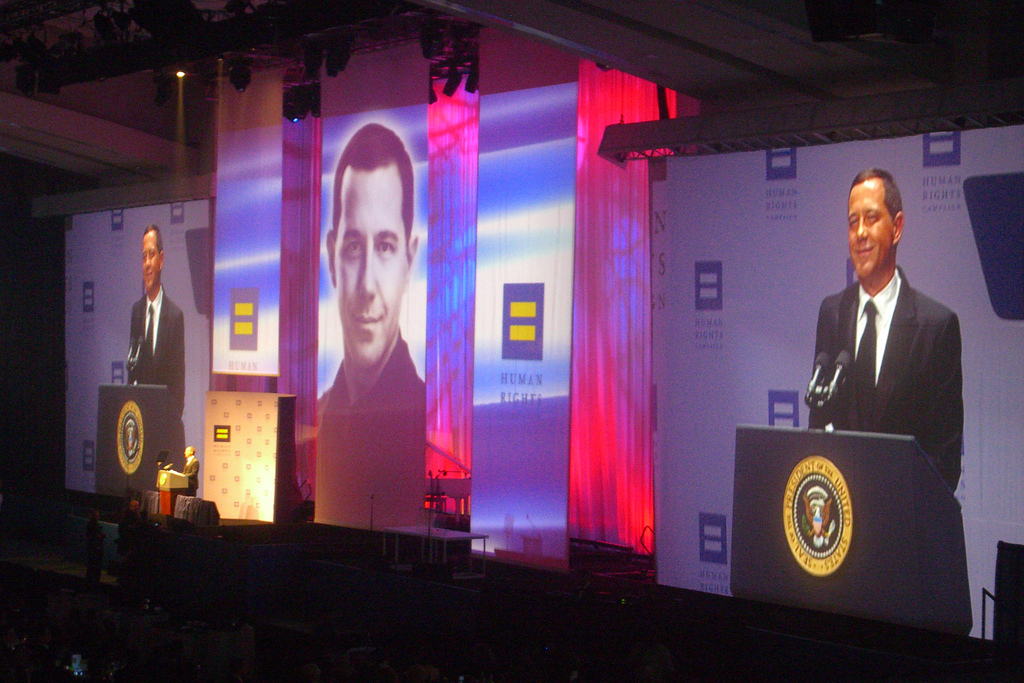

Personal details
- Party: Democratic
- Education: Boston University (BS)

Joe Solmonese is a political strategist and activist who served as president of the Human Rights Campaign of the United States and its affiliate the Human Rights Campaign Foundation. He was appointed to this position on March 9, 2005, replacing Cheryl Jacques. A native of Attleboro, Massachusetts, Solmonese lives in Washington, D.C. He graduated from Boston University in 1987 with a Bachelor of Science degree in communications.

Solmonese is the former chief executive officer of EMILY's List, where he oversaw one of the nation's prominent pro-choice Democratic political action committees, including its Political Opportunity Program.

Solmonese has worked for numerous campaigns and in government positions. He held top fundraising positions at the 1992 Senate campaign of Les AuCoin and Barney Frank's 1990 Congressional campaign. Solmonese began his career as an aide in the office of Massachusetts governor Michael Dukakis.

Solmonese hosted The Agenda with Joe Solmonese on XM Satellite Radio.

In February 2008, Solmonese appeared on two episodes of The Colbert Report.

On August 27, 2011, the Human Rights Campaign announced that Solmonese would step down as president of HRC on March 31, 2012. On February 22, 2012, the Obama 2012 campaign announced the appointment of Solmonese as one of 35 national co-chairs of the campaign. Chad Griffin succeeded Solmonese as president of HRC on June 11, 2012.

On April 17, 2012, Solmonese helped establish the corporate consulting firm Gavin/Solmonese as a managing director and founding partner, leading the firm's Washington, D.C., office. Joe leads the firm's Corporate Strategy, Public Affairs and Policy practice, where he advises corporations on organizational effectiveness strategies and policy development and implementation.

Solmonese was the CEO of the 2020 Democratic National Convention.

Non-profit organization positions
Preceded by Cheryl Jacques	President of the Human Rights Campaign; 2005–2012	Succeeded by Chad Griffin
