= Cheryl Jacques =

American politician

Cheryl Ann Jacques
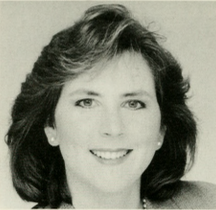

Member of the Massachusetts Senate from the Norfolk, Bristol & Middlesex district
- In office 1993–2004
- Preceded by: David H. Locke
- Succeeded by: Scott Brown

Personal details
- Born: February 17, 1962 (age 64)
- Party: Democratic
- Spouse: Jennifer Chrisler
- Children: 3
- Education: Boston College, Suffolk University Law School

Cheryl Ann Jacques (born February 17, 1962) is an American politician and attorney who served six terms in the Massachusetts Senate, was the president of the Human Rights Campaign for 11 months, and served as an administrative judge in the Massachusetts Department of Industrial Accidents.

Jacques graduated from Boston College in 1984 and received her J.D. from Suffolk University Law School in 1987.

Jacques was Assistant District Attorney in Middlesex County and Assistant Attorney General of the state. She ran for U.S. Congress, but lost in the Democratic primary to Stephen Lynch. Jacques was the first openly lesbian member of the Massachusetts Senate where she served six terms, and came out as a lesbian during her fourth, citing the statistic that one-third of gay and lesbian teens attempt suicide as part of her motivation for coming out. She was succeeded in the state Senate by Scott Brown.

Jacques became president of HRC in 2004, succeeding Elizabeth Birch. She addressed the 2004 Democratic National Convention in this post. She resigned on November 30, 2004, citing "a difference in management philosophy" with her board, following criticism of the HRC's failure to defeat voter referendums in 11 states banning same-sex marriage and, in some cases, civil unions.

After leaving HRC, she was of counsel to the law firm of Brody, Hardoon, Perkins and Kesten and was a consultant on diversity issues to corporations and non-profit organizations.

In 2008 Jacques was named a Department of Industrial Accidents Administrative Judge by Governor Deval Patrick. On March 12, 2012, the State Ethics Commission charged her with violating Massachusetts' conflict-of-interest law after she allegedly tried to use her clout as a judge to have a dentist office reduce her brother-in-law's bill. Jacques contended that she never intended to introduce her position, but did so "inadvertently". The ethics commission found in favor of Jacques on the grounds that the enforcement division failed to prove that Jacques used her official position to intervene in the dispute. In 2013, Jacques and two other administrative judges filed charges with the Massachusetts Commission Against Discrimination, alleging the agency provided a higher salary and a parking space to a male judge appointed after them. In 2014, Governor Patrick chose not to reappoint Jacques, which she alleged was in retaliation for the gender discrimination lawsuit.

== Personal life ==
In 2004, Jacques married Jennifer Chrisler. They have three sons.

Human Rights Campaign
Preceded by Elizabeth Birch	President; January 2004 – April 10, 2005	Succeeded by Joe Solmonese
