= Human Rights Campaign =

American LGBTQ civil rights advocacy group

- Abbreviation: HRC
- Formation: 1980; 46 years ago
- Founder: Steve Endean
- Type: Nonprofit advocacy organization
- Purpose: LGBTQ rights
- Headquarters: Washington, D.C., United States
- President: Kelley Robinson
- Affiliations: Human Rights Campaign Foundation, Human Rights Campaign PAC
- Revenue: $45.9 million (2024)
- Expenses: $51.9 million (2024)
- Website: hrc.org

The Human Rights Campaign (HRC) is an American LGBTQ advocacy group. It is the largest LGBTQ political lobbying organization within the United States. Based in Washington, D.C., the organization focuses on protecting and expanding rights for LGBTQ individuals, including advocating for same-sex marriage, anti-discrimination and hate crimes legislation, and HIV/AIDS advocacy. It also advocates for legal access to abortion. The organization has a number of legislative initiatives as well as programs for LGBTQ individuals.

== Structure ==
HRC is an umbrella group of two separate non-profit organizations and a political action committee: the HRC Foundation, a 501(c)(3) organization that focuses on research, advocacy and education; the Human Rights Campaign, a 501(c)(4) organization that focuses on promoting lesbian, gay, bisexual, transgender, and queer (LGBTQ) rights through lobbying Congress and state and local officials for support of pro-LGBTQ bills, and mobilizing grassroots action amongst its members; and the HRC Political Action Committee, a super PAC which supports and opposes political candidates.

=== Leadership ===
Kelley Robinson was announced as the new president of the Human Rights Campaign on September 20, 2022. She succeeded Interim President Joni Madison on November 28, 2022, becoming the first Black queer woman to lead the organization.

HRC's work is supported by three boards: the Board of Directors, which is the governing body for the organization; the HRC Foundation Board, which manages the foundation's finances and establishes official policies governing the foundation; and the board of governors, which manages the organization's local outreach nationwide.

== History ==
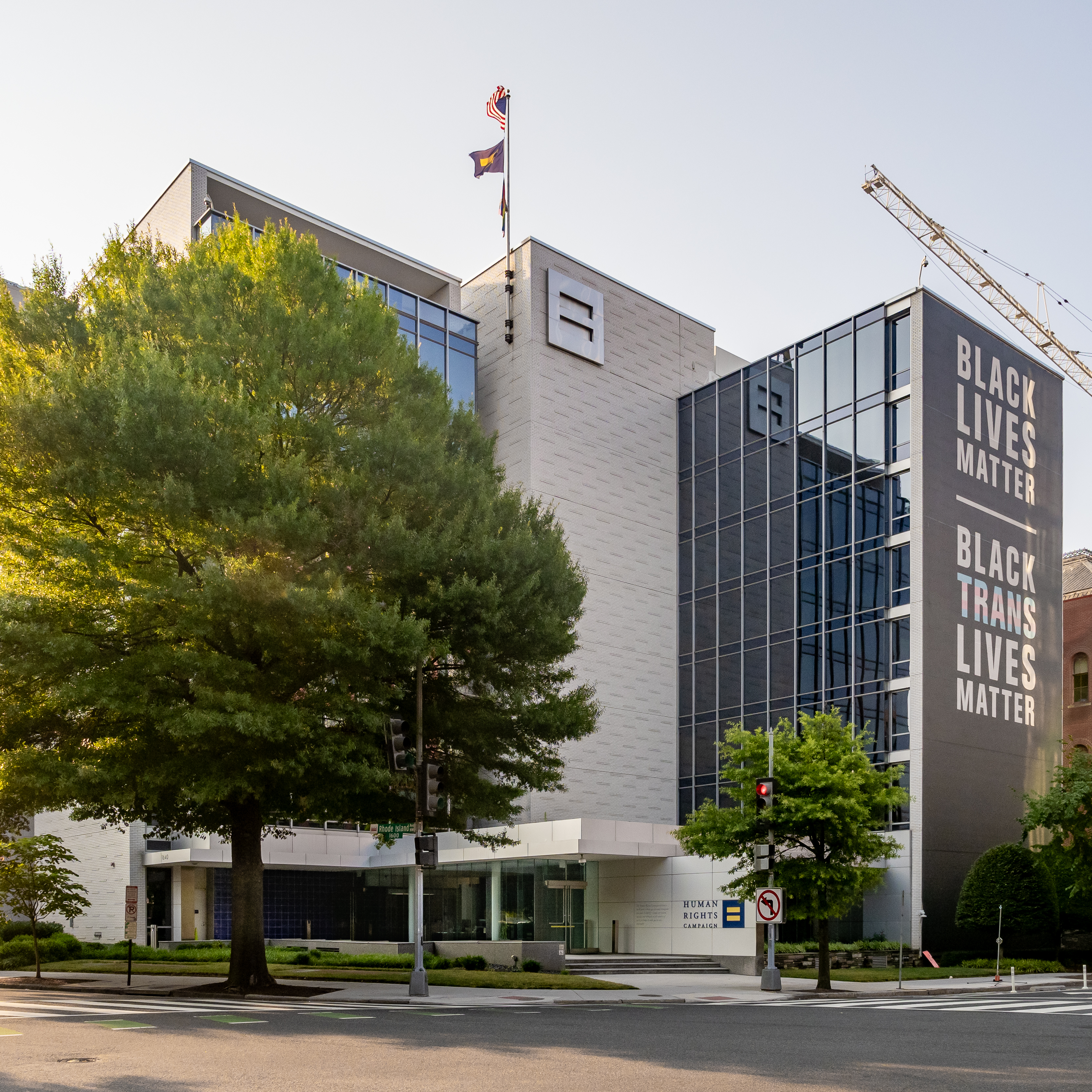
HRC headquarters

Steve Endean, who had worked with a previously established Gay Rights National Lobby from 1978, established the Human Rights Campaign Fund political action committee in 1980. The two groups eventually merged. In 1983, Vic Basile, at the time one of the leading LGBT rights activists in Washington, D.C., was elected as the first executive director. In October 1986, the HRC Foundation (HRCF) was formed as a non-profit organization.

In January 1989, Basile announced his departure, and HRC reorganized from serving mainly as a political action committee (PAC) to broadening its function to encompass lobbying, research, education, and media outreach. HRC decided on a new Statement of Purpose: "For the promotion of the social welfare of the gay and lesbian community by drafting, supporting and influencing legislation and policy at the federal, state and local level." Tim McFeeley, a Harvard Law School graduate, founder of the Boston Lesbian and Gay Political Alliance, and a co-chair of the New England HRC Committee, was elected the new executive director. Total membership was then approximately 25,000 members.

In 1992, HRC endorsed a presidential candidate for the first time, Bill Clinton. In March 1993, HRC began a new project, National Coming Out Day. Other tangible accomplishments from the 90's are harder to document. From January 1995 until January 2004, Elizabeth Birch served as the executive director of the HRC. Under her leadership, the institution more than quadrupled its membership to 500,000 members.

In 1995, the organization dropped the word "Fund" from its name, becoming the Human Rights Campaign. That same year, it underwent a complete reorganization. The HRC Foundation added new programs such as the Workplace Project and the Family Project, while HRC itself broadly expanded its research, communications, and marketing/public relations functions. The organization also unveiled a new logo, a yellow equal sign inside of a blue square.

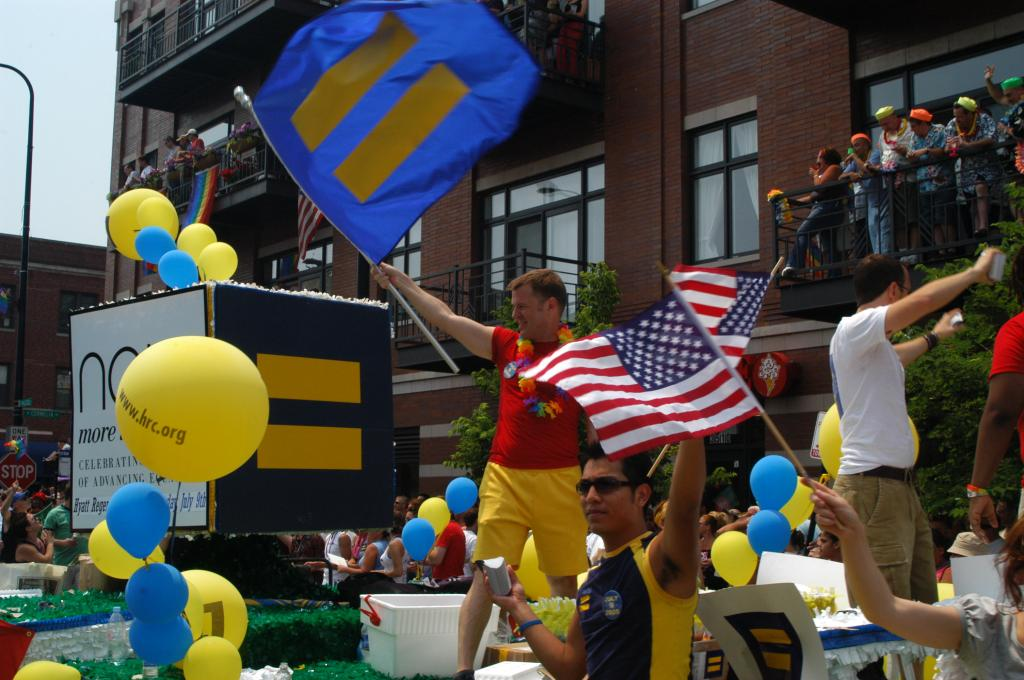
The Human Rights Campaign often has a large presence at LGBT-related events such as the Chicago Pride Parade as seen above.

As part of the activities surrounding the Millennium March on Washington, the HRC Foundation sponsored a fundraising concert at Washington, D.C.'s RFK Stadium on April 29, 2000. Billed as a concert to end hate crimes, "Equality Rocks" honored hate crime victims and their families, such as featured speakers Dennis and Judy Shepard, the parents of Matthew Shepard. The event included Melissa Etheridge, Garth Brooks, Pet Shop Boys, k.d. lang, Nathan Lane, Rufus Wainwright, Albita Rodríguez, and Chaka Khan.

Elizabeth Birch's successor, Cheryl Jacques, resigned in November 2004 after only 11 months as executive director. Jacques said she had resigned over "a difference in management philosophy".

In March 2005, HRC announced the appointment of Joe Solmonese as the president. He served in that position until stepping down in May 2012 to co-chair the Barack Obama presidential campaign.

HRC launched its Religion and Faith Program in 2005 to mobilize clergy to advocate for LGBT people, and helped form DC Clergy United for Marriage Equality, which was involved in the legalization of same-sex marriage in the District of Columbia. On March 10, 2010, the first legally recognized same-sex weddings in the District of Columbia were held at the headquarters of the Human Rights Campaign.

On August 9, 2007, HRC and Logo TV co-hosted a forum for 2008 Democratic presidential candidates dedicated specifically to LGBT issues.

In 2010, HRC lobbied for the repeal of the United States ban on HIV-positive people's entry into the country for travel or immigration.

In September 2011, it was announced that Joe Solmonese would step down as president of HRC following the end of his contract in 2012. Despite initial speculation that former Atlanta City Council president Cathy Woolard would be appointed, no replacement was announced until March 2, 2012, when American Foundation for Equal Rights co-founder Chad Griffin was announced as Solmonese's successor. Griffin took office on June 11, 2012.

In 2012, HRC said that it had raised and contributed $20 million to re-elect President Obama and to advance same-sex marriage. In addition to the Obama re-election campaign, HRC spent money on marriage-related ballot measures in Washington, Maine, Maryland and Minnesota, and the election of Democratic Senator Tammy Baldwin in Wisconsin.

In 2013, HRC conducted a postcard campaign in support of the Employment Non-Discrimination Act (ENDA).

In 2019, HRC joined with 42 other religious and allied organizations in issuing a statement opposing Project Blitz, an effort by a coalition of Christian right organizations to influence state legislation.

In May 2020, HRC endorsed former Vice President Joe Biden in the 2020 United States presidential election.

In June 2023, HRC declared a "national state of emergency" for LGBT people following a wave of anti-LGBT laws that were enacted in a number of U.S. states over the previous few years.

=== Executive directors, presidents, and CEOs ===
Beginning with the founder, the highest management position in the organization was Executive director. Beginning in 2004, the position was changed to President and CEO.

Years	Name
1980–1983	Steve Endean
1983–1989	Vic Basile
1989–1995	Tim McFeeley
1995–2004	Elizabeth Birch
2004–2004	Cheryl Jacques
2005–2012	Joe Solmonese
2012–2019	Chad Griffin
2019–2021	Alphonso David
2022–	Kelley Robinson

=== Funding ===
As of 2020, HRC's annual budget was $44.6 million, and annual expenses were $44.3 million.

Each year since 1997, HRC has hosted a national dinner that serves as the organization's single largest annual fundraiser. In 2009, President Barack Obama spoke at HRC's 13th Annual National Dinner. In his speech, President Obama reaffirmed his pledge to repeal "Don't Ask, Don't Tell" and the Defense of Marriage Act (DOMA), as well as his commitment to passing the Employment Non-Discrimination Act. He gave the keynote speech in 2011 as well, reiterating his pledge to fight for DOMA repeal and for the passage of ENDA, and to combat bullying of LGBT youth. Other featured speakers at past dinners have included Bill Clinton, Maya Angelou, Kweisi Mfume, Joseph Lieberman, Hillary Clinton, Richard Gephardt, John Lewis, Rosie O'Donnell, Nancy Pelosi, Tim Gunn, Suze Orman, Sally Field, Cory Booker, Tammy Baldwin, and Betty DeGeneres.

=== HRC historical records ===
The historical records of the Human Rights Campaign are maintained in a collection at the Cornell University Library. Arriving at Cornell in 2004, the records include strategic planning documents, faxes, minutes, e-mails, press releases, posters, and campaign buttons. Taking up 84 cubic feet (2.4 m^{3}), the archive is the second largest in the library's Division of Rare and Manuscript Collections, Human Sexuality Collection. In February 2007, the archive was opened to scholars at the library, and selected records were organized into an online exhibit called "25 Years of Political Influence: The Records of the Human Rights Campaign".

== Programs and positions ==
According to the organization, the Human Rights Campaign "is organized for the charitable and educational purposes of promoting public education and welfare for the lesbian, gay, bisexual and transgender community."

The HRC Foundation provides resources on coming out, transgender issues, LGBT-related healthcare topics, and information about workplace issues faced by LGBT people, including the Corporate Equality Index.

HRC lobbies for the passage of anti-discrimination and hate crime laws. The organization supported the passage of the Matthew Shepard and James Byrd Jr. Hate Crimes Prevention Act, which expanded federal hate-crime law to allow the Justice Department to investigate and prosecute crimes motivated by a victim's actual or perceived gender, sexual orientation, gender identity, or disability.

The organization's work on health issues traditionally focused on responding to the HIV/AIDS epidemic. In recent years, HRC has addressed discrimination in health care settings for LGBT employees, patients and their families. Since 2007, the Human Rights Campaign Foundation has published the "Healthcare Equality Index", which rates hospitals on issues such as patient and employee non-discrimination policies, employee cultural competency training, and hospital visitation rights for LGBT patients' families.

The Human Rights Campaign advocates for abortion access as a fundamental human right and a critical component of healthcare. HRC highlights that LGBTQ+ people face higher rates of unwanted pregnancies, discrimination in healthcare, and need for abortion services.

Lobbyists from the Human Rights Campaign worked with the Obama administration to extend hospital visitation rights to same-sex partners. HRC lobbied extensively for the repeal of the Don't Ask Don't Tell (DADT) law, which barred gay and lesbian people from serving openly in the United States military.

The HRC filed a lawsuit in both state and federal courts contesting the "transgender sports ban" law in Florida in 2021, in an attempt to block the law from going into effect (called "nullification") on midnight July 1.

== Logo ==
The official logo of the HRC, adopted in 1995, consists of a yellow equals sign imposed onto a blue background. The logo was created in 1995 by design firm Stone Yamashita. The previous logo used by the HRC (then known as the HRCF) featured a stylized flaming torch. HRC uses the term Equality Flag for flags bearing their logo.

The Equality Flag is based on the HRC logo. It [the flag] flies from the HRC’s headquarters.

=== Same-sex marriage logo ===
The HRC equal sign logo reworked in red and pink to show particular support for same-sex marriage

HRC shared a red version of its logo – selected by marketing director Anastasia Khoo because the color is synonymous with love – on social network services on March 25, 2013, and asked its supporters to do the same to show support for same-sex marriage in light of two cases that were before the U.S. Supreme Court (United States v. Windsor and Hollingsworth v. Perry). The logo went viral, and Facebook saw a 120% increase in the number of profile photo changes on March 26. Celebrities such as George Takei, Beyonce, Sophia Bush, Padma Lakshmi, Martha Stewart, Macklemore, Ryan Lewis and Ellen DeGeneres shared the logo with their millions of followers on social network services and politicians like Senator Claire McCaskill (D-MO), Jay Rockefeller (D-WV), and Kay Hagan (D-NC) did the same.

Brands and corporations showed their support for same-sex marriage with creative recreations of the red HRC logo. Supporters included Bud Light, Bonobos, Fab.com, Kenneth Cole, L'Occitane en Provence, Maybelline, Absolut, Marc Jacobs International, Smirnoff, Martha Stewart Weddings, and HBO's True Blood.

Major print and online news sources reported on the success of the viral campaign, including MSNBC, Time, Mashable, and The Wall Street Journal.

== Criticism and controversies ==
Critics have taken HRC to task for its working environment. In the fall of 2014, HRC commissioned outside consultants to conduct a series of focus groups and surveys with the organization's staff. In the report, which was obtained by BuzzFeed News, staff of the organization described the working environment at HRC as "judgmental", "exclusionary", "sexist", and "homogenous". The report stated that "Leadership culture is experienced as homogenous — gay, white, male." Acknowledging the report, HRC president Chad Griffin said: "Like many organizations and companies throughout our country, HRC has embarked on a thoughtful and comprehensive diversity and inclusion effort with the goals of better representing the communities we serve." In August 2015, Pride at Work, an LGBT affiliate of the AFL–CIO, approved a resolution that calls on member organizations to stop funding HRC until the group addresses what Pride at Work sees as problems with HRC's Corporate Equality Index.

HRC has been accused of overstating the number of its actual members in order to appear more influential in politics. Former HRC President Joe Solmonese responded, saying that "[m]embership is about more than contributions ... [i]t's about sending e-mails to elected officials, volunteering time or lobbying members of Congress" and more than half of its members made contributions during the previous two years. Earlier, HRC spokesperson Steven Fisher stated that its membership includes anyone who has donated at least $1.

HRC has also been criticized for exceedingly generous executive salaries.

=== Employment Non-Discrimination Act ===
Some transgender people have criticized the HRC for its stance on the 2007 version of ENDA, which at the time included sexual orientation as a protected category but not gender identity and expression. Once the legislation was submitted by Rep. Barney Frank, HRC officially neither opposed nor supported it. This followed a speech by former HRC President Joe Solmonese at the transgender Southern Comfort Conference the previous month, where he said that HRC "oppose[d] any legislation that is not absolutely inclusive". HRC later explained that it could not actively support a non-inclusive bill, but did not oppose it because the legislation would strategically advance long-term efforts to pass a trans-inclusive ENDA. However, in a letter to U.S. Representatives, HRC did express support for the bill, stating that while HRC is "greatly disappointed that the current version of ENDA is not fully-inclusive ... we appreciate the steadfast efforts of our ... allies ... even when they are forced ... to make progress that is measured by inches rather than yards."

=== 2025 mass layoffs ===
On the evening of February 3, 2025, HRC announced to staff that the organization would be laying off approximately 20% of all employees across all levels, departments, and programs. On February 10, 2025, affected staff were notified if they had been laid off. The final number of layoffs significantly exceeded the 20% figure provided to press, including complete cuts to HRC's programs focused on transgender people and youth, as well as the leader of the organization's internal DEI team. In an interview, a staff member said, "To avoid layoffs, we explored a range of cost-saving measures, from attrition to aggressively pushing revenue and evaluating program expenses, but ultimately, both strategic and budget reasons" led us to this restructuring. Departing staff members were incentivized to sign a non-disparagement agreement with an additional month's worth of severance pay, as well as an additional month of health coverage. The layoffs drew significant criticism from the LGBTQ+ community, with journalist James Factora noting the significance of the layoff's timing amidst the first 100 days of the second Trump administration.

=== Organizational stance on Israel and Palestine ===
HRC has been criticized for its failure to call for a ceasefire in the Gaza Strip, as well as allegations that senior leadership routinely silence internal criticism of HRC's position on the Israeli-Palestinian conflict. It has been alleged that official statements from the organization downplay the impact of the occupation on Palestinians, and focus on the impact of the crisis on Americans. On June 6, 2024, journalist and Them contributor Samantha Riedel published a lengthy report uplifting multiple accounts of the organization's dismissal and ostracization of anti-Zionist staff stretching back at least a decade.

On February 3, 2024, a protest organized by ACT UP New York took place outside Human Rights Campaign's 2024 Greater New York Dinner in Manhattan. The protestors publicly denounced HRC's acceptance of donations from Northrop Grumman, a weapons manufacturer that supplied weapons to the Israeli military during the Israeli invasion of the Gaza Strip. The protestors additionally demanded HRC leadership to publicly call for an end to Israel's bombardment of Gaza. HRC events continue to be met by protests from members of the LGBTQ+ community demanding that the organization end its relationships with weapons manufacturers and stand in solidarity with Palestine.

=== Endorsements ===
HRC has been criticized both for favoring the Democratic Party and for endorsements of Republican candidates. Andrew Sullivan, a gay political columnist and blogger, has called HRC "a patronage wing of the Democratic party." However, HRC has also received backlash and criticism for several nominations of Republican candidates when their Democratic opponents scored higher on HRC's own index.

==== Endorsements of Republicans ====
HRC was criticized for its endorsement of New York Republican Al D'Amato in his 1998 campaign for re-election to the U.S. Senate. HRC defended the endorsement because of D'Amato's support for the Employment Non-Discrimination Act (ENDA) and the repeal of "Don't Ask, Don't Tell". However, many liberal LGBT leaders objected to D'Amato's conservative stances, including his opposition to affirmative action and abortion, and thought that HRC should have taken those positions into account when deciding on the endorsement.

In 2014, long-time supporter of same-sex marriage Shenna Bellows was nominated for a U.S. Senate seat in Maine. HRC endorsed her opponent, incumbent Republican Senator Susan Collins, who had previously lacked a history of supporting same-sex marriage initiatives. However, Collins later clarified her views, saying she supported gay marriage.

On March 11, 2016, HRC voted to endorse Republican U.S. Senator Mark Kirk over his Democratic Party challenger Representative Tammy Duckworth in his re-election bid to the United States Senate. Though Kirk later announced his support for same-sex marriage, the endorsement was met with widespread surprise and criticism in news media and social media as HRC had given Kirk a score of 78 percent out of 100 percent on LGBT issues, while it had awarded Duckworth a score of 100 percent. David Nir at Daily Kos called the endorsement as "appalling as it is embarrassing" and "pathetic and stupid", while Slate observed that Democratic control of the Senate was effectively necessary for passing the Equality Act of 2015 and beneficial for many other LGBT equality issues, and thus it would be in line with the organization's stated goals for Duckworth to be elected rather than Kirk. Meanwhile, The New Republic stated that, in light of a recent internal report revealing HRC's "serious diversity problem", "Choosing the white male candidate in this race over the Asian-American female candidate—someone who happens to have a better voting record anyway—is probably the worst way of convincing your detractors that you are taking a core problem seriously." HRC president Chad Griffin defended the endorsement in a column published by the Independent Journal Review, describing the senator's work on behalf of LGBT equality issues, including co-sponsoring the Equality Act of 2015. Griffin stated: "The truth is we need more cross party cooperation on issues of equality, not less", adding "when members of Congress vote the right way and stand up for equality — regardless of party — we must stand with them. We simply cannot ask members of Congress to vote with us, and then turn around and try to kick them out of office."

On October 28, 2016, on the day following Mark Kirk's controversial debate comment on Tammy Duckworth's heritage, HRC explicitly stated their endorsement of Kirk "remains unchanged" while asking him to "rescind" his comment. Slate stated this proved HRC's "worst critics right" and that HRC "is simply irredeemable". On October 29, two days after the comment, HRC described Kirk's statement as "deeply offensive and racist," revoked its endorsement of Kirk, and instead endorsed Duckworth for the U.S. Senate.

==== Endorsements of Democrats ====
In the 2016 U.S. presidential election, Human Rights Campaign's 32-person Board of Directors voted to endorse Hillary Clinton for president. This resulted in considerable controversy, causing thousands of users on HRC's Facebook page to post comments critical of the decision. Many cited HRC's own "congressional scorecard" (which records a 100% rating for her rival for the Democratic nomination, Bernie Sanders, while Clinton herself only scores 89%) as inconsistent with their endorsement. Additional scrutiny was also placed upon the connections Clinton herself has to the organization when it was revealed that HRC's President, Chad Griffin, had previously been employed by Clinton's husband, former U.S. President Bill Clinton.

In the 2018 New York gubernatorial election, the Human Rights Campaign endorsed incumbent governor Andrew Cuomo. However, Cynthia Nixon, who is bisexual, announced that she was running on March 25, 2018. Despite this, HRC still supported Cuomo. In response, HRC received criticism for not supporting an LGBTQ+ candidate, and supporting her opponent instead. Jimmy Van Bramer, a gay New York City Council Member who endorsed Nixon, said, "The HRC endorsement hurts Cynthia Nixon's chances," and that "coming out against a viable progressive queer woman is the wrong thing to do."

The HRC committed to spend $15 million on Biden 2024 reelection efforts in May 2024. Robinson stated, "Any vote that is not for Joe Biden is a vote for Donald Trump. Full stop and period" about "double doubters" considering voting for Robert F. Kennedy Jr. or other third-party candidates.

=== Alphonso David and Governor Andrew Cuomo ===
A report released in August 2021 following an independent investigation led by New York Attorney General Letitia "Tish" James described then HRC president Alphonso David's efforts to cover up sexual harassment claims against Governor Andrew Cuomo (prior to joining HRC, David was chief counsel to Cuomo) and undermine the credibility of accusers. David allegedly released the full personnel file of accuser (and former Cuomo adviser) Lindsey Boylan to the governor's office. Her file was then leaked to the press. David also assisted in drafting an unpublished letter in support of Cuomo and questioning Boylan's motivations. On September 6, 2021, David was fired as president of HRC. In February 2022, David filed a lawsuit against the Human Rights Campaign, alleging discrimination. He argued that the organization underpaid him and eventually fired him because of his race, while also saying the organization has a "deserved reputation for unequal treatment of its non-white employees."

== Awards ==
The Human Rights Campaign gives out a number of awards.

=== Visibility Award winners ===
- Dan Levy (2020)
- Liv Hewson (2020)
- Amandla Stenberg (2019, New York)
- Cynthia Nixon (2018)
- Evan Rachel Wood (2017)
- John Barrowman (2016)
- Colton Haynes (2016)
- Kesha (2016, Nashville)
- Clea Duvall (2015)
- Greg Rikaart (2014, National)
- Jonathan Del Arco (2013, National)
- Lana Wachowski (2012, San Francisco)
- Lee Daniels (2010, National)
- Johnny Weir (2010, Seattle)

=== Ally for Equality Award winners ===
- Kathryn Hahn (2024)
- Christina Aguilera (2019)
- Nick Robinson (2018)
- Meryl Streep (2017)
- LeAnn Rimes (2017)
- Uzo Aduba (2017)
- Kathryn Hahn (2016)
- Sherri Saum (2016)
- Brittany Snow (2015) for Love is Louder
- Natasha Lyonne (2015)
- Teri Polo (2015)
- Sara Ramirez (2015, Arizona)
- Jennifer Lopez (2014, National),
- Whoopi Goldberg (2013, National)
- Sally Field (2012, National), Jennifer Beals (2012, Chicago)
- Michael Bloomberg (2011, National)
- P!nk (2010)

=== Equality Award ===
- Seth Meyers (2017, National)
- NAACP and its president, Ben Jealous (2012, National)
- Suze Orman (2008, National)

HRC Award for Workplace Equality Innovation

- Monsanto (2017)
- Boston Consulting Group and Goldman Sachs (2011, National)
- Kimpton Hotels & Restaurants and Credit Suisse (2010)
- Kirkland & Ellis LLP and Boeing (2009, National)

== See also ==
- "All God's Children" Campaign
- Gay community
- List of LGBT rights organizations
