= LGBTQ history in Iran =

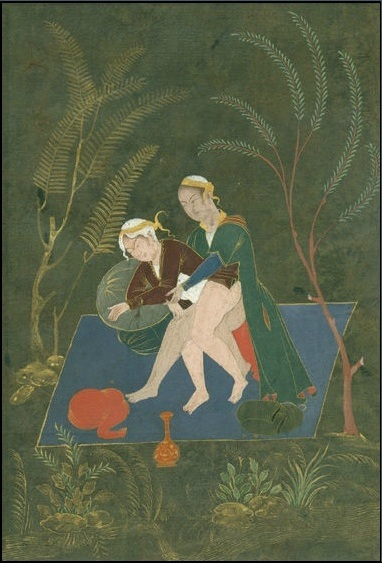
Anal sex between two males. (painting from Iran)

The history of LGBTQ people in Iran spans thousands of years. In pre-Islamic Iran, a tradition of homosexuality existed, however in Zoroastrianism it was condemned

The book Foucault and the Iranian Revolution: Gender and the Seductions of Islam by Janet Afary and Kevin Anderson, features a notable chapter on same-sex relations in Iran. In this chapter, Afary argues that the current regime in the Islamic Republic of Iran is suppressing a long-standing tradition of homosexual culture that dates back over a thousand years. She points out that classical Persian literature, including the works of poets like Attar, Rumi, Saadi, Hafez, Jami, and even Iraj Mirza in the 20th century, is filled with references to homoeroticism and openly discusses beautiful young boys and the practice of pederasty (not to be confused with homosexuality between adult men). Many of the famous love stories celebrated by these poets were between kings and their male servants or slaves. Sometimes, the beloved was the possession of a more powerful individual. Outside of royal courts, homosexuality and homoerotic expressions were accepted in various public settings, including monasteries, seminaries, taverns, military camps, bathhouses, and coffee houses. During the early Safavid era, male houses of prostitution were legally recognized and even paid taxes.

Since the Iranian revolution in 1979, the punishment for homosexuality has been based on Sharia law, with the maximum penalty being death. Transgender people had never been officially addressed by the government leading up to the 1979 revolution, but, after the Islamic Revolution sex reassignment surgery has been allowed through Islamic Law. The government provides up to half the cost of the procedure for those needing financial assistance, upon the provision of necessary documents and supporting proof of an identity disorder.

== Pre-Islamic period ==
Ancient Iranian society had a tradition of polytheism and pederasty, which came into sharp conflict during the Achaemenid era. Iranian pederasty and its origins were debated even in ancient times – for example, Herodotus claimed they had learned it from the Greeks: "From the Greeks they have learned to lie with boys." However, Plutarch asserts that the Iranians used eunuch boys to that end long before contact between the cultures. In either case, Plato claimed they saw fit to forbid it to the inhabitants of the lands they occupied, since "It does not suit the rulers that their subjects should think noble thoughts, nor that they should form the strong friendships and attachments which these activities, and in particular love, tend to produce."

Sextus Empiricus writing in his "Outlines of Scepticism" (circa C.E 200) asserted that the laws of the Persians were tolerant of homosexual behavior, and the men "indulge in intercourse with males" (1:152)

Around 250 BCE, during the Parthian Empire, the Zoroastrian text, the Vendidad, was written. It contains provisions that are part of sexual code promoting procreative sexuality that is interpreted to prohibit same-sex intercourse as a form of demon worship, and thus sinful. Ancient commentary on this passage suggests that those engaging in sodomy could be killed without permission from the Dastur. However, a strong homosexual tradition in Iran is attested to by Greek historians from the 5th century onward, and so the prohibition apparently had little effect on Iranian attitudes or sexual behavior outside the ranks of devout Zoroastrians in rural eastern Iran.

== Islamic period ==
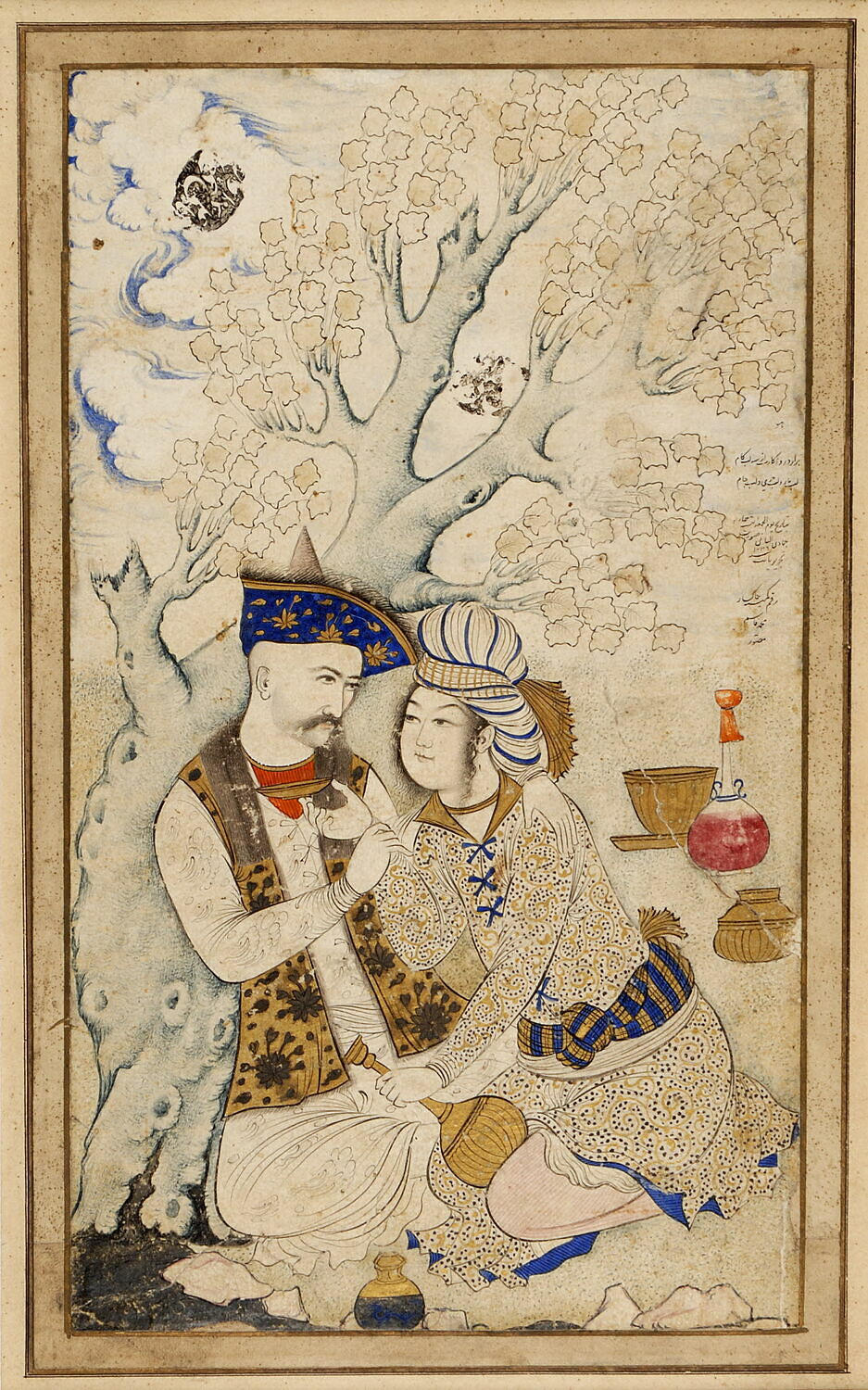
Shah Abbas with a page boy. By Muhammad Qasim, 1627, Safavid era.

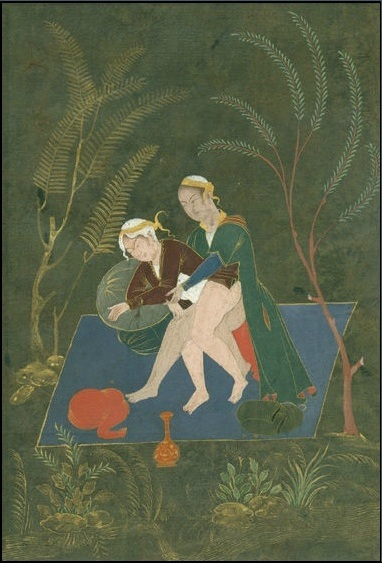
Two males engaging in anal sex. Watercolour on paper. Around 1660 – 1720, Safavid era.

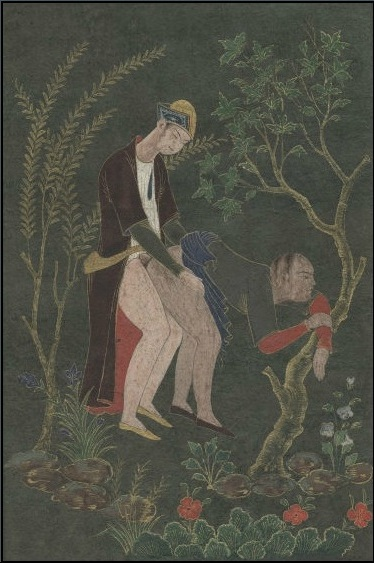
Two men engaging in anal sex. Watercolour on paper. Around 1660 – 1720, Safavid era.

There is a significant amount of Persian literature that explicitly illustrates the ancient existence of homosexuality among Iranians. In Persian poetry, references to sexual love can be found in addition to those of spiritual/religious love. More ghazals (love poems) and texts in Saadi's Bustan and Gulistan portray love between males than between male and female. In some poems, Sa'di's beloved is a young man, not a beautiful woman.

=== Safavid era ===
European travelers remarked on the taste that Shah Abbas of Iran (1588–1629) had for wine and festivities, but also for charming pages and cup bearers. A painting by Riza Abbasi with homo-erotic qualities shows the ruler enjoying such delights.

=== Pre-modern homosexuality ===
Throughout his study, historian Khaled El-Rouayheb has argued that same sex relations during the Islamic period contrasts from what is considered modern day homosexuality. His argument supports the notion of homosexuality as a concept that was only recently established as an identity.

The act of penetration between two men was previously regarded as an act of dominance rather than a sexual act - with one person presiding dominance over the other. The individual dominating the other person would be considered active and the other passive. Sexual acts involving individuals of the same sex were understood through the concept of passive and active participants rather than by gender. The man that was considered the passive participant was deplored due to it being seen as the more feminine role in comparison to the active participant who would be seen as more masculine and dominating.

A shift in the view of same-sex relation emerged during the nineteenth century. European influence created a separate narrative of what was considered homosexuality which resulted in Iran rejecting the idea of homosexuality altogether and embracing the concept of homosociality. Even still, this concept that men were participating in sexual practices with other men was still prevalent and seen as an act rather than a characteristic.

== 20th century Iran ==
=== Qajar era ===
In 1914, Magnus Hirschfeld wrote that "sodomy, tribadism" was punishable with capital punishment under the Sublime State of Iran under "Shiite religious laws", however in the case of women, this only applied with the fourth convictions, the other previous three convictions received 100 lashes. Although he also stated that "In recent years, the religious penal code has been implemented very negligently in practice. No one at the German embassy has heard about a conviction as a result of the crime in question."

=== Pahlavi Era ===
Under the rule of Mohammad Reza Pahlavi, the last monarch of the Pahlavi dynasty, homosexuality was tolerated, even to the point of allowing news coverage of a same-sex wedding. In the late 1970s, some Iranians even began to talk about starting up a gay rights organization, similar to the Gay Liberation movement. Until the revolution, there were some night clubs in which gay behavior was tolerated. During the Shah's time, however, homosexuality was still taboo everywhere, and often one could not turn to family or friends for support and guidance. There were no public agencies to assist youth or people who were confused or questioning their sexuality.

Due to the fact “Classical Persian literature—like the poems of Attar (died 1220), Rumi (d. 1273), Sa’di (d. 1291), Hafez (d. 1389), Jami (d. 1492), and even 20th century figures such as Iraj Mirza (d. 1926)—were replete with homoerotic allusions and pederasty. Ahmad Kasravi opposed homosexuality and initiated a movement against it, criticizing classical Persian poets like Khayyam, Rumi, Saadi, and Hafez, and advocating for the removal of these poets' works from textbooks. However, during the Pahlavi dynasty, Janet Afary mentions in an interview that literature professors have been compelled to claim that these incredibly beautiful love poems, which clearly express same-sex affection, are not actually about homosexuality. Instead, they are taught as metaphors for love between men and women, despite the explicit references to same-sex relationships.

Ernest Perron, a Swiss national and one of Mohammad Reza Pahlavi's closest friend for 20 years, was homosexual. Reza Shah, who desired to raise his crown prince in a masculine manner and was very watchful of his behavior, became angry at his return to Iran accompanied by a homosexual.

Among the architects and designers who assisted the Shahbanu in decorating the palace, Bijan Safari and Keyvan Khosravani were openly homosexual, yet they were constant companions of the royal family, indicating the level of sensitivity of the Shah and his wife, Farah Diba.

Janet Afary has argued that the 1979 revolution was partly motivated by moral outrage against the Shah's regime, and in particular against a mock same-sex wedding between two young men with ties to the court. She says that this explains the virulence of the anti-homosexual oppression in Iran.

Reza Pahlavi, Crown Prince and the son of Shah Mohammed Reza, argued that LGBT individuals had freedom before the “Mullah Regime” (the 1979 revolution).

== Islamic Republic of Iran ==
After the creation of the Islamic Republic of Iran, thousands of people were executed in public, including homosexuals. On 12 September 1979, Oriana Fallaci, Italian journalist, interviewed Ayatollah Ruhollah Khomeini. She asked him if it was right to shoot homosexuals. He responded that some societies "where men are permitted to give themselves to satisfy other men's desires", and that "the society that we want to build does not permit such things." When she responded about the "boy they shot yesterday, for sodomy," he responded "Corruption, corruption. We have to eliminate corruption." A 1987 report of the United Nations Commission on Human Rights estimated that as many as 7,000 people were shot, hanged, stoned or burned to death after the 1979 revolution.

The new religious government that came to be established after the 1979 Iranian Revolution classed transsexuals and transvestites with gays and lesbians, who were condemned by Islam and faced the punishment of lashing and death under Iran's penal code. In 1986, transsexuals were re-classified as being "heterosexual".

Since the 1979 Iranian revolution, the legal code has been based on Islamic Shari'a law. All sexual relations that occur outside a traditional, heterosexual marriage (i.e. sodomy or adultery) are illegal and no legal distinction is made between consensual or non-consensual sodomy. Homosexual relations that occur between consenting adults in private are a crime and carry a maximum punishment of death. Forced homosexual relations (rape) often results in execution. The death penalty is legal for those above 18, and if a murder was committed, legal at the age of 15. (see Mahmoud Asgari and Ayaz Marhoni whose ages were raised to 19 in court transcripts). Approved by the Iranian Parliament on 30 July 1991, and finally ratified by the Guardian Council on 28 November 1991, articles 108 through 140 distinctly talk about homosexuality and its punishments in detail.

On 11 August 2005, a series of coordinated protests took place across France, Ireland, the United Kingdom, and other locations in response to the hangings of Ayaz Marhoni, 18, and Mahmoud Asgari, who was reported to be either 16 or 17 years old.

Amid the controversy surrounding official claims that the executed youths had sexually assaulted a 13-year-old boy, Afdhere Jama, editor of Huriyah, a digital magazine for Queer Muslims, stated that his contacts in Iran confirmed that the two young men hanged in Mashhad were lovers.

“When I first learned about the situation, I reached out to my Iranian contacts from Huriyah,” Jama explained. “Everyone agreed that these boys were murdered for being queer. One contact who had attended gay parties in Mashhad insisted that the boys were long-term partners, and another source revealed that a family member of one of the boys outed the couple.”

On 24 September 2007, while speaking at Columbia University, in answer to the question "Iranian women are now denied basic human rights and your government has imposed draconian punishments including execution on Iranian citizens who are homosexuals. Why are you doing those things?" Iranian President Mahmoud Ahmadinejad said, "We don't have homosexuals, like in your country. I don't know who told you that." An aide later said that he was misquoted and was actually saying that "compared to American society, we don't have many homosexuals." The aide further clarified that "because of historical, religious and cultural differences, homosexuality is less common in Iran and the Islamic world than in the West." A book on this topic is Women With Mustaches and Men Without Beards: Gender and Sexual Anxieties of Iranian Modernity, by Afsaneh Najmabadi.

In May 2021, a tragic case of homophobic violence occurred near the city of Ahvaz in Iran's Khuzestan province, where a 20-year-old Iranian man was kidnapped and decapitated by his half-brother and two cousins due to his sexual orientation. The victim, Ali "Alireza" Fazeli Monfared, became a symbol of the brutal consequences of homophobia in Iran. His death sparked widespread attention on social media, leading activists and celebrities to call for greater action against the persecution of LGBT+ individuals under the Islamic Republic.

In July 2023, three videos were leaked of ultra-conservative officials in Gilan province engaging in homosexual acts. The Iranian government was forced to acknowledge the videos in an official response, but attempted to punish those responsible for leaking the videos, with Deputy Speaker of Parliament Mojtaba Zonnour claiming that "the crime of those who released these videos is greater than the fornicators."

=== Transgender rights ===
One early campaigner for transsexual rights is Maryam Khatoon Molkara. Before the revolution, she had longed to transition physically to female but could not afford surgery. Furthermore, she wanted religious authorization. Since 1975, she had been writing letters to Ayatollah Khomeini, who was to become the leader of the revolution and was in exile. After the revolution, she was fired, forcedly injected with testosterone, and institutionalized. She was later released with help from her connection, and she kept lobbying many other leaders. Later she went to see Khomeini, who had returned to Iran. At first she was stopped and beaten by his guards, but eventually, Khomeini gave her a letter to authorize her sex reassignment operation. The letter is later known as the fatwa that authorizes such operations in Iran. The advancement of trans rights and the legal status of trans individuals in Iran was pivoted by Maryam Khatoon Molkara by not only securing the fatwa for herself, but for other trans people in Iran.

The Legal Medicine Organization of Iran made available certifications to transgender people. This led to opportunities for trans people to gain authorization for gender change surgery, hormonal procedures, health insurance, aid with financial and social issues, and new identification records. Nonetheless, those who have undergone gender reassignment surgery experience exclusion in society, discrimination, possible rejection from family members, gender-based violence, and issues with employment. These issues have often led to the higher rate of homelessness and substance abuse within the trans community. Although the illegality of same-sex intercourse and activities had not been thoroughly addressed, the legal differences between the LGB and trans Iranians are critical. Gaining social acceptance for the entire LGBT community as a whole was not of priority for government officials in Iran. Since same-sex conduct is criminalized, gender reassignment surgery became state-sanctioned as the cure for homosexuality, heteronormalizing people who have same-sex desires or engage in same-sex practices. Historian Afsaneh Najmabadi has articulated concerns that LGB persons have been encouraged to have gender reassignment surgery done to be socially accepted in Iran. Progressive actions for the trans community in Iran have led to social and legal isolation, institutional violence, and oppression for LGBT members who aren't transgender.

== Notable people ==
- Keyvan Khosrovani: Iranian architect, lighting designer, fashion designer and couturier. He was born in Tehran, and resides in Paris since 1978. He served as the fashion designer for Shahbanu Farah Pahlavi in the 1970s, and founded the Farah Pahlavi Foundation. Was known to be Gay.
- Freddie Mercury (Farrokh Bulsara): Lead singer of the legendary rock band Queen, born to Parsi parents from Gujarat, India, which has roots connected to the broader Iranian Zoroastrian community. Freddie Mercury is one of the most iconic figures in rock music history and is celebrated for his powerful voice and flamboyant stage presence.
- Arsham Parsi: An Iranian LGBT+ activist and founder of the Iranian Railroad for Queer Refugees (IRQR), which assists LGBT+ refugees from Iran. He has been a vocal advocate for LGBT+ rights, especially for Iranian refugees fleeing persecution.
- Shadi Amin: An Iranian LGBT+ rights activist, writer, and researcher based in Germany. Amin is also a co-founder of the Iranian Lesbian and Transgender Network (6Rang), which advocates for the rights of LGBT+ individuals, particularly Iranian lesbians and transgender people.
- Maryam Hatoon Molkara: An Iranian trans rights activist who played a crucial role in convincing the Iranian government to allow sex reassignment surgery. Her advocacy helped set a precedent in Iran, leading to a legal pathway for transgender individuals to undergo surgery.
- Nemat Sadat: An Afghan-Iranian journalist, writer, and LGBT+ activist who came out as gay in 2013. He is a vocal advocate for LGBT+ rights in the Middle East and South Asia and has written extensively about being a gay Afghan living in exile.
- Mehrdad Afsari: An Iranian artist and photographer known for his work exploring identity and sexuality. He has used his art to challenge social norms regarding gender and sexual orientation in Iranian society.
- Mullah Taha: An Iranian Shia gay cleric forced to flee Iran after conducting same-sex marriages.
- Elham Malekpoor Arashlu: She lives in the Netherlands and works as an LGBTQ rights activist, writer, and poet.

== See also ==
- LGBTQ rights in Iran
- LGBTQ history
