= VH1 Trailblazer Honors =

LGBT Awards Ceremony (United States)

The VH1 Trailblazer Honors, also known as the Logo Trailblazer Honors, is the only televised LGBT awards ceremony in the United States. It is an annual awards event founded in 2014 to recognize persons and entities who have made significant contributions towards minority empowerment and civil activism. It has been described as a combined "queer State of the Union, Hall of Fame, and Oscars." The event is aired on Logo TV and VH1.

== History ==
The VH1 Trailblazer Honors, also known as Logo Trailblazer Honors, is an annually televised awards event, founded in 2014, that recognizes persons and entities who have made significant contributions towards minority empowerment and civil activism. The event is the only LGBT awards ceremony televised in the United States. It has been described as a combined "queer State of the Union, Hall of Fame, and Oscars." In 2018, the event was aired on Logo TV and VH1.

In the 2014 inaugural event, Bill Clinton recognized Edith Windsor and Roberta A. Kaplan for their role in the Defense of Marriage Act. Jason Collins was presented the honor by Lance Bass. Demi Lovato honored cast members of Orange Is the New Black, including Danielle Brooks, Laverne Cox, Lea DeLaria, Taryn Manning, and Samira Wiley. Singer Michael Stipe honored John Abdallah Wambere. Young community leaders were introduced by Daniel Radcliffe. The event included musical performances by Sia, New York City Gay Men's Chorus, A Great Big World, and the band Exousia. The event was attended by celebrities including Joe Manganiello, Ed Sheeran, Jared Leto, Macklemore & Ryan Lewis, Kylie Minogue, Pete Wentz, Ariana Grande, Iggy Azaela, Tegan and Sara, and Laura Jane Grace.

In 2015, Miley Cyrus gave the opening address through a recorded message voicing support for marriage equality and the queer community. Barack Obama gave an address through a video message on the progress of LGBT people. Raven-Symoné and Martin Luther King III were speakers at the event. Musical performances included Adam Lambert and the Bleachers. Other speakers were Laura Jane Grace, Samira Wiley, Tituss Burgess, Tyler Posey, Kelly Osbourne, Betty DeGeneres, Violet Chachki, and Frankie Grande. Jane Fonda, Lily Tomlin, Judith Light, and Ian McKellen were also on stage. This was the first year that the honor "Social Trailblazer" was added. Logo fans voted between four nominees that used social media to advocate for the LGBT community. Nominees included Connor Franta, Joey Graceffa, Jackson Bird, and Gabe Dunn with Franta eventually being named the winner. On behalf of his deceased partner, Bayard Rustin, Walter Naegle accepted the honor. Judy and Dennis Shepard were recognized as "Trailblazing Parents" for co-founding the Matthew Shepard Foundation.

At the 2017 event, musicians, Hayley Kiyoko, Alex Newell, and Wrabel honored Cyndi Lauper with a performance of "True Colors."

The awards given in 2016 took time to remember the 49 victims of the Orlando nightclub shooting.

In 2018, the fifth annual Trailblazer Honors event took place at Cathedral of St. John the Divine, which is one of the first religious institutions in New York City supporting LGBTQ causes. The event was attended by activists and celebrities including Janet Mock, Bebe Rexha, the cast of Pose, and finalist from RuPaul's Drag Race.

== Honorees ==
Year	Name	Area of achievement	Ref(s)
2015	Connor Franta	YouTuber named Logo Social Trailblazer	
2015	Marsha Aizumi	Ally for trans community, founder of first PFLAG in California for Asian Americans, and author	
2015	Sheila Lopez	LGBT advocate and founder of PFLAG chapter for Native Americans in Phoenix, Arizona	
2015	Arsham Parsi	LGBT rights activist and founder of Iranian Railroad for Queer Refugees	
2015	Judy Shepard and Dennis Shepard	Parents of Matthew Shepard, advocates for LGBT rights, and co-founders of Matthew Shepard Foundation	
2015	Bayard Rustin	Leader in social movements for civil rights, socialism, nonviolence, and gay rights	
2016	The Advocate	The oldest and largest LGBT publication in the United States	
2014	Orange Is the New Black cast	For raising awareness on the lives of largely unseen characters in society. Honorees included Danielle Brooks, Laverne Cox, Lea DeLaria, Taryn Manning, and Samira Wiley.	
2014	John Abdallah Wambere	Ugandan gay rights activist and co-founder of Spectrum Uganda Initiatives	
2017	Jason Collins	First publicly gay athlete to play in any of the four major North American pro sports leagues	
2014	Roberta A. Kaplan	Lawyer for Edith Windsor in United States v. Windsor	
2014	Edith Windsor	LGBT rights activist and a technology manager at IBM	
2017	David Kohan and Max Mutchnick	Co-creators of sitcom Will & Grace	
2017	Alvin Ailey	Choreographer and activist who founded the Alvin Ailey American Dance Theater	
2017	Cleve Jones	AIDS and LGBT rights activist	
2016	Billie Jean King	Tennis champion who was forced to come out in 1981.	
2016	Harvey Fierstein	Playwright and actor	
2016	Subhi Nahas	Syrian refugee who is gay and survived torture at the hands of ISIS	
2016	Sylvia Rivera	Activist in the LGBT rights movement	
2016	Marsha P. Johnson	Activist in the LGBT rights movement	
2017	Cyndi Lauper	Singer-songwriter, actress, and LGBT rights activist	
2018	James Baldwin	Novelist and social critic who explored racial, sexual, and class distinctions	
2018	American Civil Liberties Union	Nonprofit organization aimed at the defense and preservation of constitutional rights and liberties	
2018	Ryan Murphy	Screenwriter, director, producer, and LGBTQ activist	
2018	Sybrina Fulton and Tracy Martin	Parents of Trayvon Martin	
2019	Nancy Pelosi	Speaker of the United States House of Representatives	
2019	Ava DuVernay	Filmmaker, director, and film distributor	
2019	Tarana Burke	Activist and founder of the Me Too movement	
2019	Margaret Atwood	poet, novelist, literary critic, essayist, inventor, teacher, and environmental activist	
