= Iranian Queer Organization =

LGBT advocacy group based in Toronto

Iranian Queer Organization (IRQO)
- Founded: 2007
- Founder: Arsham Parsi
- Dissolved: 2019; 7 years ago
- Purpose: Advocacy for LGBT rights in Iran
- Location: Canada
- Origins: Persian Gay and Lesbian Organization (PGLO)
- Key people: Saghi Ghahraman, Niaz Salimi, Amir Bahar, Hamid Parnian, Sam Kosha, Ferdous Bamdad, Roshan Borhan
- Website: irqo.org

The Iranian Queer Organization (IRQO; Persian: سازمان دگرباشان جنسی ایران, romanized: Sazman Degarbashan Jensi Iran), also known as the Persian Gay and Lesbian Organization, was an advocacy group for LGBT rights in Iran based in Toronto, Ontario, Canada. The organization was founded by human rights activist Arsham Parsi and monitored violations of gay rights in Iran. Under the Islamic laws of Iran, homosexuality is punishable by death.

Arsham Parsi left the organization and founded a new organization called the Iranian Railroad for Queer Refugees.

While living in Iran in 2001, Parsi founded an internet group that later became known as the Persian Gay and Lesbian Organization. The organization produces a monthly email newsletter called Cheraq (light) and has 6000 members in Iran.

IRQO provided an avenue for homosexuals in Iran to communicate with like minded activists around the world. Following the Iranian election protests in 2009, IRQO distributed an open letter from university students in Iran deploring the state of gay rights in the country. The organization also published a letter from gay Iranian Mehdi Kazemi after his boyfriend was executed and he was at risk for deportation to Iran.

In 2008, IRQO was one of the two winners of the International Gay and Lesbian Human Rights Commission's (IGLHRC) Felipa de Souza Award and Arsham Parsi received that award at the ceremony.

IRQO dissolved the organization in March 2019.

== See also ==
- Mullah Taha
- LGBT rights in Iran
- Iranian Railroad for Queer Refugees
