= Saghi Ghahraman =

Iranian poet, publisher and activist for LGBT rights

- ساقی قهرمان
- Born: February 3, 1957 (age 69); Mashhad, Iran
- Citizenship: Canadian

Saghi Ghahraman (Persian: ساقی قهرمان, born February 3, 1957) is a Persian poet who is in the list of 100 Women (BBC) and is head of Iranian Queer Organization.

== Early life ==
Saqi Ghareman was born in Mashhad in 1957, they founded Gilgamishan Publishing House in 2010, which focuses on publishing Iranian queer literature. In 2007, Shargh newspaper was banned for publishing a poem from them. They are now living in Canada.
