= Afsari =

Afsari is a surname. Notable people with the surname include:

- Malek Afsari (born 1958), Bangladeshi film director
- Mehrdad Afsari (born 1977), Iranian photographer
- Rosy Afsari (1946–2007), Bangladeshi actress
