= Gilan sex scandals =

Series of leaked sex videos in Gilan, Iran

The Gilan sex scandals are a series of sex videos leaked in July 2023 that depict the involvement of some ultra-conservative officials in Gilan province, Iran, in homosexual activities, which are considered a crime by the state. Those who were involved in the scandals were a part of the Ministry of Culture and Islamic Guidance, which is responsible for enforcing the Islamic republic's prescribed lifestyle to the nation. The leaked videos exposed the double standards of the officials involved. The whistleblower revealed the details on a Telegram channel named "Radio Gilan." Homosexuality is illegal in Iran, and punishable by imprisonment, abuse, fines, or execution.

The main controversy in the public opinion revolved around the "hypocrisy" of officials.

Following the emergence of the sex tape on social media, Iranian officials maintained an initial silence. However, the Cultural and Islamic Guidance Department of Gilan ultimately released a statement on July 22, 2023, acknowledging the "alleged lapse of judgment by the director of Islamic guidance in Gilan." The statement communicated that the matter had been "submitted for meticulous evaluation by the judicial authorities" and cautioned against exploiting the video to "undermine the esteemed cultural stance of the Islamic Revolution."

== Involved people ==
=== Reza Seghati ===
Reza Seghati is the director general of the office of the Ministry of Culture in Gilan province, situated in northern Iran. Preceding this role, he served in various capacities within the General Administration of the department, including overseeing the Khatam-ul-Anbiya artistic complex situated in Rasht. In 2012, he was instrumental in establishing the religious center of Hosseinieh Honar in Rasht, concurrently joining the board of another religious institution, the Gilan Cultural Front, in 2014. The main patron of Hosseinieh Honar, as identified by Ensaf News, is Vahid Jalili. A video leaked on July 19, 2023, showed Seghati engaging in same-sex intercourse with a young man. This video surfaced on a Telegram channel titled "Gilan News". Seghati appeared to be unaware of the presence of a camera in the room. Notably, the Ministry of Culture offices in various provinces are responsible for issuing permits for cultural and artistic productions. In practice, these offices play a role in censoring and ensuring conformity with Islamic values and Sharia law. Seghati is recognized for his staunchly conservative stance, prominently advocating for enhanced restrictions on women's social liberties. This includes the imposition of stricter regulations concerning mandatory headscarves. One of his notable initiatives involved spearheading the "Neighbourhood Hijab and Virtue Chastity" campaign in Gilan province, aimed at enforcing headscarf laws.

Seghati was dismissed from his position following the release of the leaked video.

In September 2025, Seghati was found guilty of engaging in homosexual acts and sentenced to 100 lashes and a one-year prison term, having avoided the death penalty.

=== Mohammad Safari ===
On July 21, footage featuring Mohammad Safari, a fundamentalist and a member of the Anzali Municipal Council in Gilan province, emerged on social media. The video captures him engaging in the act of smoking opium and masturbating while engrossed with his mobile phone.

=== Mahdi Haghshenas ===
Following closely in the wake of the preceding scandals, another controversy erupted on July 30 in the form of an alleged explicit video call involving two Mullahs, an esteemed title for clergymen or leaders of mosques. Reportedly, one of these Mullahs is identified as Mahdi Haghshenas, the former deputy of the Office for the Propagation of Virtue and the Prevention of Vice in Gilan Province. The second individual featured in the video is purportedly his brother-in-law, the husband of his wife's sister, who is also a Mullah. Numerous overseas Iranian media sources have affirmed the video's authenticity. The Office for the Propagation of Virtue and the Prevention of Vice holds a prominent role within the Iranian regime's framework, tasked with enforcing Sharia law on the nation's populace. Haghshenas is recognized for his staunch advocacy of extreme interpretations of Sharia law, his imposition of societal constraints, his aversion to scientific pursuits, and his opposition to vaccination initiatives.

Haghshenas, recognized for his stance against social freedoms, modern scientific advancements, and vaccinations, is reportedly engaged in sexually explicit conversations with the husband of his wife's sister. Media reports indicate that these conversations include references to their past sexual interactions. In 2017, as women activists initiated the "White Wednesday" protests against the compulsory headscarf (hijab), sparked by the arrest of a woman who had removed her white headscarf and displayed it on a pole, Haghshenas organized a solitary counter-demonstration. He held up a banner proclaiming, "I Am a Revolutionary." Seghati and Haghshenas had met each other previously.

== Consequences ==
The release of the homosexual video featuring Seghati sparked a strong reaction across Iranian social media platforms, with online users accusing him of blatant hypocrisy. Despite being hailed as a "champion of Islamic values and the Islamic family" by conservative factions within Gilan province, who endorse his extremist viewpoints, these videos suggest a dual existence he is leading. As reported by Iranian media, Seghati was "replaced" from his position as director general without any accompanying explanation. Notably, this incident led to the arrest of seven other individuals connected to this situation. Surprisingly, despite the video's widespread circulation, Seghati himself has not been subject to legal repercussions. However, it seems that the state is refraining from prosecuting Seghati for his actions, instead actively pursuing the individual responsible for recording, leaking, and disseminating these videos. Mojtaba Zolnouri, the Deputy Speaker of the Parliament of the Islamic Republic, asserted, "The transgressions of those who disseminated these videos outweigh those of the participants." Reza Seghati has chosen not to offer any commentary on the video. A few days following the video's release, the individual behind the Telegram channel "Gilan News," which initially shared these videos, came forward, revealing that he had been subjected to death threats. He also stated that his family members had been briefly detained in Iran.

The scandal further ignited conjecture regarding the potential involvement of a power struggle within Gilan province. Historical instances have shown that allegations of same-sex relations were employed as a means to eradicate political adversaries. As conveyed by Peyman Behbodi, who oversees Gilan Radio's Telegram channel, operatives from Gilan's Intelligence Department have apprehended the implicated official's sister and nieces. Gilan Radio, in multiple instances, had voiced censure against Seghati, characterizing him as an antagonist to provincial Governor Asadollah Abbasi.

However, Mojtaba Zolnouri, the deputy speaker of the Iranian parliament, expressed that the true wrongdoers were the individuals responsible for leaking the videos that caused embarrassment to Iran's religious leadership. During a visit to a monastery in northern Gilan province, Zolnouri remarked, "The transgression committed by those who disseminated these videos of fornication exceeds that of the individuals involved in the act". The videos were subject of discussion even within the country's National Security Council.

== See also ==
- Saeed Toosi
- Mullah Taha
