= Mehdi Kazemi =

Iranian man (born 1989)

Mehdi Kazemi (مهدی کاظمی, born 1989) is an Iranian man who is wanted in Iran for sodomy. Originally in the UK to study, he was granted asylum by Britain in 2008.

== Background ==
Since the 1979 Iranian revolution, the legal code has been based on a conservative interpretation of Islamic Shari'a law. All sexual relations outside of heterosexual marriage (i.e. sodomy or adultery) are illegal and no legal distinction is made between consensual or non-consensual sexual activity. Homosexual relations that occur between consenting adults in private are a crime and carry a maximum punishment of death.

== Asylum case ==
Kazemi moved to London to study English in 2004 but later discovered that his boyfriend had been arrested by Iranian police, charged with sodomy and hanged. Fearing the same fate, he applied for asylum in Britain but was denied in 2007. Kazemi then fled to the Netherlands to apply for political asylum, but was refused in accordance with the 2003 Dublin Convention, which prevents application for asylum in more than one EU country. Kazemi was held in a detention centre pending return to the UK. If he returned to Iran he would have been at risk of imprisonment. After a sustained campaign by several supporters, including Simon Hughes, Michael Cashman MEP, Peter Tatchell and Middle East Workers' Solidarity, Home secretary Jacqui Smith agreed to review his case when he returned to the UK. He was refused asylum in the Netherlands and returned to the UK April 4, 2008.

On March 22, Middle East Workers' Solidarity and National Union of Students staged a protest opposite Downing Street in defence of Kazemi. Several LGBT student organisations also attended, including the Manchester, Bradford, and Leeds University LGBT Societies. The demonstration demanded that Kazemi should not be sent to Iran, and that he should be allowed to stay in Britain.

On May 20, Kazemi's case for asylum was accepted by the British government.

== See also ==
- LGBT rights in Iran
- Homosexuality and Islam
- Kiana Firouz
