= Marsha Aizumi =

American author

Marsha Aizumi (May 28, 1947 - December 18, 2025) was an American author, educator, and LGBTQ+ activist. She co-founded the first PFLAG chapter for Asian-Pacific Islanders.

== Activism ==
Aizumi was motivated to improve schools for LGBTQ youth after seeing the harassment her transgender son faced. She founded the first PFLAG chapter for Asian-Pacific Islanders. The chapter began hosting events for specific ethnic groups, with Aizumi leading projects for the Japanese community such as the 2014 and 2016 Okaeri conferences. With the Los Angeles LGBT Center, Aizumi created the Courageous Conversations initiative to educate school district officials on LGBT youth issues and bullying. In 2012, she co-authored a book with her son. In 2015, Aizumi received a VH1 Trailblazer Honor for her allyship to the transgender community.

Aizumi wrote a column called "A Mother's Take" for the Pacific Citizen, the national newspaper for the Japanese American Citizens League.

== Personal life ==
Marsha Ogino was born in Cleveland, Ohio. Aizumi and her husband adopted Ishinomaki-born Aiden Aizumi as a baby. Her child first identified as a lesbian before transitioning from female to male.

== Selected works ==
- Aizumi, Marsha; Aizumi, Aiden (2012). Two Spirits, One Heart: A Mother, Her Transgender Son, and Their Journey to Love and Acceptance. Peony Press. ISBN 978-0-615-68171-9. OCLC 840932684.
