= Kevin B. Anderson =

American sociologist

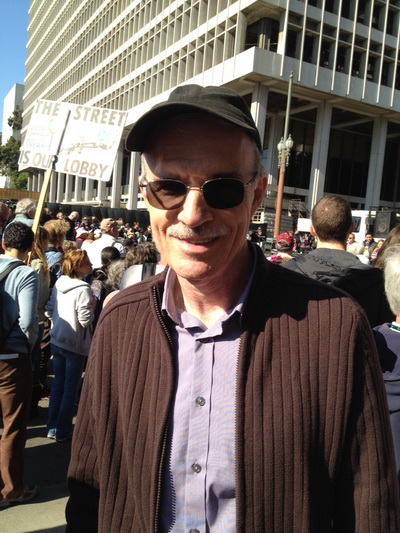
- Born: 1948 (age 77–78)
- Occupation: Sociologist
- Spouse: Janet Afary

Academic background
- Education: Trinity College, City University of New York Graduate Center
- Thesis: Lenin, Hegel and Western Marxism
- Website: kevin-anderson.com

Kevin B. Anderson (born 1948) is an American sociologist, Marxist humanist, author, and professor. Anderson is Professor of Sociology, Political Science and Feminist studies at University of California, Santa Barbara (UCSB). He was previously Professor of Sociology at Northern Illinois University, in DeKalb and Professor of Political Science, Sociology and Women's Studies at Purdue University.

== Early life and education ==
Anderson attended Tenafly High School in Tenafly, New Jersey and attained a BA degree in history from Trinity College (Connecticut) and an MA degree and a PhD in sociology from the City University of New York Graduate Center. His dissertation was on Lenin's reception of Hegel's dialectics, which was later published as Lenin, Hegel and Western Marxism from the University of Illinois Press.

== Career ==
He was involved in the international project of the complete works of Marx and Engels (Marx-Engels-Gesamtausgabe) and working especially on Volume IV/27, which contains a significant amount of the late Marx's notebooks on non-Western and precapitalist societies.

He has also written widely on Marxist theory, Michel Foucault, the Frankfurt School, and contemporary developments in the U.S. and Europe. Anderson obtained American Council of Learned Societies Fellowship and International Erich Fromm Prize in 1996 and 2001 respectively, and National Endowment for the Humanities Collaborative Research Grant in 2001. He again received an American Council of Learned Societies Fellowship in 2019.

His Erich Fromm and Critical Criminology (coedited with Richard Quinney) won the International Erich Fromm Prize from the International Erich Fromm Society in Tübingen, Germany in 2000. More recently, his book Marx at the Margins won Paul Sweezy Book Award from the Marxist Section of the American Sociological Association in 2011. In addition, his Foucault and the Iranian Revolution co-authored with Janet Afary was awarded with the Latifeh Yarshater Award for the Best Book in Iranian Women's Studies in 2006.

In the American Sociological Association, he has also served as Chair of the Section on Marxist Sociology and of the Section on the History of Sociology and Social Thought, as a Council Member of the Sections on Theory and on the History of Sociology, and as a member of the W. E. B. Du Bois Career of Distinguished Scholarship Award Selection Committee.

Anderson is married to Janet Afary, a fellow professor at UCSB.

== Works ==
=== Monographs ===
- Lenin, Hegel, and Western Marxism: A Critical Study. University of Illinois Press, 1995 ISBN 978-0-25202-167-1. (translated into Chinese, Japanese, and Turkish)
- Marx at the Margins: On Nationalism, Ethnicity, and Non-Western Societies. University of Chicago Press, 2010, ISBN 978-0-22601-983-3. (translated into Persian, French, Arabic, Portuguese, Turkish, and Japanese)
- The Late Marx’s Revolutionary Roads: Colonialism, Gender, and Indigenous Communism. Verso Books, 2025, ISBN 978-1-80429-687-5.

=== Book of Essays ===
- Dialectics of Revolution: Hegel, Marxism, and Its Critics Through a Lens of Race, Gender, and Colonialism. Daraja Press, 2020, ISBN 9781988832753.

=== Co-authored books ===
- Afary, Janet; Anderson, Kevin B. (2005). Foucault and the Iranian Revolution: Gender and the Seductions of Islamism. Chicago, Illinois: University of Chicago Press. ISBN 9780226007854. (translated into Turkish and Portuguese)

=== Books edited ===
- with Eric A. Plaut: Marx on Suicide. Northwestern University Press, 1999, ISBN 978-0-81011-638-2.
- with Richard Quinney: Erich Fromm and Critical Criminology: Beyond the Punitive Society. University of Illinois Press, 1999, ISBN 978-0-25206-830-0.
- with Peter Hudis: Raya Dunayevskaya: The Power of Negativity: Selected Writings on the Dialectic in Hegel and Marx. Lexington Books, 2002, ISBN 978-0-73910-267-1.
- with Peter Hudis: The Rosa Luxemburg Reader. Monthly Review Press, 2004, ISBN 978-1-58367-103-0.
- with Russell Rockwell: The Dunayevskaya-Marcuse-Fromm Correspondence, 1954–1978: Dialogues on Hegel, Marx, and Critical Theory. Lexington Books, 2012, ISBN 978-0-73916-836-3.
- with Bertell Ollman: Karl Marx. Ashgate Pub Co, 2012, ISBN 978-0-75467-757-4.
- with Kieran Durkin and Heather A. Brown: Raya Dunayevskaya's Intersectional Marxism: Race, Gender, Class, and the Dialectics of Liberation. Palgrave Macmillan, 2021, ISBN 978-3-030-53716-6.

== See also ==
- Marxist Humanism
- Raya Dunayevskaya
