= Gender Identity Organization of Iran =

Iranian non-governmental organization

Gender Identity Organization of Iran (GID) is an Iranian non-governmental organization established in 2008 to support people with gender identity problems.

The organization is composed of clinicians, psychiatrists and psychologists. The aim of the NGO is to help the target community with their medical, legal and social problems.

== See also ==
- LGBT rights in Iran
