= Cul-de-sac (2010 film) =

- Directed by: Ramin Goudarzi Nejad; Mahshad Torkan
- Written by: Ramin Goudarzi Nejad; Mahshad Torkan
- Produced by: Ramin Goudarzi Nejad; Mahshad Torkan
- Starring: Kiana Firouz
- Cinematography: Ramin Goudarzi Nejad
- Edited by: Ramin Goudarzi Nejad
- Music by: Roy Todd
- Release date: 20 May 2010
- Running time: 98 minutes
- Country: United Kingdom
- Language: Persian

Cul-de-sac is a feature film produced by Ramin Goudarzinejad and Mahshad Torkan, Iranian human rights activists and filmmakers based in London. It premiered on 20 May 2010. The film is focused on the plight of homosexuals — in this case, lesbians — in Iran.

== Overview ==
Kiana Firouz, an Iranian lesbian who had left Iran to avoid of getting arrested, meets Sayeh, a journalist and activist focused on Iranian human rights issues in the United Kingdom. Sayeh tries to collect some information about the controversial subject of Iranian homosexuals' lives from Kiana, who had formerly tried to make an underground documentary about the suffering of lesbians in Iran. The story develops the relationship between Kiana and Sayeh against the background of recent uprisings in Iran and the series of incidents that led Kiana to collaborate with the opposition and eventually resulted in her claim of asylum in the United Kingdom.

== Reception ==
The film was largely well received by critics.
