= LGBTQ rights in Iran =

- Iran
- Legal status: Same-sex relations illegal: Islamic law is applied.
- Penalty: Execution, imprisonment, lashings, fines.
- Gender identity: Sex reassignment surgery, which is required to change legal gender, is legalized and is partially paid for by the government.
- Military: No
- Discrimination protections: None

Family rights
- Recognition of relationships: No recognition of same-sex unions
- Adoption: No

Lesbian, gay, bisexual, transgender, and queer (LGBTQ) people in Iran face severe challenges not experienced by non-LGBTQ residents. Sexual activity between members of the same sex is illegal and can be punishable by death. Contrastingly, people can legally change their sex at birth, though only through sex reassignment surgery.

LGBTQ rights in Iran have come in conflict with the penal code since the 1930s. In post-revolutionary Iran, any type of sexual activity outside a heterosexual marriage is forbidden. Same-sex sexual activities are punishable by imprisonment, corporal punishment, fines, or execution. Gay men have faced stricter enforcement actions under the law than lesbians.

The Government of the Islamic Republic of Iran is considered to be one of the most discriminatory towards homosexuals in the world. It is estimated that hundreds or thousands of people were executed in the immediate aftermath of the 1979 revolution of whom some 20 were homosexuals.

Transgender identity is recognized through sex reassignment surgery. Sex reassignment surgeries are partially financially supported by the state. Some homosexual individuals in Iran have been pressured to undergo sex reassignment surgery in order to avoid legal and social persecution for being gay.

== LGBT history in Iran ==
Around 250 BC, during the Parthian Empire, the Zoroastrian text Vendidad was written. It contains provisions that are part of sexual code promoting procreative sexuality that is interpreted to prohibit same-sex intercourse as sinful. Ancient commentary on this passage suggests that those engaging in sodomy could be killed without permission from a high priest. However, a strong homosexual tradition in Iran is attested to by Greek historians from the 5th century onward, and so the prohibition apparently had little effect on Iranian attitudes or sexual behavior outside the ranks of devout Zoroastrians in rural eastern Iran.

There is a significant amount of literature in Persian that contains explicit same-sex illustrations. A few Persian love poems and texts from prominent medieval Persian poet Saadi Shirazi's Bustan and Gulistan have also been interpreted as homoerotic poems.

Under the rule of Mohammad Reza Pahlavi, the last Shah of the Pahlavi dynasty, homosexuality was criminalised, though it was mostly tolerated even to the point of allowing news coverage of a mock same-sex wedding. Janet Afary has argued that the 1979 Iranian Revolution was partly motivated by moral outrage against the Shah's government, and in particular against a mock same-sex wedding between two young men with ties to the court. She says that this explains the virulence of the anti-homosexual oppression in Iran. Reza Pahlavi, Crown Prince and the son of Mohammad Reza Pahlavi, argued that LGBTQ individuals had freedom before the "Mullah Regime" (the 1979 Revolution). After the revolution, thousands of people were executed in public, including some homosexuals.

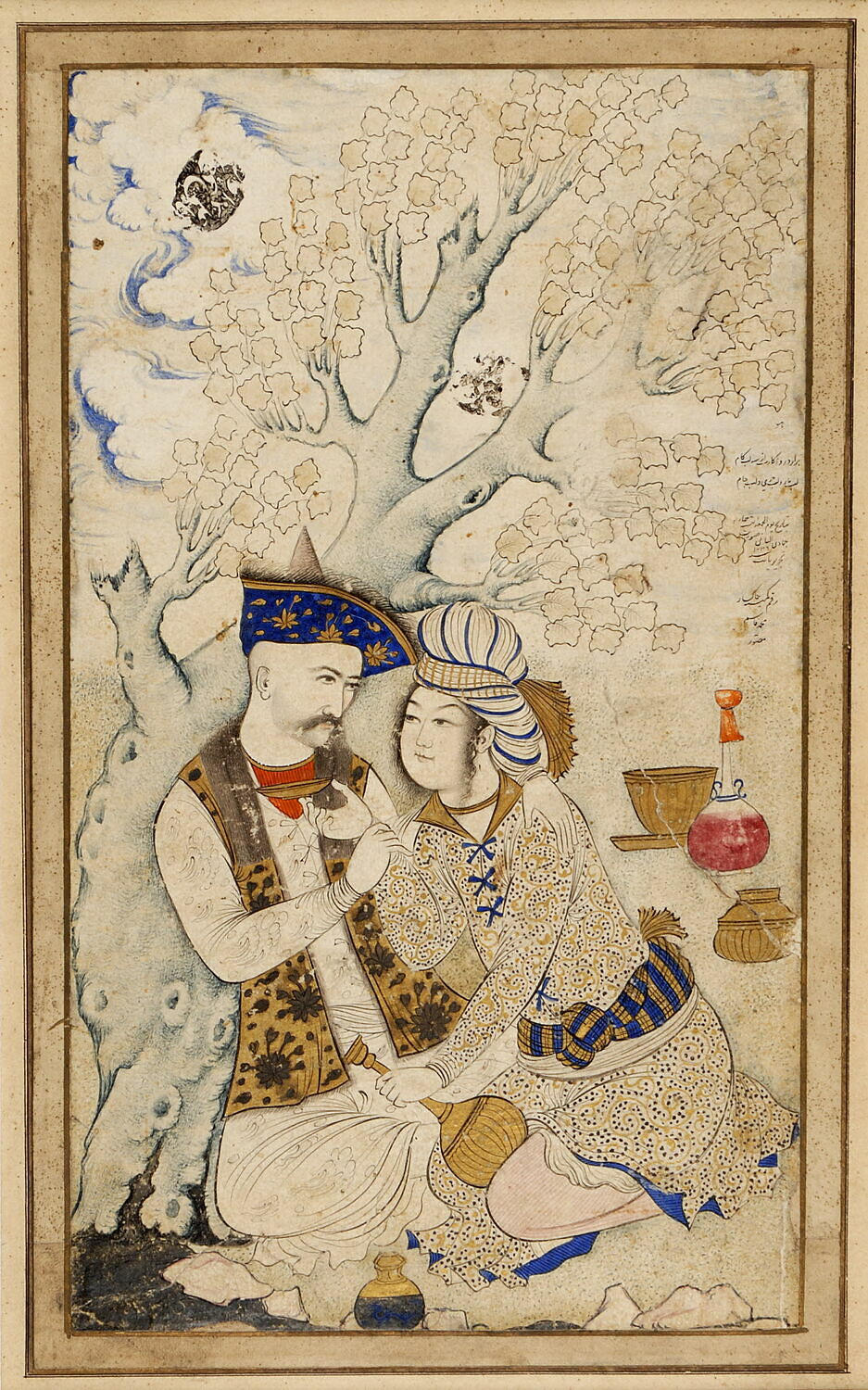
Persian miniature depicting Abbas the Great with a page. By Muhammad Qasim, 1627, Safavid era. Louvre, Paris.

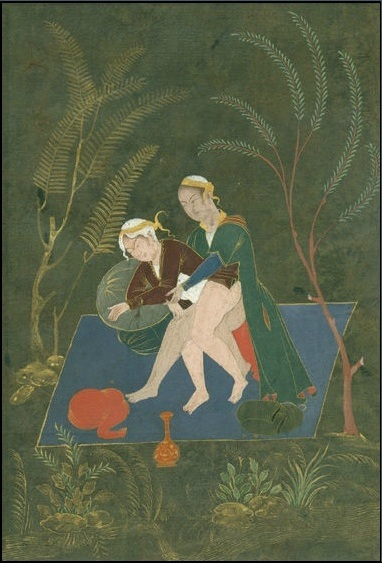
Watercolour on paper depicting two men engaged in anal sex. 1660 – 1720, Safavid era. Kinsey Institute, Bloomington, Indiana.

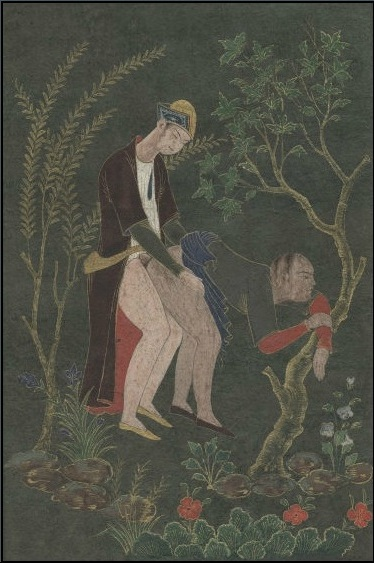
Watercolour on paper depicting two men engaged in anal sex. 1660 – 1720, Safavid era. Kinsey Institute, Bloomington, Indiana.

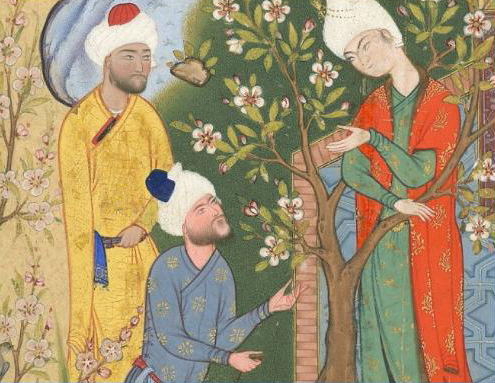
A depiction of a youth conversing with suitors from Jami's Haft Awrang, in the story A Father Advises his Son About Love. Smithsonian Institution, Washington, DC.

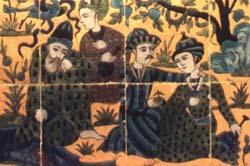
Men and youths depicted on a Safavid ceramic panel from Chehel Sotoun, Isfahan. Louvre, Paris.

== Legality of same-sex sexual activity ==
Since the 1979 Revolution, the legal code has been based on Islamic law. Despite allowing sex reassignment surgery, homosexuality in Iran remains a crime punishable by death. In Iran, this framework is viewed as a means to "correct" individuals who may otherwise express same-sex desires, offering an option to conform to heteronormative standards (Najmabadi, 2011, p. 534). All sexual activities that occur outside a traditional Islamic marriage (i.e., sodomy or adultery) are illegal. Same-sex sexual activities that occur between consenting adults are criminalized and carry a maximum punishment of death, though not generally implemented. Rape, whether same-sex or opposite-sex, often results in execution, but is related to adultery and sodomy in Iran's penal code rather than being classified as "sexual assault". The death penalty is legal for those above 18, and if a murder was committed, legal at the age of 15. The current Islamic Penal Code of Iran was introduced in 2013; it was preceded by the Islamic Penal Code of 1991, before which the pre-Revolutionary Penal Code of 1973 applied, as amended by the penal bills of 1982.

The charges of same-sex sexual activity have in a few occasions been used in political crimes. Other charges had been paired with the sodomy crime, such as rape or acts against the state, and convictions are obtained in grossly flawed trials. On March 14, 1994, famous dissident writer Ali Akbar Saidi Sirjani was charged with offenses ranging from drug dealing to espionage to homosexual activity. He died in prison under disputed circumstances.

=== Male same-sex sexual activity ===
Article 233 of the 2013 version of the Islamic Penal Code of Iran defines sodomy (lavāt) as the "penetration of genital organ up to foreskin of a man into anus of a male human". Under article 234, the receptive partner receives the death penalty; the insertive partner receives the death penalty if they used force or coercion, are married, or if they are non-Muslim and the receptive partner is Muslim; otherwise, the penalty for the insertive partner is one hundred lashes. Article 235 punishes intercrural sex between men with one hundred lashes; a man placing his penis between a man's buttocks without inserting it into the rectum is also classified under article 235. However, under article 235, if the active partner is non-Muslim and the passive partner is non-Muslim, the penalty is execution. Article 237 criminalises all other physically intimate acts between men, with a punishment of between thirty-one and seventy-four lashes, chosen by judicial discretion. Under article 114, if the offender repents of a capital crime prior to conviction, and the judge considers the repentance to be genuine, then the penalty may be reduced to flogging, imprisonment, or even a reprimand; if the offender repents after conviction, the judge may submit a request to the Supreme Leader for the offender to be pardoned.

=== Female same-sex sexual activity ===
Under articles 238 and 239 of the 2013 Islamic Penal Code, the punishment for tribadism (female-female genital contact) is one hundred lashes. Under article 136, a woman convicted of tribadism for a fourth time receives the death penalty. The 2013 Penal Code does not contain any explicit provision criminalizing other cases of female-female sexual contact.

=== Capital punishment ===
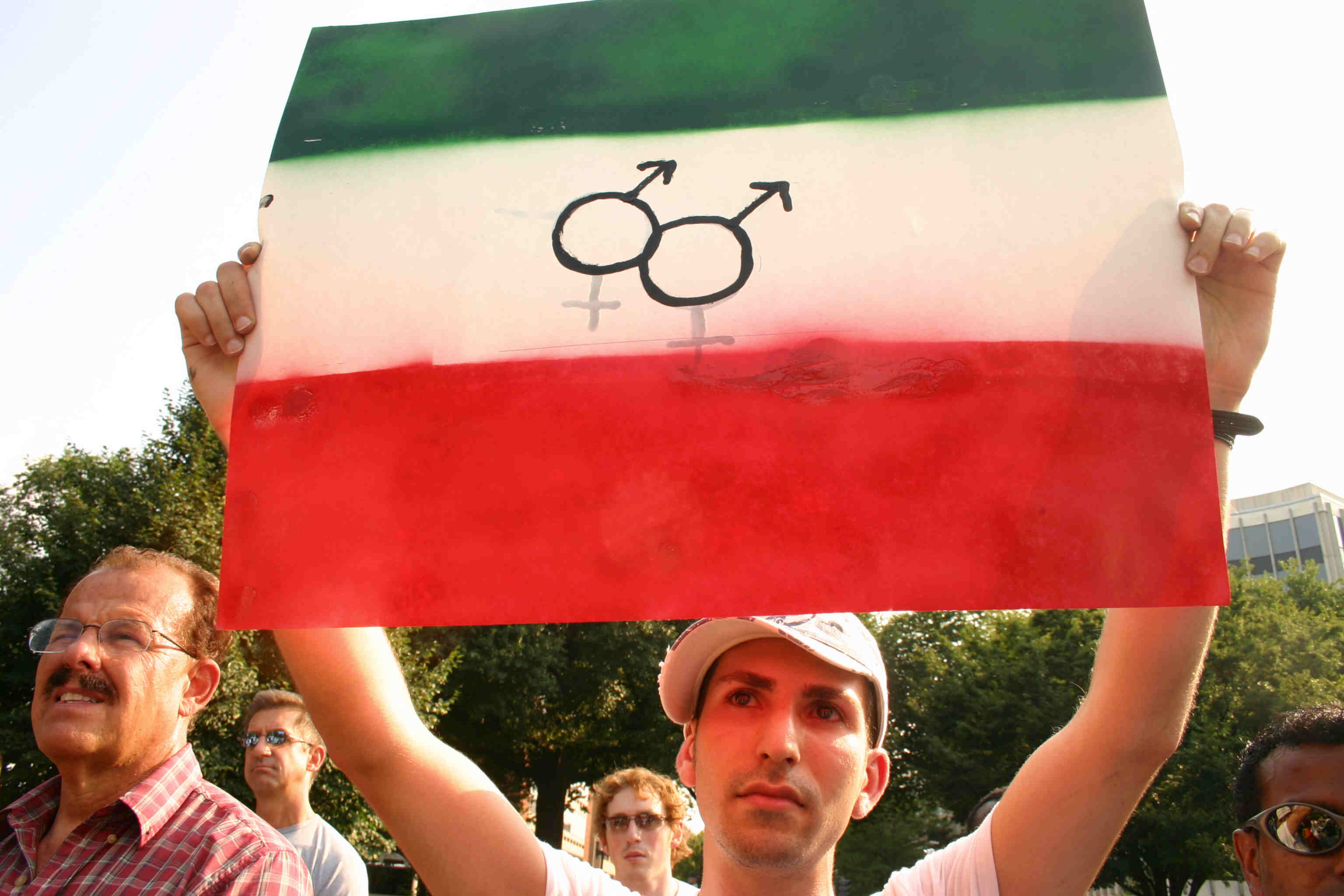
A protester of the killing of homosexual people in Iran. Washington, DC. July 19, 2006.

According to The Boroumand Foundation, there are records of at least 107 executions with charges related to homosexuality between 1979 and 1990. According to Amnesty International, a male homosexual was executed in January 1990 under unclear circumstances that is no reason was given. At least five people convicted of homosexual activity, three men and two women were executed in January 1990 as a result of the government policy of demanding executions of those who "practice homosexuality".

LGBTQ rights activists Zahra Seddiqi Hamedani and Elham Choubdar were sentenced to death in 2021 by a court in Iran for "promoting homosexuality, promoting Christianity and communicating with media opposed to the Islamic Republic". The sentence was confirmed by Iran's judiciary, but said the charges involved "human trafficking and not activism". On September 5, 2022, Iran's official IRNA news agency reported that the two women had been sentenced to death on charges of "corruption on earth" and human trafficking. The European Union condemned the death sentences on September 13, 2022.. Seddiqi Hamedani (also known as Mansouri) was reported to live in Cologne, Germany in December 2023, while Choubdar's sentence was overturned by the Supreme Court of Iran, and the activist was later sentenced to three years in prison.

==== Sodomy ====
Few consenting participants of sodomy (lavāt) are sentenced to death, but prior to 2012, both partners could receive the death penalty. On March 15, 2005, the daily newspaper Etemad reported that the Tehran Criminal Court sentenced two men to death following the discovery of a video showing them engaged in sexual acts to which they confessed. Another two men were allegedly hanged publicly in the northern town of Gorgan for sodomy in November 2005. In July 2006, two youths in north-eastern Iran were hanged for "sex crimes", probably consensual homosexual acts. On November 16, 2006, the State-run news agency reported the public execution of a man convicted of sodomy in the western city of Kermanshah. In January 2022, after serving six years on death row as a result of a sentence for "sodomy by force" when they were accused of rape by a 16 year old boy (one year past the age of majority), two gay men were initially reported to have been executed in the city of Maragheh.. The website HRANA who first had announced their execution, later updated the report saying that the death sentences were commuted to life in prison

=== Arrests ===
On January 23, 2008, Hamzeh Chavi, 18, and Loghman Hamzehpour, 19, were arrested in Sardasht, West Azerbaijan, for homosexual activity. An on-line petition for their release began to circulate around the internet. They apparently confessed to the authorities that they were in a relationship and in love, prompting a court to charge them with mohārebe ("waging war against God") and lavāt (sodomy).

There were two reported crackdowns in Isfahan, Iran's third-largest city. On May 10, 2007, Isfahan police arrested 87 people at a birthday party, including 80 suspected gay men, beating and detaining them through the weekend. All but 17 of the men were released. Those who remained in custody were believed to have been wearing women's clothing. Photos of the beaten men were released by the Toronto-based Iranian Railroad for Queer Refugees. According to Human Rights Watch, in February 2008, the police in Isfahan raided a party in a private home and arrested 30 men, who were held indefinitely without a lawyer on suspicion of homosexual activity.

In 2016, Mullah Taha an Iranian Shia gay cleric was forced to flee Iran by the Iranian authorities after conducting same-sex marriages.

In April 2017, 30 men were arrested in a raid in Isfahan Province, "charged with sodomy, drinking alcohol and using psychedelic drugs".

== Recognition of same-sex relationships ==
Same-sex marriage and civil unions are not legally recognized in Iran. Traditional Iranian families often exercise strong influence in whom, and when, their children marry and even what profession they chose. Few LGBTQ Iranians come out to family due to the fear of being rejected. No legislation exists to address discrimination or bias motivated violence on the basis of sexual orientation or gender identity.

Traditional Iranian families tend to prohibit their children from dating, as it is not a part of Iranian culture, although this has become somewhat more tolerated, among liberals. In 2004, an independent film, Circumstances (2011) was released, directed by Maryam Keshavarz, that examined the changing mores of Iranian youth when it comes to sex and dating.

Gay Iranian couples are often afraid to be seen together in public, and report that LGBTQ people were widely stereotyped as being sex-obsessed child molesters, rapists, and disease-ridden.

== Gender identity and expression ==
Before the 1979 Islamic Revolution, the Iranian government did not address the issue of transsexuality. However, in 1964, while in exile under the shah's regime, Ayatollah Ruhollah Khomeini issued a fatwa approving sex reassignment surgeries.

As Article 20 in Clause 14 states, a person who has sex reassignment surgery can legally change their name and gender on the birth certification upon the order of court.

Those who are in favor of legitimately being able to reassign one's sex surgically utilize article 215 of Iran's civil code, stating that the acts of every person should be subject to rational benefit, meaning gender reassignment surgery would be in the best interest of whoever is appealing for governmental support. Caveats, however, include the need to have medical approval from a doctor that supports a dissonance between assigned gender and their true gender.

Although legally recognized by the then Supreme Leader in Iran, Grand Ayatollah Ali Khamenei, Grand Ayatollah Yousef Madani Tabrizi addressed gender reassignment surgery as "unlawful" and "not permissible by Sharia [Islamic law]" . In his view, this was because it altered God's creation and disfigured vital organs.

In 1976, the Iranian Medical Association ruled that such surgeries were unethical, except for intersex individuals (hermaphrodites).

Since the mid-1980s, the Iranian government has legalized the practice of sex reassignment surgery (under medical approval) and the modification of pertinent legal documents to reflect the reassigned gender. In 1983, Khomeini passed a fatwa allowing gender reassignment operations as a cure for "diagnosed transsexuals", allowing for the basis of this practice becoming legal. In 1985, Khomeini reaffirmed his earlier fatwa, once again permitting the procedure.

Some homosexual individuals in Iran have been pressured to undergo sex reassignment surgery in order to avoid legal and social persecution.

Iran's medical and legal endorsement of sex reassignment often pushes individuals who express gender nonconformity or same-sex attraction toward sex reassignment, framing it as a way to normalize their gender identity in accordance with societal expectations of heteronormativity (Najmabadi, 2011, p. 534). If a transsexual individual can avoid committing sins or what it refers to as "same-sex playing" (Persian: همجنس‌باز, romanized: hamjinsbâz), such as engaging in same-sex acts, they are not required to undergo bodily alterations (Najmabadi, 2014, p. 82). Several Maraj’e Taghlid have stressed that sex reassignment is not permissible for individuals who are simply cross-dressers or those who engage in same-sex behavior. Hujatal Islam Kariminia asserts that society is largely unaware of the clear distinction between homosexuality and transsexuality, comparing the gap between the two to the "Great Wall of China" (Najmabadi, 2014, p. 185).

Tanaz Eshaghian's 2008 documentary Be Like Others highlighted this. The documentary explores issues of gender and sexual identity while following the personal stories of some of the patients at a gender reassignment clinic in Tehran. The film was featured at the Sundance Film Festival and the Berlin International Film Festival, winning three awards. Sarah Farizan's novel If You Could Be Mine explores the relationship between two young girls, Sahar and Nisrin, who live in Iran through gender identity and the possibility of undergoing gender reassignment surgery. In order for the two to be in an open relationship, Sahar considers surgery to work within the confines of law which permits relationships after transitioning due to the relationship being between a male and female.

Trans men and trans women are treated differently from each other in Iranian society. Trans men are more visible socially and are able to find acceptance in society more easily than trans women, who are often misgendered and put in the same category as gay men.

== Blood donation ==
Homosexuals and bisexuals are banned from donating blood in Iran. The ban also extends to lesbians.

== Censorship ==
In 2002, a book entitled Witness Play by Cyrus Shamisa was banned from shelves (despite being initially approved) because it said that certain notable Persian writers were homosexuals and bisexuals.

In 2004, the Tehran Museum of Contemporary Art loaned a collection of artwork that formerly belonged to Shah Mohammed Reza Pahlavi that had been locked away since the Revolution in 1979 to the Tate Britain. The artwork included explicit homoerotic artwork by Francis Bacon and the government in Iran stated that upon its return, it would also be put on display in Iran.

In 2005, the Iranian Reformist paper Shargh was shut down by the government after it interviewed an Iranian author, living in Canada. While the interview never mentioned the sexual orientation of Saghi Ghahreman, it did quote her as stating that, "sexual boundaries must be flexible... The immoral is imposed by culture on the body". The conservative paper Kayhan attacked the interview and the paper, "Shargh has interviewed this homosexual while aware of her sick sexual identity, dissident views and porno-personality." To avoid being permanently shut down, the paper issued a public apology stating it was unaware of the author's "personal traits" and promised to "avoid such people and movements."

== Violence ==
In May 2021, a 20-year-old Iranian, Ali Monfared, was murdered, allegedly by his half-brother and cousins, days after the military mailed him a document exempting him from military service because of his sexual orientation.

LGBTQ Iranians have fled Iran in recent years hoping to gain asylum in Europe.

== Exiled political parties and groups ==
The government in Iran does not allow a political party or organization to endorse LGBTQ rights. Vague support for LGBTQ rights in Iran has fallen to a handful of exiled political organizations.

The Green Party of Iran has an English translation of its website that states, "Every Iranian citizen is equal by law, regardless of gender, age, race, nationality, religion, marital status, sexual orientation, or political beliefs" and calls for a "separation of state and religion".

The Worker Communist Party of Iran homepage has an English translation of its manifesto that supports the right of "All adults, women or men" to be "completely free in deciding over their sexual relationships with other adults. Voluntary relationship of adults with each other is their private affair and no person or authority has the right to scrutinize it, interfere with it or make it public".

The leftist Worker's Way, the liberal Glorious Frontiers Party, and the center-right Constitutionalist Party of Iran have all expressed support for the separation of religion and the state, which might promote LGBTQ rights.

== LGBT rights movement ==
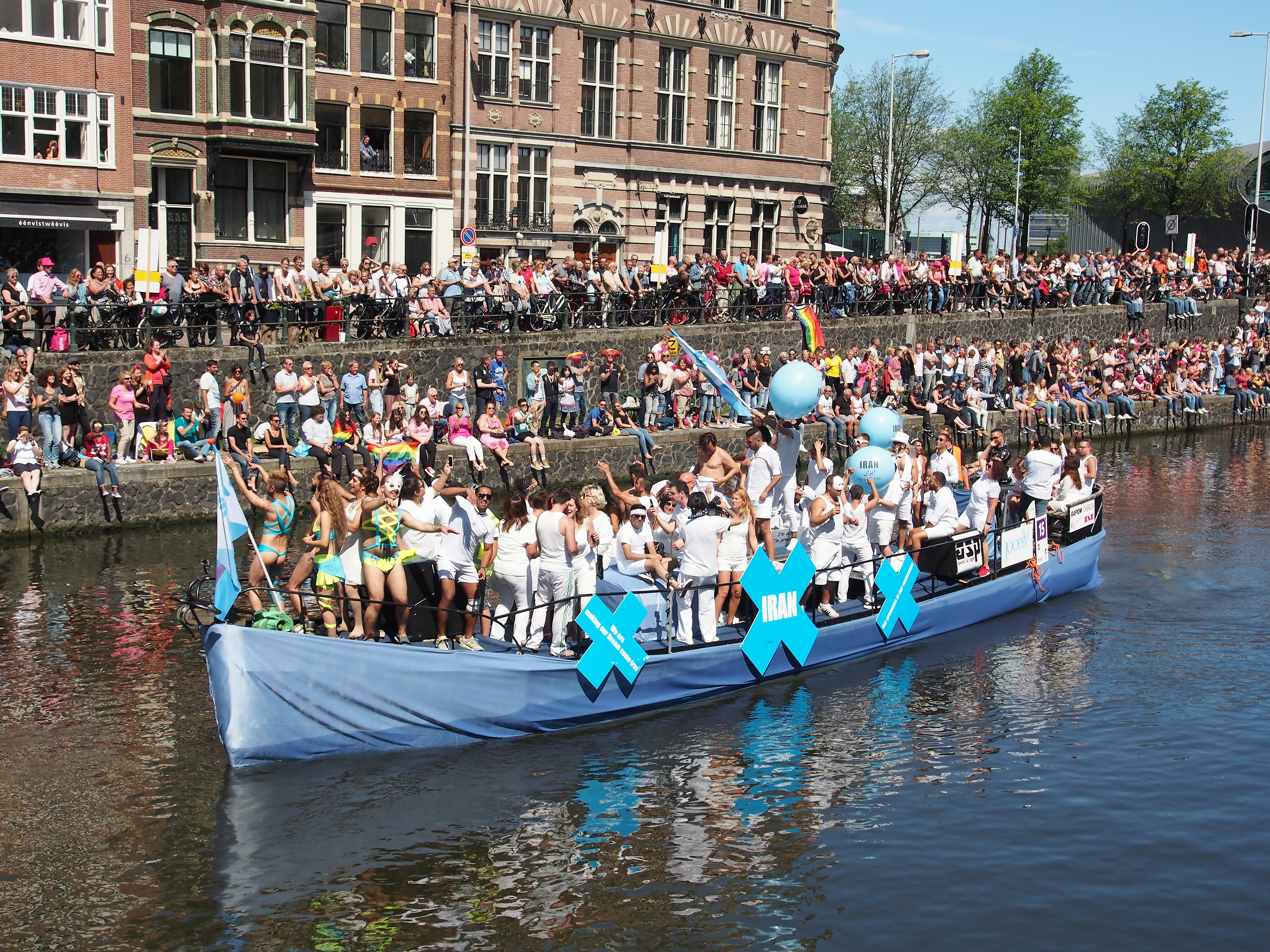
Boat 15 Iran, 2017 Amsterdam Gay Pride.

In 1972, scholar Saviz Shafaie gave a public lecture on homosexuality at Pahlavi University and in 1976 would research sexual orientation and gender issues at Syracuse University. In the 1990s, he joined the first human rights group for LGBTQ Iranians, HOMAN, and continued his work until he died of cancer in 2000.

In 2001, an online Iranian LGBTQ rights organization called "Rainbow" was founded by Arsham Parsi, a well-known Iranian gay activist, followed by a clandestine organization named the "Persian Gay and Lesbian Organization". As of 2008, this group has been renamed as the "Iranian Railroad for Queer Refugees" (IRQR). While the founder of this group had to flee Iran and continue his work as an exile, there is an underground LGBTQ rights movement in Iran.

Ali Mafi, an openly gay Iranian-born comedian started his career in 2016. In all his shows, Mafi mentions his status as an Iranian citizen and his commitment to being proud of who he is regardless. Mafi currently resides in San Francisco, California, which hosts a prominent gay community.

In 2007, the Canadian CBC TV produced a documentary that interviewed several LGBTQ Iranians who talked about their struggles.

During protests against the outcome of the Iranian election in July 2009, it was reported that several openly gay Iranians joined crowds of protesters in the United Kingdom and were welcomed with mostly positive attitudes towards LGBTQ rights.

In 2010, a group of LGBTQ activists inside Iran declared a day to be Iran Pride Day. The day is on the fourth Friday of July and is and celebrated annually in secret.

As of 2012, OutRight Action International develops an online resource for LGBTIQ Iranians in Persian.

JoopeA organized the Iran in Amsterdam Pride as the Iran Boat (Dutch: Iraanse Boot) in the Amsterdam Gay Pride festival in 2017 and 2018. The Iran Boat won the Best of Pride Amsterdam 2018 (Dutch: Publieksprijs) award.

The 2015 graphic novel Yousef and Farhad, published by OutRight Action International in English and Persian, explores the relationship between two young Iranian men. The story, produced in collaboration with Khalil Bandib, an American-Algerian political cartoonist, and Amir Soltani, a well-known Iranian-American author who is also the creator of the best-selling graphic novel "Behesht-e Zahra," highlights the struggles for acceptance and aims to foster understanding among families.

== HIV/AIDS ==
Despite the deeply conservative character of the government in Iran, its efforts to stop the spread of HIV/AIDS have been quite progressive. The first official reports of HIV/AIDS in Iran were reported in 1987, and a government commission was formed, albeit it was not until the 1990s that a comprehensive policy began to arise.

In 1997, Arash Alaei and his brother, Kamiar, were given permission to open up a small office for HIV/AIDS research among prisoners and with a few years, despite public protests, they helped open the first general HIV/AIDS clinics. A booklet was approved, with explanation of condoms, and distributed to high school students. By the late 1990s, a comprehensive educational campaign existed. Several clinics opened up to offer free testing and counseling. Government funds were allocated to distribute condoms to prostitutes, clean needles and drug rehabilitation to addicts and programs aired on television advocating the use of condoms. While there are shortages, medication is given to all Iranian citizens free of charge.

The Alaei brothers were joined in their educational campaign by Minoo Mohraz, who was also an early proponent of greater HIV/AIDS education, who chairs a research center in Tehran. Along with government funding, UNICEF has funded several Iranian volunteer based groups that seek to promote greater education about the pandemic and to combat the prejudice that often follows Iranians who have it.

In June 2008, the Alaei brothers were detained, without charge, by the government in Iran, after attending an international conference on HIV/AIDS. The government has since accused the two doctors of attending the conference as part of a larger plotting to overthrow the government.

In 2007, the government in Iran stated that 18,320 Iranians had been infected with HIV, bringing the official number of deaths to 2,800, although critics claimed that the actual number might've been much higher. Officially, drug addiction is the most common way that Iranians become infected.

While educational programs exist for prostitutes and drug addicts, no educational campaign for LGBTQ people has been allowed to exist. In talking about the situation Kaveh Khoshnood stated, "Some people would be able to talk about their own drug addiction or their family members, but they find it incredibly difficult to talk about homosexuality in any way". "If you're not acknowledging its existence, you're certainly not going to be developing any programs [for gays]".

== Asylum cases ==
The consequences of a same-sex relationship deemed a punishable crime or even death in Iran, results in a toil that forces many LGBTQ people to seek asylum in countries where the life situation is better. Many LGBTQ individuals seek refugee status from the UNHCR to be resettled in Australia, Canada, or the United States.

Some middle-class Iranians have received an education in a Western nation. There is a small population of gay Iranian immigrants who live in Western nations.

In 2001, the United Nations High Commissioner for Human Rights rejected a plea from an Iranian man who escaped from an Iranian prison after being convicted and sentenced to death for the crime of homosexual activity. Part of the problem with this case was that the man had entered the country illegally and was later convicted of killing his boyfriend, after he discovered that he had been unfaithful.

In 2005, the Japanese government rejected an asylum plea from another Iranian gay man. That same year, the Swedish government also rejected a similar claim by an Iranian gay man's appeal. The Netherlands is also going through a review of its asylum policies in regards to Iranians claiming to be victims of the anti-gay policies in Iran.

In 2006, the Netherlands stopped deporting gay men back to Iran temporarily. In March 2006, Dutch Immigration Minister Rita Verdonk said that it was now clear "that there is no question of executions or death sentences based solely on the fact that a defendant is gay", adding that homosexuality was never the primary charge against people. However, in October 2006, after pressure from both within and outside the Netherlands, Verdonk changed her position and announced that Iranian LGBTs would not be deported.

The United Kingdom came under fire for its continued deporting, especially due to news reports documenting gay Iranians who committed suicide when faced with deportation. Some cases have provoked lengthy campaigning on behalf of potential deportees, sometimes resulting in gay Iranians being granted asylum, as in the cases of Kiana Firouz and Mehdi Kazemi.

== Views of the government on homosexuality ==
Iran's state media have shown hatred toward homosexuals on many occasions. In particular, Mashregh News, a news website "close to the security and intelligence organizations", has described homosexuals in an article as "individuals who have become mentally troubled in natural human tendencies, have lost their balance, and require psychological support and treatment".

In October 2007, the then President of Iran Mahmoud Ahmadinejad, speaking to Columbia University, stated that "In Iran, we don't have homosexuals", though his spokesperson later stated that his comments were misunderstood.

In a November 2007 meeting with his British counterpart, Iranian member of parliament, Mohsen Yahyavi admitted that the government in Iran believes in the death penalty for homosexuality. According to Yahyavi, "if homosexual activity is in private there is no problem, but those in overt activity should be executed".

In a March 2013 interview on the state television, Iran's secretary of High Council for Human Rights, Mohammad-Javad Larijani called homosexuality an "illness" while denying the persecution of gay people in Iran. He stated that "Promoting homosexuality is illegal and we have strong laws against it. ... We consider homosexuality an illness that should be cured. We don't consider it acceptable to beat or mistreat homosexuals, either. ... [Homosexuality] is considered as a norm in the west and they are forcing us to accept it. We are strongly against this." This narrative matches the same anti-gay narrative in Bahrain, also amongst the Iranians of Bahrain, and the dominant narrative in Islamic-coded/majority countries, besides Israel, Jordan, and Turkey.

The Chief Justice of Iran, Sadeq Larijani at a 2014 conference in Tehran denied the execution of gay people in Iran, stating "That they say we execute homosexuals is not more than a lie. ... We do not provide these people with opportunity, but what they say that we hang them is a lie that they have fabricated for the Islamic Republic."

In June 2019, in a press conference held in Tehran between Mohammad Javad Zarif Minister of Foreign Affairs and Heiko Maas Minister of Foreign Affairs, openly gay German journalist Paul Ronzheimer of the tabloid Bild asked Zarif "Why are homosexuals executed in Iran because of their sexual orientation?", to which Zarif seem to affirm that execution of gay people takes place by saying that his "society has principles. And we live according to these principles. These are moral principles concerning the behavior of the people in general, and that means that the law is respected and the law is obeyed."

== Terms ==
- Hamjinsbaaz (Persian: همجنس‌باز, romanized: hamjinsbâz): This word is a compound word with prefix "ham" (same) and suffix "bâz" (player) added to the word jins (sex), which is translated into English as "same-sex player." This term is considered more derogatory than medical or social.
- Hamjinsgaraa (Persian: همجنسگرا, romanized: hamjinsgaraa): This is a different word for homosexuals (gays), with a different suffix garaa (desire) that can be translated to English as same-sex desire (homosexuality), it is used mainly for homosocial.
- Tarajinsi (Persian: تراجنسی, romanized: tarajinsi): is a relatively new term that has emerged in contemporary Iranian linguistic culture to refer to transsexual individuals. The prefix "tara" serves as an equivalent for "trans" in English, and when combined with the adjective "jinsi" (meaning "sexual"), it translates to "transsexual." Participants in this study generally understand "tarajinsi" as someone who is willing to undergo sex change surgery.

== Human rights reports ==
=== United States Department of State ===
==== Country Reports on Human Rights Practices of 2017 ====
Children
The review noted many concerns, including discrimination against girls; children with disabilities; unregistered, refugee, and migrant children; and lesbian, gay, bisexual, transgender, and intersex (LGBTI) minors.

Acts of Violence, Discrimination, and Other Abuses Based on Sexual Orientation and Gender Identity
The law criminalizes consensual same-sex sexual activity, which is punishable by death, flogging, or a lesser punishment. The law does not distinguish between consensual and nonconsensual same sex intercourse, and NGOs reported this lack of clarity led to both the victim and the perpetrator being held criminally liable under the law in cases of assault. The law does not prohibit discrimination based on sexual orientation and gender identity.

Security forces harassed, arrested, and detained individuals they suspected of being gay or transgender. In some cases security forces raided houses and monitored internet sites for information on LGBTI persons. Those accused of “sodomy” often faced summary trials, and evidentiary standards were not always met. Punishment for same-sex sexual activity between men was more severe than between women. According to international and local media reports, on April 13 at least 30 men suspected of homosexual conduct were arrested by IRGC agents at a private party in Isfahan Province. The agents reportedly fired weapons and used electric Tasers during the raid. According to the Canadian-based nonprofit organization Iranian Railroad for Queer Refugees, those arrested were taken to Dastgerd Prison in Isfahan, where they were led to the prison yard and told they would be executed. The Iranian LGBTI activist group 6Rang noted that, following similar raids, those arrested and similarly charged were subjected to forced “anal” or “sodomy” tests and other degrading treatment and sexual insults.

The government censored all materials related to LGBTI issues. Authorities particularly blocked websites or content within sites that discussed LGBTI issues, including the censorship of Wikipedia pages defining LGBTI and other related topics. There were active, unregistered LGBTI NGOs in the country. Hate crime laws or other criminal justice mechanisms did not exist to aid in the prosecution of bias-motivated crimes.

The law requires all male citizens over age 18 to serve in the military, but exempts gay men and transgender individuals, who are classified as having mental disorders. New military identity cards listed the subsection of the law dictating the exemption. According to 6Rang, this practice identified the individuals as gay or transgender and put them at risk of violence and discrimination.

The government provided transgender persons financial assistance in the form of grants of up to 45 million rials $1,240 and loans up to 55 million rials $1,500 to undergo gender reassignment surgery. Additionally, the Ministry of Cooperatives, Labor, and Social Welfare required health insurers to cover the cost of such surgery. Individuals who undergo gender reassignment surgery may petition a court for new identity documents with corrected gender data, which the government reportedly provided efficiently and transparently. NGOs reported that authorities pressured LGBTI persons to undergo gender reassignment surgery. this came from a publication from the US State Department.

== Summary table ==
Right	Legal status	Notes
Same-sex sexual activity legal	No No	Punishments include imprisonment, corporal punishment, execution, lashings, fines
Equal age of consent	No	
Anti-discrimination laws in employment only	No	
Anti-discrimination laws in the provision of goods and services	No	
Anti-discrimination laws in all other areas (incl. indirect discrimination, hate speech)	No	
Same-sex marriage	No	
Recognition of same-sex couples (e.g. unregistered cohabitation, life partnership)	No	
Stepchild adoption by same-sex couples	No	
Joint adoption by same-sex couples	No	
LGBTQ allowed to serve openly in the military	No	Based on Article 33 of the army's medical exemption regulations, "moral and sexual deviancy, such as transsexuality" is considered to be grounds for a medical exemption from the military service, which is mandatory for eligible male individuals over 18. According to Human Rights Watch, in order to "prove" their sexual orientation or gender identity, men seeking a military exemption on that basis would be required to undergo "numerous" "humiliating" physical and psychological tests, which may be costly, and they may also encounter administrative barriers, such as "few doctors" to perform such tests and doctors that refuse to perform them without parental accompaniment.
Right to change legal gender	Yes	(Since 1988 Sex reassignment surgery required.)
Access to IVF for lesbians	No	
Conversion therapy banned	No	
Commercial surrogacy for gay male couples	No	
MSM allowed to donate blood	No	
Female sex partners of MSMs allowed to donate blood	No	

== See also ==
- Human rights in Iran
- LGBT rights in the Middle East
- LGBT rights in Asia
- LGBT history in Iran
- Gender Identity Organization of Iran
- Be Like Others, a documentary film about transsexuality in Iran
- Transgender rights in Iran
- Murder of Ali Fazeli Monfared
- Capital punishment for homosexuality
- Mullah Taha
