= Sheila Lopez =

Sheila Lopez (born c. 1973) is an American electrical engineer and LGBTQ rights advocate. She founded and serves as president of the Native American PFLAG chapter in Phoenix, Arizona.

== Life ==
Lopez was born c. 1973 in Winslow, Arizona to a Navajo mother from Greasewood, Arizona and a Mexican father from Winslow. Lopez has three children- Samantha, Emanuel and Matthew. Her maternal grandfather was a medicine man. Lopez was pregnant in high school before starting college. She completed an undergraduate degree in electrical engineering from Northern Arizona University and became a member of the nonprofit organization AISES (American Indian Science and Engineering Society) in 1992. After graduation, Lopez joined HP Inc. as a manufacturing engineer. She joined Intel and worked in software testing, validation, and semiconductor fabrication.

Lopez joined PFLAG in 2009 after her two oldest children, Samantha and Emanuel identified as LGBTQ. In June 2011, she was the first person in the country to open a Native American PFLAG chapter. In 2015, Lopez received a VH1 Trailblazer Honor for her LGBTQ rights activism. In 2019, she organized the first pow wow for the Phoenix Native LGBTQ and two-spirit community with aid from the Phoenix Pride Community. She won the 2019 American Indian Science and Engineering Society Blazing Fame award.

Lopez attended events held by the Native Health Phoenix that addressed suicide prevention and awareness using indigenous art to bring community members together.

In 2020, the Native PFLAG Chapter was closed, with Lopez citing unavailable staff as reasons for its closure. Before its closure, the Native PFLAG Chapter made a donation of $14,000 to the Phoenix Indian Center to allow pow wows to continue to be held.

At the 2023 powwow, Lopez was still considered to be an avid and dedicated supporter for the Native LGBTQ+ people by the Indigenous advocate present at the event. After the tradition was picked back up again in 2023, the 2024 powwow was not only about celebrating and healing for two-spirit and queer native people, but it also highlighted the fight against anti-LGBTQ state and federal laws. One of those was the Diné Marriage Act, which banned Navajo same-sex marriages in 2005, but was under review for the first time since then in 2024.

Lopez hopes to be an influential to indigenous peoples in STEM and help encourage their growth in the field. She has advocated for not just indigenous peoples but people in color in general and has even helped people of color and women get into tech jobs.
