= Iran Pride Day =

Annual Iranian LGBT event

Iran Pride Day روز افتخار ایران
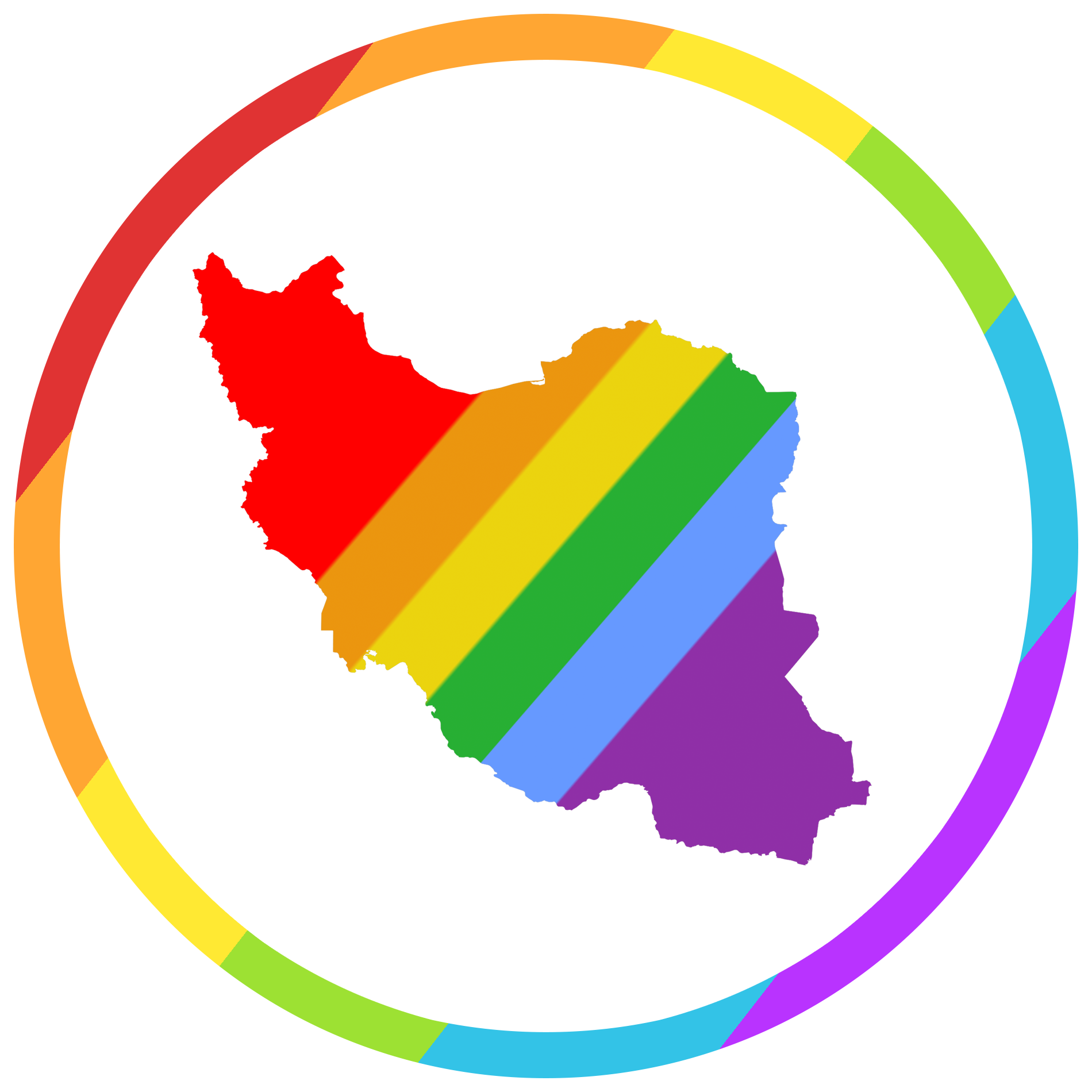
- Frequency: Annual
- Country: Iran
- Inaugurated: 2010
- Website: www.iranlgbt.com

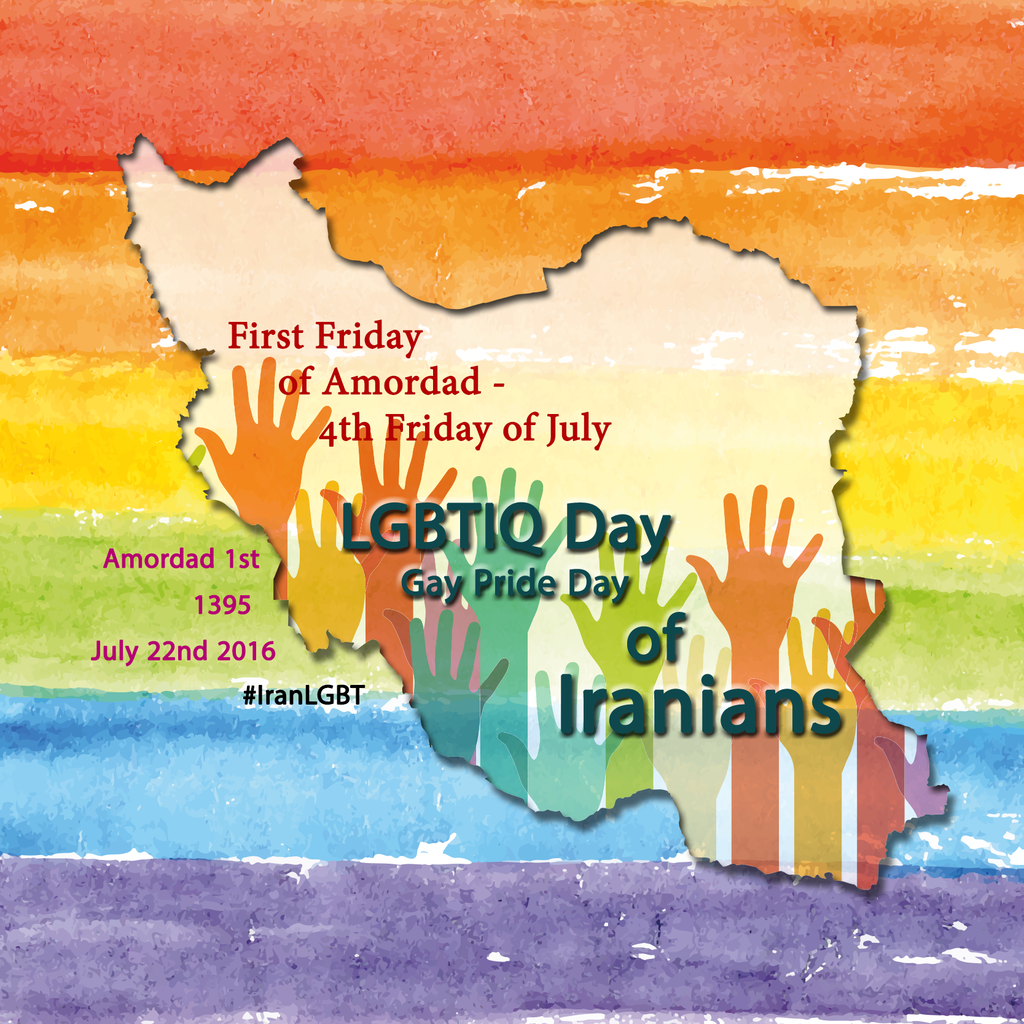
An English-language Iran Pride Day poster from 2016.

Iran Pride Day, National Day of Iranian LGBTs, or National Day Of Sexual Minorities (Persian: روز افتخار ایران) is an annual LGBT pride event held on the fourth Friday of July (first Friday of the Iranian month of Mordad) in Iran since 2010.

== Background ==
In Iran, same-sex sexual activity is illegal and could be punishable by the death penalty. According to Omar Kuddus, a UK-based gay rights activist, the Iranian government also uses trumped-up charges to execute and persecute gay people while disguising their actions from the international community. In 2007, at a forum Monday at Columbia University, former Iranian President Mahmoud Ahmadinejad said "In Iran, we don't have homosexuals like in your country. In Iran, we do not have this phenomenon".

== History ==
A small group of 20 to 30 LGBT activists, calling themselves "Rainbow[ies]" (رنگین‌کمانی‌ها, Ranginkamâniha), has been celebrating a Pride Day since 2010. The day was first announced by a group of Iranian LGBT activists on a blog in July 2010. Every year, Iranian LGBT activists gathered around the capital, Tehran, and secretly took pictures of themselves holding rainbow flags and written slogans. They had to hide their faces to avoid police harassment and possible prosecution. Activists have taken photos of the event in other cities, including Kerman, as well.

In 2017, for the first time, the organizers decided to hold the event in the open when they were offered the first float in the Amsterdam Gay Pride festival, although they had to cover their faces in order to avoid prosecution upon their return to Iran. About the 2017 event, organizers said, "Our grief is not dimmed, but we, the rainbows of Iran are screaming our happiness as a shape of resistance and we keep our euphoria alive as the torch of justice".

== Coverage ==
A week after the first celebration in July 2010, Resalat, a conservative newspaper in Iran, published an article about the event, which was also picked up by some other conservative media outlets in the country.

== See also ==
- LGBT rights in Iran
- List of LGBT rights activists
- List of LGBT rights organizations
- Pride parade
