= Killing of Ali Fazeli Monfared =

20-year old Iranian man murdered for being a homosexual

Ali Fazeli Monfared
- Born: January 2, 2001
- Died: May 4, 2021 (aged 20); Ahvaz, Iran
- Cause of death: Decapitation
- Other name: Alireza
- Known for: Victim of honor killing

Ali "Alireza" Fazeli Monfared (January 2, 2001 – May 4, 2021) was a 20-year-old Iranian man who was kidnapped and decapitated by three men, namely his half-brother and two cousins, near the city of Ahvaz in Iran's Khuzestan Province because of his sexual orientation. News of the situation garnered significant social media attention and coverage and calls by activists and celebrities to challenge homophobia in Iran.

== History ==
Identified as a case of honor killing, the murder by beheading was committed days after Fazeli Monfared's half-brother learned about his sexual orientation from his military service exemption card. Iran's military laws exempt gay people from mandatory military service. It is reported that Fazeli Monfared was planning to move to Turkey and seek asylum after receiving his military service exemption. Fazeli Monfared's mother was hospitalized after learning of the death, according to the Iranian LGBTQ+ rights group 6Rang, and his half-brother and cousins were arrested.

Iran's anti-LGBT military law outing gays has been blamed for Fazeli Monfared's murder.

According to individuals who had known Alireza Fazeli Monfared prior to his murder, he had faced years of homophobic and transphobic harassment, which he never reported to the police "out of a fear of facing violence and prosecution at the hands of the authorities."

== Response ==
Activists and celebrities, including American singer Demi Lovato, posted on social media about the murder to raise awareness of homophobia in Iran. Iranian LGBT activist Masih Alinejad, who lives in the United States, told Insider that "I went to look at his page and I found that he was so full of life. Immediately, I posted about his death on my social media and it went viral. I wish he had received this sort of attention while he was alive."

Many LGBT Iranians secretly filmed videos walking with their partners and exhibiting rainbow flags to protest against the killing. Human rights organization Amnesty International called for a full investigation into the murder and a revocation of Iran's anti-gay laws.

== See also ==
- Conscription in Iran
- LGBT rights in Iran
- PaykanArtCar, an artwork inspired by Ali Fazeli Monfared
- List of honor killings in Iran
- Capital punishment in Iran
- Capital punishment for homosexuality
