= John Abdallah Wambere =

Ugandan LGBT rights activist (born 1973)

- Born: 2 November 1973 (age 52); Mbale, Uganda
- Known for: Ugandan LGBT rights activist

John "Longjones" Abdallah Wambere is a Ugandan gay rights activist and co-founder of Spectrum Uganda Initiatives, a Kampala-based LGBTI rights advocacy organization with a focus on health education. Because of the threat of violence and persecution he faces in Uganda, Wambere was approved for asylum in the United States by the U.S. Citizen and Immigration Services on September 11, 2014. He currently resides in Cambridge, Massachusetts.

== Early life ==
Wambere was born in Mbala, Zambia on 2 November 1973. His family was Christian; his mother was midwife for the government and his father was in politics. In an interview on Legal Lines with Timothy Lynch, an LGBTQ Massachusetts Bar Association production, Wambere said of his childhood, "We heard about gay people. [People] spoke about gay people. But they were never condemned, they were never persecuted. No one went to torch their homes. They lived as part of the society, and some of them were appreciated as people of uniqueness, different people. And no one ever called them pedophiles."

Although he first realized his sexual attraction to men at eight years of age, Wambere wrote in his application for asylum that he "struggled with [his] emerging sexuality throughout [his] childhood, adolescence, and young adulthood... Living in an extremely anti-gay environment made me fear for my safety and the safety of my family should my sexuality become publicly known." However, he writes that in 1998, at twenty-six, "I realized that being gay made me happy because it is who I am. That was my truth, and that day, I washed my hands (and myself) of any notion of feeling sinful for who I am."

== Spectrum Uganda Initiatives ==
In 2001, Wambere became involved in Homo Uganda, which evolved into Spectrum Uganda Initiatives (Spectrum) in 2002. Founded in 1998, Spectrum is a community-based organization under Sexual Minorities Uganda that focuses on providing support and sexual health education for the LGBTI community. They hold workshops to encourage people to check their HIV/STI status and use condoms and proper lubricants; they also provide advocacy support to help combat LGBTI discrimination. Wambere hosted Sunday gatherings at his home to "talk about issues pertaining to our sexuality and health, discuss our experiences in our communities, and generally offer opportunities to meet and socialize with other members of the community." Wambere was elected to serve as Secretary of Spectrum in 2004.

== Tensions in Uganda ==
Uganda has a history of anti-gay laws that date back to its colonization by the British Empire. The Penal Codes of 1950, enacted by the ruling British government, contained sodomy laws that are still in force today. However, recent, intensifying anti-homosexual sentiment in Uganda has been associated with the dissemination of anti-gay rhetoric by evangelical Christians, particularly Scott Lively, who came to Kampala in March 2009. According to Stephen Langa, who organized the visit, Lively gave a series of talks about "the gay agenda — that whole hidden and dark agenda" — and the threat homosexuals posed to Bible-based values and the traditional African family." Later that year, a Ugandan politician proposed the Anti-Homosexuality Bill of 2009, which threatened the death penalty to those convicted of homosexuality. It did not pass.

However, on December 20, 2013, the Parliament of Uganda proposed the Uganda Anti-Homosexuality Act, 2014. The bill, which was signed into law by Ugandan President Yoweri Museveni on February 24, 2014, proposed a maximum sentence of life in prison for those found guilty of "the offence of homosexuality," "aggravated homosexuality," "conspiracy to engage in homosexuality," and "promotion of homosexuality," among others. Museveni was criticized by the UN, who said the law "violates basic human rights and endangers lesbians, gay, bisexual and transgender (LGBT) people in the country." The law was later annulled by Uganda's Constitutional Court on August 4, 2014, because it did not have the requisite quorum needed.

=== Increasing violence ===
In 2005, The Red Pepper, a Ugandan news tabloid, publicly outed Wambere as a gay man. It listed his name, place of work, and home and work addresses. Since then, several newspapers have described Wambere as a "feminine, dreadlocked homosexual who recruits young boys for sex." He was forced to move homes and change phone numbers several times; still, he continued to receive death threats. On 1 March 2014. In the article, Wambere was accused of being part of a "Ugandan Homo Cabinet." The tabloid was criticized by the Human Rights Watch for putting these men in danger of increased government harassment.

On WGBH-TV, Wambere said of Ugandan media, "I never outed myself. The media outed me… but at one time I found that I had to live the reality... We are Ugandans and we are Africans. And we were born homosexuals."

In the spring of 2009, Wambere was physically attacked by several men as he left Capital Pub, a local bar in Kampala. He was grabbed from behind and knocked unconscious; he later woke in a friend's car with a chipped tooth.

Wambere and David Kato, a friend of Wambere's and one of Uganda's most prominent LGBTI leaders, were both featured in Malika Zouhali-Worrall and Katherine Fairfax Wright's film Call Me Kuchu. It premiered at the Berlin International Film Festival on 11 February 2012. About a year before the film was released, on 26 January 2011, Kato was brutally murdered; he had just won lawsuit against a magazine which had published his name and photograph identifying him as gay and calling for him to be executed. Wambere began to receive death threats that he would be the next to die.

== Asylum in the United States ==
Wambere visited the United States on 20 February 2014 to rally support against the increasingly violent crackdown on the LGBTI community in Uganda. Three days after he landed, Ugandan President Yoweri Museveni signed the Uganda Anti-Homosexuality Act, 2014, into law.

Facing death threats and life imprisonment if he returned home, Wambere worked with GLAD to file for asylum with the U.S. Government. On 11 September 2014, the U.S. Government granted him asylum, pending a routine background check. "This has been a very, very difficult decision for me," said Wambere in a statement to the media. "I have devoted my life to working for LGBTI people in Uganda, and it gives me great pain not to be with my community, allies, and friends while they are under increasing attack. But in my heart, I know it is my only option, and that I would be of no use to my community in jail."

== Family ==
Wambere has a sixteen-year-old daughter who is still in Uganda, staying with relatives.
