= Elham Malekpoor Arashlu =

Iranian poet, writer and journalist (born 1983)

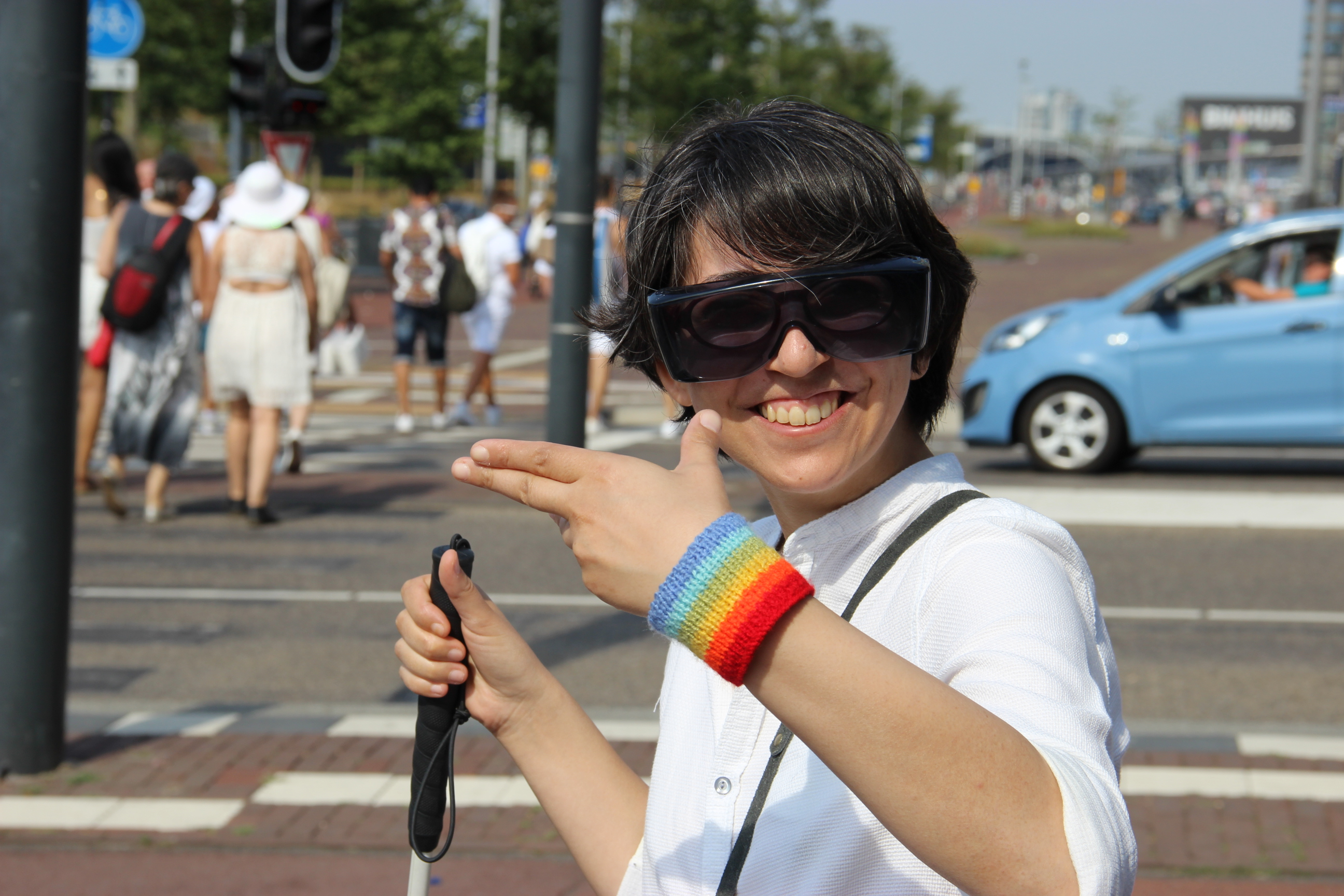
- Born: July , 1983; Iran
- Occupations: Human rights activist, journalist and poet

Elham Malekpoor Arashlu (Persian: الهام ملک‌پور ارشلو) or Elham Malepoor is an Iranian poet, writer and journalist. She was born in Iran and she is semi-blind.

== Biography ==
Elham was born in July 1983 in Iran. She graduated from Kerman University in Persian literature. She lives in the Netherlands and works as an LGBT rights activist, writer, and poet.

Elham left Iran in September 2012 due to threats against her. She has been a member of PEN International in the Netherlands since 2016. Elham worked in JoopeA Foundation as a member of management team from 2015 to 2018.

== Books ==
Elham published her first book of poems Jamaica is a country too... (Persian: که جامائیکا هم کشوری‌ست...) in 2006 in Iran.

Malekpoor is also the author of the books A chair to sit (Persian: صندلی برای نشستن), Historiography of Homan (Persian: تاریخ‌نگاری هومان) and Breaking the invertebrate flesh (Persian: منقار در گوشت بی‌مهره).
