= Kiana Firouz =

Iranian activist and filmmaker (b. 1983)

Kiana Firouz (Persian: کیانا فیروز; born 1983) is an Iranian activist and filmmaker currently residing in the UK.

== Early life and education ==
Kiana Firouz was born in 1983 in Tehran, Iran.

== Career ==
In 2010, she starred in the film Cul-de-Sac, a drama-documentary based on her own life and work, which was released in the UK in May 2010. In Iran, she worked underground as an activist for Iranian homosexual women's rights, shooting footage for a documentary about human rights abuses. Her activities having been discovered by Iranian security services, Firouz was forced to relocate to the UK.

She requested asylum from the British government, which was initially denied but later granted in June 2010. The policy turn around came after protracted campaigning on behalf of Firouz by human rights organizations including Amnesty International, which took the case to European authorities.

She is the author of 'Gordafarid is a queer', and 'An Artery: A love letter to England', as well as the creator of a graphic novel named 'Lines'.

Firouz collaborated with Iran International News TV Channel based in London for several years as an art and culture Producer. She has also contributed to 6rangiran NGO (The Iranian Lesbian and Transgender Network).

Firouz graduated with a degree in Film and Media from Birkbeck, University of London, and she is currently running a media company, called FirouzMedia.
