= Arsham Parsi =

Iranian LGBTQ activist

- Born: Shiraz, Iran
- Citizenship: Canadian-Iranian
- Years active: 2001–present
- Organization: International Railroad for Queer Refugees Marjan Foundation
- Known for: LGBT activism and refugee work
- Notable work: Leading the Iranian Queer Movement; Exiled for Love
- Title: Founder and Executive Director of the IRQR and Marjan Foundation
- Movement: Iranian queer movement, Green Movement
- Awards: Pride Toronto Excellence in Human Rights Award 2011; Felipa de Souza Award 2008; Logo TV Trailblazer Award 2015; Rainbow Warrior Award 2025
- Website: www.arshamparsi.net www.irqr.ca www.marjanfoundation.org

Arsham Parsi is an Iranian LGBT human rights activist living in exile in Canada. He is the founder and head of the International Railroad for Queer Refugees.

== Personal life ==
Parsi was born in Shiraz, Iran. As a gay Iranian, he felt alone until, at age 15, he discovered solace in the Internet. Parsi began volunteering for underground gay organizations. At age 19; he began working for PGLO and networked with doctors to provide HIV testing. He responded to emails from suicidal gay teenagers. The strict laws against homosexuality forced Parsi to keep his work secret from friends and family. But in March 2005, Parsi realized the police were looking for him and fled from Iran to Turkey, where he spent 13 months. Unable to return to Iran, Parsi lives in Toronto, Ontario, Canada.

== Activism ==
In 2001, Parsi formed a small LGBT group online called Rangin Kaman (Rainbow Group), renamed Persian Gay and Lesbian Organization in 2004. As the PGLO would not be recognized in Iran, a friend of Parsi's officially registered PGLO in Norway. The PGLO later became the foundation for Parsi's Toronto-based Iranian Queer Organization (IRQO) in 2006. Parsi later left IRQO and founded the International Railroad for Queer Refugees in 2008. The organization's headquarters are in Toronto, Ontario, Canada and they provide services to all self-identified Iranian LGBTs worldwide.

He began secretly working for the advancement of civil rights for lesbians and gays in Iran. In 2003, he helped organize a clandestine Yahoo chat group for gay Iranians, called Voice Celebration. The group had 50 participants who exchanged views on achieving civil rights. Less than three years later, he was asked to speak publicly in Geneva, Switzerland, at the second session of United Nations Human Rights Council and on the fourth anniversary, all international media published some articles about Iranian gays and lesbians.

Parsi was the executive director of the Iranian Queer Organization and director of the organization's online magazine, Cheraq for several years. In October 2008, he launched International Railroad for Queer Refugees. Parsi has been working on Iranian queer asylum cases.

He is an Iranian member of the International Lesbian and Gay Association (ILGA), based in Brussels, Belgium, and ambassador of Iran to the International Lesbian and Gay Cultural Network (ILGCN), based in Stockholm, Sweden. Director of the cultural committee at the Iranian Association of University of Toronto (IAUT) in 2007, Parsi is also a founding member of the Rainbow Railroad group based in Toronto, Ontario, Canada, and the Advisory Committee of the Hirschfeld Eddy Foundation.

Parsi's autobiography, Exiled for Love, was written with Marc Colbourne and published by Fernwood Publishing in 2015.

== International recognition ==
In April 2008, Iranian Queer Organization (IRQO), which was his former organization name awarded Felipa de Souza Award in 2008 by the New York-based International Gay and Lesbian Human Rights Commission (IGLHRC). Two months later, Parsi's work was recognized with the Pride Toronto Award for Excellence in Human Rights. In June 2015, Parsi was awarded by Logo TV for the International Trailblazer. Parsi is being featured in two galleries of Canadian Museum for Human Rights that is based in Winnipeg, Manitoba. Parsi and Marina Nemat are the only two Iranians that were selected for the museum.

== Documentaries ==
Parsi was interviewed by many major international media about the rights of LGBT people in Iran and Middle East and also featured in several documentaries including CBC Gay in Iran in 2007, A Jihad for Love by Parvez Sharma, and BBC's Iran Sex Change Solution by Ali Hamedani and many more.

== See also ==
- International Railroad for Queer Refugees
- LGBTQ rights in Iran
- Mullah Taha
