= Janet Afary =

American writer

- ژانت آفاری
- Born: New York City
- Other name: Janet Afary Anderson
- Spouse: Kevin B. Anderson
- Awards: Balzan Prize (2008–2009)

Academic background
- Education: University of Tehran, University of Michigan
- Thesis: Grassroots Democracy and Social Democracy in the Iranian Constitutional Revolution, 1906–1911 (Vol. I, II) (1991)
- Doctoral advisor: Ronald G. Suny, Kenneth Allin Luther
- Other advisors: Juan Cole, Gernot L. Windfuhr

Academic work
- Discipline: religious studies, history
- Institutions: Purdue University, University of California, Santa Barbara
- Website: www.janetafary.com

Janet Afary is an author, feminist activist and researcher of history, religious studies and women studies. She is a professor and the Mellichamp Chair in Global Religion and Modernity at the University of California, Santa Barbara (UCSB).

== Career ==
She received her M.A. degree from University of Tehran. In 1991, she received her PhD in History and Near East studies from the University of Michigan, in Ann Arbor. Afary is married to Kevin B. Anderson, a fellow professor at UCSB.

Her research fields includes politics of contemporary Iran and gender, sexuality in modern Middle East, constitutionalism, civil liberties, the public sphere in the Middle East, cinema and popular culture of the Middle East, global feminism, feminist theory, modern Transcaucasia & Central Asia: art and folklore. She is known for her writings and research on the Iranian Constitutional Revolution. Her articles have appeared in The Nation, the Guardian, and numerous scholarly journals and edited collections.

Afary is a professor of religious studies at the University of California Santa Barbara. She previously taught at in the History Department and Women's Studies at Purdue University. In the 1980s, she served as the coordinator for the Iranian Jewish Association of California. She has served as president of the International Society for Iranian Studies (ISIS-MESA), the Association for Middle East Women's Studies (AMEWS-MESA), and the Coordinating Council for Women in History of the American Historical Association (CCWH-AHA).

== Bibliography ==
=== Articles ===
- Afary, Janet; Afary, Kamran (2021). "Mollā Nasreddin and the creative Cauldron of Transcaucasia". British Journal of Middle Eastern Studies. 48 (4): 563–595. doi:10.1080/13530194.2019.1659130. ISSN 1353-0194. S2CID 203436235.
- Afary, Janet (2020). "The Place Of Shi'I Clerics in the First Iranian Constitution". I.B.Tauris. doi:10.5040/9780755608966.ch-003. ISBN 978-1-78453-134-8.
- Afary, Janet (2019). "Iran: A Modern History". Iranian Studies. 52 (3–4): 648–652. doi:10.1080/00210862.2019.1649005. ISSN 0021-0862. S2CID 203311254.
- Afary, Janet; Friedland, Roger (2018). "Critical theory, authoritarianism, and the politics of lipstick from the Weimar Republic to the contemporary Middle East". Critical Research on Religion. 6 (3): 243–268. doi:10.1177/2050303218800374. S2CID 155951849.
- Afary, Janet (2011). "'Mahnaz Afkhami: A Memoir'". Journal of Middle East Women's Studies. 1 (1): 147–157. ISSN 1558-9579.
- Afary, Janet; Schweickart, Patsy; Carroll, Bernice A (2006). "Feminism, Peace, and War". NWSA Journal. 18 (3): vii–x. ISSN 1527-1889.
- Afary, Janet (2005). "Civil Liberties and the Making of Iran's First Constitution". Comparative Studies of South Asia, Africa and the Middle East. 25 (2): 341–359. doi:10.1215/1089201X-25-2-341. ISSN 1548-226X. S2CID 143198998.
- Afary, Janet (2004). "Seeking a Feminist Politics for the Middle East after September 11". Frontiers: A Journal of Women Studies. 25 (1): 128–137. doi:10.1353/fro.2004.0028. ISSN 0160-9009. JSTOR 3347261. S2CID 153364608.
- Afary, Janet (2004). "The Human Rights of Middle Eastern &(and) Muslim Women: A Project for the 21st Century". Human Rights Quarterly. 26 (1): 106–125. doi:10.1353/hrq.2004.0002. ISSN 0275-0392. S2CID 143868026.
- Afary, Janet (1996). "Steering between Scylla and Charybdis: Shifting Gender Roles in Twentieth Century Iran". NWSA Journal. 8 (1): 28–49. ISSN 1040-0656. JSTOR 4316422.

=== Books ===
- Afary, Janet; Kamran, Afary (2022). Molla Nasreddin: The Making of a Modern Trickster, 1906-1911. Edinburgh University Press. p. 398. ISBN 9781474499507.
- Afary, Janet; Faust, Jesilyn (2021). Iranian Romance in the Digital Age: From Arranged Marriage to White Marriage. Bloomsbury Publishing. ISBN 9780755618286.
- Dehkhoda, Ali-Akbar; et al. (Janet Afary, John R. Perry) (2016). Charand-o Parand: Revolutionary Satire from Iran, 1907-1909. Translated by Afary, Janet. Yale University Press. p. 335. ISBN 9780300197990.
- Pregnancy and Miscarriage in Qatar: Women, Reproduction and the State (Sex, Family and Culture in the Middle East), 2020 (Contributor)
- Afary, Janet (2013). Agha, Najafī. Brill. ISBN 978-9-004-17678-2
- Afary, Janet (2011). "Women in Iran". In Rubin, Barry (ed.). Women in Iran. London, UK: Routledge. ISBN 978-0-7656-8094-5.
- Afary, Janet (2010). Contesting Archives: Finding Women in the Sources. University of Illinois Press. p. 223. ISBN 978-0-252-07736-4.
- Afary, Janet (2009). Sexual Politics in Modern Iran. Cambridge University Press. ISBN 9781107394353. (Winner of the British Society for Middle East Studies Annual Book Prize)
- Afary, Janet (2009). Enghelab-e Mashrouteh-ye Iran انقلاب مشروطۀ ایران. p. 570.
- Afary, Janet; Anderson, Kevin B. (2005). Foucault and the Iranian Revolution: Gender and the Seductions of Islamism. Chicago, Illinois: University of Chicago Press. ISBN 9780226007854. (Winner of the Latifeh Yarshater Book Award for Iranian Women's Studies, 2006)
- Afary, Janet (1997). The War against Feminism in the Name of the Almighty: Making Sense of Gender and Muslim Fundamentalism. New Left Review.
- Afary, Janet (1997). Spoils of War: Women of Color, Cultures, and Revolutions. Rowman & Littlefield Publishers. p. 198.
- Afary, Janet (1996). The Iranian Constitutional Revolution: Grassroots Democracy, Social Democracy, and the Origins of Feminism. History and Society of the Modern Middle East Series. New York City: Columbia University Press. ISBN 9780231103510.

== See also ==
- Politics of Iran

== Honours and awards ==
- She was the recipient of the Horace H. Rackham Distinguished Dissertation Award from the University of Michigan.
- Afary was awarded the Keddie/Balzan Fellowship by the International Balzan Prize Foundation for the 2008–2009 academic year to work at the University of California, Los Angeles (UCLA).
- Dehkhoda Award for Distinguished Scholarship in Iranian Studies (Germany).
