= International Railroad for Queer Refugees =

Iranian LGBTQ rights organization

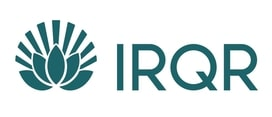
- Logo of International Railroad for Queer Refugees
- Abbreviation: IRQR
- Formation: 2008; 18 years ago
- Founder: Arsham Parsi
- Purpose: Advocacy work for LGBT rights in Iran
- Location: Canada
- Region served: Turkey
- Method: Networking, campaigning, advocacy, outreach, community media, TV and radio
- Key people: Arsham Parsi (head), Stuart Bustard, Robert Sabuda, Borga Dorter, Tad Munning, Sam Riazi
- Revenue: Donation
- Employees: 1 Full time and 1 Part time
- Volunteers: 9
- Website: irqr.net

The International Railroad for Queer Refugees (IRQR), formerly known as the Iranian Railroad for Queer Refugees, is an advocacy group for LGBT rights in Iran. Founded and led by Arsham Parsi, the organization assists Iranian LGBT individuals seeking safe refuge both inside and outside of Iran.

The IRQR is headquartered in Toronto, Ontario, Canada, where it provides assistance with asylum applications, housing, and financial aid. It also advocates to governments on behalf of Iranian LGBT individuals facing deportation to Iran, where homosexuality is a criminal offense punishable by death.

The organization's name was inspired by the Underground Railroad, which helped African Americans escape slavery in the 19th century.

== History ==
In August 2008, Arsham Parsi, Executive Director of IRQR, met with the office of the United Nations High Commissioner for Refugees (UNHCR) and the Canadian Embassy in Ankara, Turkey, to address the situation of queer Iranian asylum seekers.

Many of these refugees temporarily pass through Turkey while fleeing Iran, and Parsi sought to secure a better future for them in Canada. According to IRQR:

When Iranian queer people flee persecution in Iran, they often go to Turkey. The United Nations High Commissioner for Refugees interviews these refugees and determines if their asylum claim is valid. If they are granted asylum status, the UNHCR finds a new country for each individual based on their profile. IRQR assists these refugees throughout the process and, whenever possible, provides funds for safe houses through donations, as Turkey is also a homophobic and transphobic society, and queer people are not physically safe there.

— IRQR Website

In 2015, Arsham Parsi returned to Turkey to document the situation of refugees and provide on-the-ground services. Thanks to his work and that of the UNHCR, many LGBT refugees were able to secure interviews more quickly, receiving refugee status that allowed them to begin their journey to a new home and live freely as themselves.

In August 2016, the Canada Revenue Agency granted IRQR charitable status. In November 2018, IRQR expanded its services to non-Iranian LGBT individuals and officially changed its name to the International Railroad for Queer Refugees.

== Impact ==
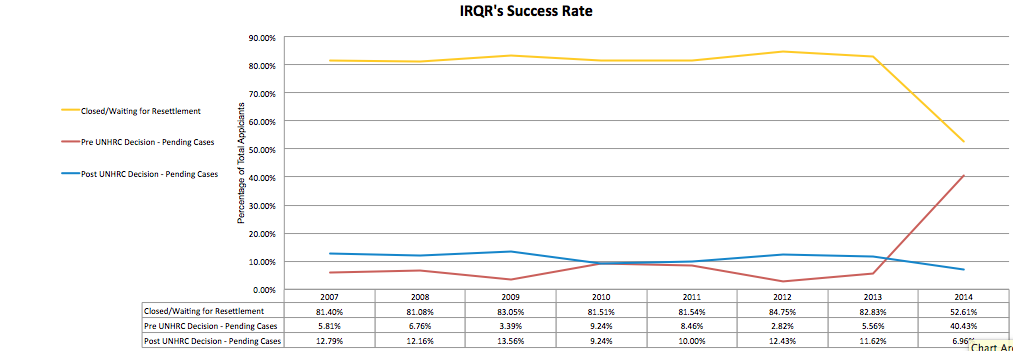
IRQR success rate

The IRQR documents and reports cases of torture, persecution, executions, and other human rights violations related to LGBT individuals in Iran. It also aims to educate individuals who oppose homosexuality due to a lack of sexual education, addressing "the current lack of self-recognition and self-confidence among queer individuals" and preventing "frequent tragedies, such as suicide."

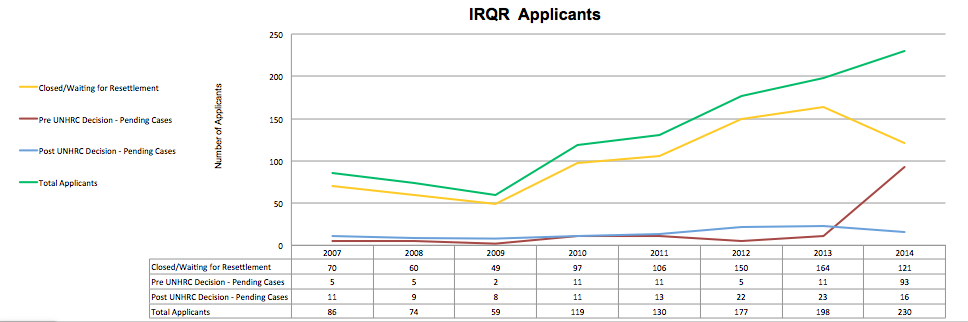
IRQR applicant statistics

Since December 2015, IRQR has directly worked with more than 1,900 LGBT refugees from Iran, Afghanistan, and Syria, assisting them with their UNHCR applications and their transition and settlement in Canada, the United States, and other countries. Most come from Iran, fleeing to Turkey; IRQR helps delay or completely avoid their deportation back to their home countries.

Asylum claims by LGBT individuals in Canada have a success rate of 70%, higher than the overall rate of 62%, although they face unique challenges due to the personal nature of their cases. IRQR reports an even higher success rate among its applicants, at 80%.

== See also ==
- LGBTQ rights in Iran
- Mullah Taha
