= Mehrdad Afsari =

Iranian photographer (born 1977)

- مهرداد افسری
- Born: September 21, 1977 (age 47); Khoy, Pahlavi Iran (now Iran)
- Education: University of Tehran, Tehran University of Art
- Occupation(s): Photographer, visual artist, film director, video artist, curator, educator
- Known for: Documentary film director

Mehrdad Afsari (Persian: مهرداد افسری; born 1977) is an Iranian photographer, film director, video artist, educator, curator, and visual artist. He is best known for his artistic and unusual landscapes with a conceptual and philosophical approach.

== Life and work ==
Mehrdad Afsari was born to Kurdish parents in 1977 in Khoy, Pahlavi Iran (now Iran). He received a B.A. degree in 2000 in photography from University of Tehran, and M.F.A in photography in 2006 from Tehran University of Art (now University of Art).

He has been professor at Tehran University of Art for 14 years. He is an honorary member of Iranian Visual Artists Society.

Since 2001, he has had 16 solo exhibitions in different galleries in Iran and his works have been shown in more than 80 exhibitions around the world such as Iran, China, Germany, US, UAE, Lithuania, Spain, Italy, Slovenia, Turkey, Georgia, France, Canada, Norway, UK such as Photo London 2018, Venice Biennial in Italy, Paris Photo in France, Contemporary Art Istanbul in Turkey, Queens Museum of Art (QMA) in USA, MAO Museum of Architecture and Design in Slovenia, The Reina Sofia Museum in Spain, Georgia Museum of Art, University of Westminster in London and Tehran museum of contemporary art (TMOCA).

He has also been the Jury member, lecturer and curator of many national and international festivals and exhibitions such as 11th Fajr visual arts Festival at Iranian Academy of the Arts.

Afsari curated the group exhibition Confined Landscape at Mohsen Gallery in Tehran in 2012 and the group exhibition Winter there in 2015. He also curated The Land of Bewilderment memoir exhibition of Mohammad Sayyad's photographs of Iraqi Kurd refugees, exhibited after some thirty years, which are replete with sorrow and bewilderment held in Nabshi Center.

== Awards and fellowships ==
- 2005: Third prize, 2nd Iranian Sea Photo Biennial, Iran
- 2006: First prize, 10th Photography Biennial, Tehran Museum of Contemporary Art, Tehran
- 2007: Second prize, 4th Iranian Sea Photo Biennial, Iran
- 2008: "Art Bridge Program", International Arts & Artists, Washington D.C, New York, Charleston, USA
- 2009: Grant winner at "1 sq. Mile Project", Visiting Arts, London
- 2016: Selected for "Iran and Norway Artist Exchange Program", Bergen, Norway

== Publications ==
=== Publications by Afsari ===
- The Gradual Disappearance of Things. Iran: Mohsen gallery, 2014. Edition of 1296 copies.

=== Publications with contributions by Afsari ===
- Eye 39: Mehrdad Afsari. Iran: Mahriz, 2010. Compiled by Iman Safaei. ISBN 978-964-94321-7-5. Persian and English text. Edition of 1500 copies.
- La Photographie Iranienne. Paris: Loco, 2011.
- Contemporary Iranian Art: New Perspective. London: Saqi, 2013. By Hamid Keshmirshekan. ISBN 978-0863567216.
