= LGBTQ rights in Zimbabwe =

- Zimbabwe
- Legal status: Male illegal since 1891 (as Rhodesia); Female illegal since 2006
- Penalty: Up to 1 year imprisonment with fines
- Gender identity: Gender change is not allowed.
- Military: No
- Discrimination protections: Only for personal data.

Family rights
- Recognition of relationships: No recognition of same-sex unions
- Restrictions: Same-sex marriage constitutionally banned since 2013
- Adoption: No

Lesbian, gay, bisexual, transgender, and queer (LGBTQ) people in Zimbabwe face legal challenges not experienced by non-LGBTQ residents. Since 1995, the Government of Zimbabwe has carried out campaigns against LGBTQ rights. Sodomy is classified as unlawful sexual conduct and defined in the Criminal Code as either anal sexual intercourse or any "indecent act" between consenting adults. Since 1995, the government has carried out campaigns against both homosexual men and women.

Zimbabwe stands in sharp contrast with neighbouring South Africa, Mozambique and Botswana, which enacted LGBTQ protections in the 20th and 21st centuries, along with Namibia, which decriminalized homosexuality in 2024 and recognized foreign same-sex relations starting in 2023. Same-sex marriage is banned by the Zimbabwe Constitution, and LGBTQ people enjoy no legal protections from discrimination, violence and harassment. Members of the LGBTQ community are heavily marginalised in both the legal and social spheres. As a result, many choose to remain in the closet, commit suicide, or emigrate, with a popular destination being South Africa due to their gay-friendly laws. However, since Robert Mugabe's forced removal from the presidency in November 2017, LGBTQ activists have expressed hopes that their human rights will be respected.

According to a 2018 survey, 50% of gay men in Zimbabwe had been physically assaulted and 64% had been disowned by their families. 27% of lesbians also reported disownment.

Homosexuality, same-sex relations and cross-dressing used to be accepted and commonplace in Zimbabwe prior to colonisation and post-independence anti-White government policies, which in turn has spread the erroneous belief that homosexuality is un-African or a Western phenomenon brought to the country. Homosexual activity has been documented among the San people, the Khoikhoi people, the Ndebele people and the Shona people.

== History of homosexuality in Zimbabwe in the pre colonial era ==
The San people, who have lived in Southern Africa for thousands of years, were known to engage in homosexual activity. One famous San rock painting, located near Guruve, depicts three men engaging in anal intercourse. It is estimated that the painting dates to roughly 8,000 BC, though some estimates instead state the painting to be about 2,000 years old. In the 18th century, the Khoikhoi people recognised the terms koetsire, which refers to a man who is sexually receptive to another man, and soregus, which refers to same-sex masturbation usually among friends. Anal intercourse and sexual relations between women also occurred, though more rarely. In these societies, homosexuality was not viewed as an antithesis to heterosexuality. Indeed, there was widespread liberty to move between the two, and engage in sexual activity with both men and women. The Bantu peoples are also known to have engaged in same-sex sexual activity. Before battle, Ndebele men would have sex with each other, typically intercrural sex. Effeminate men in Ndebele society would often become healers and spiritual leaders. Among both the Shona and Ndebele peoples, same-sex sexual activity was historically viewed as a form of spiritual rearmament (i.e. as a source of fresh power for their territories).

According to Marc Epprecht, homosexuality grew among African men during the colonial era. Even though it was controversial, arranges of pederasty began to show up in certain cities and labour camps in as early as 1907. The young men (called ngotshana in Shona, also known as boy-wife in English) would typically dress as women, perform chores associated with women, such as cooking and fetching water and firewood, and have intercrural sex with their older husbands. In addition, they were not allowed to grow beards or ejaculate. Upon reaching manhood, the relationship would be dissolved, and the boy-wife could take a ngotshana of his own if he so desired. These marriages are sometimes referred to as "mine marriages" as they were common among miners. Epprecht estimates that about 70% to 80% of Zimbabwean miners had an ngotshana. Other homosexual male relations during early colonial times included love affairs, prostitution, rape, and sexual brutality. Marc Epprecht stated that many Zimbabweans believed that homosexuality was un-African, caused by a disease introduced by white settlers from Europe. Epprecht's review of 250 court cases from 1892 to 1923 found cases from the beginnings of the records. The five 1892 cases all involved black Africans. A defence offered was that "sodomy" was part of local "custom". In one case, a chief was summoned to testify about customary penalties and reported that the penalty was a fine of one cow, which was less than the penalty for adultery. Over the entire period, Epprecht found the balance of black and white defendants proportional to that in the population. He noted, however, only what came to the attention of the courts - most consensual relations in private did not necessarily provoke notice. Some cases were brought by partners who had been dropped or who had not received promised compensation from their former sexual partner. And although the norm was for the younger male to lie supine and not show any enjoyment, let alone expect any sexual mutuality, Epprecht found a case in which a pair of black males had stopped their sexual relationship out of fear of pregnancy, but one wanted to resume taking turns penetrating each other.

Writing in the 19th century about the area of today's southwestern Zimbabwe, David Livingstone asserted that the monopolization of women by elderly chiefs was essentially responsible for the "immorality" practised by younger men. Edwin W. Smith and A. Murray Dale mentioned one Ila-speaking man who dressed as a woman, did women's work, lived and slept among, but not with, women. The Ila labelled such individuals mwaami, translated as "prophet". They also mentioned that pederasty was not rare, "but was considered dangerous because of the risk that the boy will become pregnant".

== Law regarding same-sex sexual activity ==
Laws against same-sex sexual activity date back to 1891, when the British South Africa Company imposed the law used at the Cape of Good Hope on the region. Common law prohibitions include sodomy, defined as the "unlawful and intentional sexual relations per anum between two human males" as well as unnatural offences, defined as the unlawful and intentional commission of an unnatural sexual act by one person with another person. Section 11 of the Censorship and Entertainments Control Act, which provides that no person shall import, print, publish, distribute, or keep for sale any publication which is undesirable (defined as "indecent or obscene or is offensive or harmful to public morals or is likely to be contrary to public health") has been used to harass LGBTQ people and activists.

In 1996, former President Canaan Banana was arrested based on accusations made during the murder trial of his former bodyguard, Jefta Dube, and found guilty of eleven charges of sodomy, attempted sodomy and indecent assault in 1998. He was sentenced to 10 years in prison, defrocked, and served 6 months in an open prison.

Laws passed in 2006 criminalized any actions perceived as homosexual. The Zimbabwean Government has made it a criminal offense for two people of the same sex to hold hands, hug, or kiss. The "sexual deviancy" law was one of 15 additions to Zimbabwe's Criminal Code quietly passed in Parliament. The sections involving gays and lesbians are part of an overhaul of the country's sodomy laws. Before then, laws against sodomy were limited to sexual activity, and the revised law now states that sodomy is any "act involving contact between two males that would be regarded by a reasonable person as an indecent act".

== Recognition of same-sex relationships ==
Zimbabwe does not recognise same-sex marriage or civil unions. In 2013, the Zimbabwe Constitution was amended to define marriage as being between a man and a woman.

In May 2019, Mnangagwa's Cabinet approved amendments to Zimbabwean marriage law, which would ban both child marriages and same-sex marriages, lining it with the Constitution.

== Discrimination protections ==
The Freedom of Information Act (2020) and the Cyber and Data Protection Act (2022) offer explicit protection based on sexual orientation regarding personal information.

== Gender identity and expression ==
Gender marker change is not allowed. Section 18(2) of the Births and Deaths Registration Act allows for a change of first name by submitting an application to the Registrar General, providing evidence justifying the need for the change. The discretion granted to the Registrar General to approve name changes may prevent a name change based on gender identity. Activists such as Jordan Chanetsa have commented on the difficulty for transgender people to access legal work due to their gender not being reflected in their official documents.

== Intersex rights ==
Zimbabwe does not ban medical interventions performed on intersex infants. Article 52 on Right to personal security of the Constitution of Zimbabwe, states that "Every person has the right to bodily and psychological integrity, which includes the right: a) to freedom from all forms of violence from public or private sources; b)subject to any other provision of this Constitution, to make decisions concerning reproduction; c) not to be subjected to medical or scientific experiments, or to the extraction or use of their bodily tissue, without their informed consent."

In July 2025, the government launched a legal reform process aimed at recognizing and protecting the rights of intersex people.

== Politics ==
=== Mugabe Administration ===
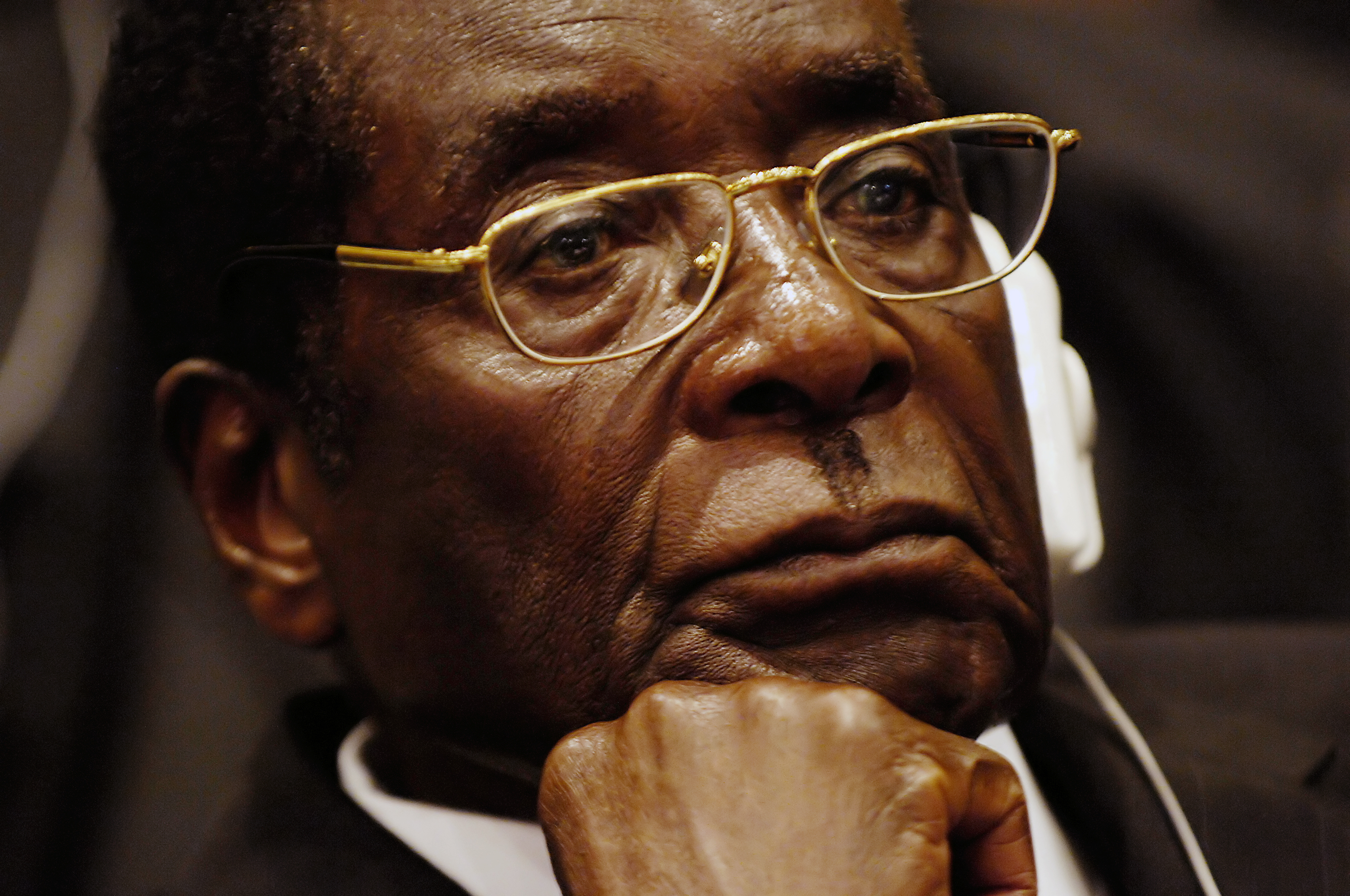
Robert Mugabe at an African Union summit in 2008

President of Zimbabwe Robert Mugabe, from 1980 to 2017, actively discriminated against LGBTQ people and spoke out in public against homosexuality.

Mugabe received worldwide criticism for comments he made on 1 August 1995 after coming across a stall set up by the organisation Gays and Lesbians of Zimbabwe (GALZ) at the country's annual International Book Fair in Harare, founded in 1990 to facilitate communication within the LGBTQ community and which had not received much attention from the Government beforehand.

Mugabe's comments after seeing the stall at the book fair were:

I find it extremely outrageous and repugnant to my human conscience that such immoral and repulsive organizations, like those of homosexuals, who offend both against the law of nature and the cultural norms espoused by our society, should have any advocates in our midst and elsewhere in the world.

Two weeks later, during Zimbabwe's annual independence celebrations, Mugabe proclaimed:

It degrades human dignity. It's unnatural, and there is no question ever of allowing these people to behave worse than dogs and pigs. If dogs and pigs do not do it, why must human beings? We have our own culture, and we must re-dedicate ourselves to our traditional values that make us human beings. ... What we are being persuaded to accept is sub-animal behavior and we will never allow it here. If you see people parading themselves as Lesbians and Gays, arrest them and hand them over to the police!

Since then, President Mugabe increased the political repression of homosexuals under Zimbabwe's sodomy laws. Mugabe blamed gays for many of Zimbabwe's problems and views homosexuality as an "un-African" and immoral culture brought by colonists and practiced by only "a few whites" in his country. During his 82nd birthday celebrations, Mugabe told supporters to "leave whites to do that". Mugabe instructed journalists, most of whom work for state-owned institutions, to report unfavorably about gay relationships. Some critics believed that Mugabe was using gays as a scapegoat to deflect attention from Zimbabwe's major economic problems.

GALZ has been the target of infiltration by government spies and extortion attempts by both strangers and casual acquaintances. LGBTQ people have been repeatedly bribed, detained, killed, beaten and sometimes raped by the authorities. The Central Intelligence Organisation has reportedly been used to beat and arrest homosexuals.

In 1999, British gay rights activists, led by Peter Tatchell, attempted a citizen's arrest of Mugabe for the crime of torture. In 2001, Tatchell again tried to arrest the President in Brussels but was beaten unconscious by Mugabe's security guards.

Mugabe also compared gays and lesbians as "worse than pigs and dogs". In 2015, he stood before the United Nations General Assembly and declared "we [Zimbabweans] are not gay". Mugabe was ousted as president in November 2017.

=== Mnangagwa Administration ===
After Robert Mugabe's forced removal from the presidency in November 2017, Emmerson Mnangagwa was declared President of Zimbabwe. There are hopes that Mnangagwa would reverse Zimbabwe's decades-long persecution of LGBTQ people, led by the virulently homophobic former President Mugabe.

In January 2018, Mnangagwa spoke on the issue of LGBTQ rights for the first time, saying: "Those people who want it [same-sex marriage] are the people who should canvass for it, but it's not my duty to campaign for this". In June, the Zimbabwe African National Union – Patriotic Front (ZANU-PF), the ruling political party, met with LGBTQ activists to discuss the situation of LGBTQ rights in Zimbabwe and to "improve the lives of LGBTQ people through local governance". Chester Samba, director of GALZ, said: "As an initial meeting it was great that they responded positively and somewhat surprising as this marked a departure from the previous leadership which did not engage with us. A willingness to engage is indeed an important shift."

In July, the Health Ministry adopted new training manuals to be used by health professionals when dealing with gays and sex workers. The manuals read: "The programme is to educate and equip healthcare providers in Zimbabwe with the knowledge and skills to enable them to provide health services that support and adequately cater for the unique healthcare needs of sex workers, men who have sex with men, transgender and non-gender conforming people and people who inject and use drugs. The fact that sex work, drug use and some sexual acts are considered illegal in Zimbabwe can create a variety of situations that negatively affect members of key populations more than the general populations. This undermines HIV prevention for the whole nation by affecting these individuals' access to healthcare". That same month, it was announced that five new health centres would open in Harare, Bulawayo, Gweru, Mutare and Kwekwe to cater to the health needs of gay and bisexual men.

The July elections were welcomed by LGBTQ activists, who called them a "historic win": "We witnessed a reduction in homophobic hate speech and reduction in the politicisation of LGBTQ individuals as campaign tools."

== Living conditions ==
Homosexuality is highly taboo in the socially conservative country and Mugabe's anti-gay stance resonates with many Zimbabweans. Gays and lesbians in Zimbabwe are threatened by violence and suicide attempts are common among the gay community. A few nightclubs in urban areas such as Harare and Bulawayo are tolerant of gay customers, however. Gay prostitution is known to be solicited in some Harare clubs.

In September 2018, a teacher at the St. John's College in Harare came out as gay to his students, reportedly to their cheers, following reports of a homophobic climate for gay students. The school later affirmed its commitment to providing a safe and caring environment for "all persons, regardless of race, religious beliefs, gender, sexual orientation, abilities or disabilities or any other real or perceived difference". The teacher resigned the following week because of death threats from parents.

=== 2002 asylum attempt ===
In 1998, William Kimumwe, a gay man facing sodomy charges, fled Zimbabwe for Kenya. In 2002, he arrived in the United States seeking asylum, which was denied by an immigration judge. In 2005, the U.S. Court of Appeals for the Eighth Circuit in the state of Missouri upheld the immigration judge's decision. A two-judge majority believed Kimumwe's experiences in Zimbabwe were the result of his actions, not his sexual orientation. Stating that Kimumwe was not being persecuted for being a homosexual but was being persecuted for being a criminal since homosexuality was illegal and thus was ineligible for asylum.

=== Religious leaders ===
The Anglican Bishop of Harare, Peter Hatendi, was a vocal opponent of gay rights while leader of the Church in the 1980s and 90s, arguing that homosexuality is a sin and non-celibate gay people could never be accepted into the church.

His successor as bishop, Nolbert Kunonga, accused Archbishop of Canterbury Rowan Williams of "heresy", and suggested he was "coming to lobby for homosexuality".

=== HIV/AIDS ===
HIV/AIDS has plagued the population of Zimbabwe; the country has one of the highest prevalence rates in the world as approximately 13.50% of adults aged 15–49 have been infected with the virus. Furthermore, many cannot afford or do not have access to antiretroviral drugs, commonly referred to as ARVs. At present, GALZ is one of the few lobby groups in Zimbabwe with an active AIDS treatment plan. The association intends to have all its registered members take an HIV test. It also distributes posters warning people about the ways in which gays are vulnerable to AIDS. UNICEF has also been working to curb the reach of HIV transmissions from mothers to children, specifically among young girls. In 2016, 98% of HIV-exposed newborns received ARVs to prevent the spread of HIV from mother to child, up from 78% in the previous year. Unicef hopes that their efforts will lead to the eradication of mother-to-child transmissions of HIV by 2021.

=== Activism and advocacy groups ===
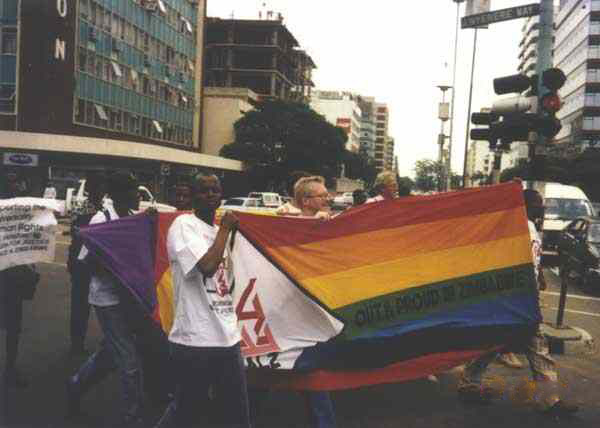
Gays and Lesbians of Zimbabwe marching in Harare in 1998

Gays and Lesbians of Zimbabwe (GALZ) is a prominent LGBTQ rights group that was formed in 1990. After Zimbabwean independence was gained on 18 April 1980, there was a flourishing gay scene in urban areas. Many believed that a group with more serious aims for the LGBTQ community should be established, and meetings began taking place in the late 1980s, with GALZ being officially established in September 1990. One of the main goals of GALZ is to assist people with HIV/AIDS. Initially being separated from the cause of the HIV/AIDS community of Zimbabwe, GALZ is now one of the largest proponents for rights of those afflicted and their health.

Rikki Nathanson set up Trans Research, Education, Advocacy & Training (TREAT) in 2015. In 2014, she had been arrested for using a women's bathroom under the charge of criminal nuisance. After the charge was thrown out, Nathanson sued for damages and won her case.

== Summary table ==
| Same-sex sexual activity legal | No (Penalty: Up to 1 year imprisonment with fines) |
| Equal age of consent | No |
| Anti-discrimination laws in employment only | No |
| Anti-discrimination laws in the provision of goods and services | No |
| Anti-discrimination laws in all other areas (Incl. indirect discrimination, hate speech) | No / Yes Personal info/data only. |
| Same-sex marriages | No (Constitutional ban since 2013) |
| Stepchild adoption by same-sex couples | No |
| Joint adoption by same-sex couples | No |
| LGBTQ people allowed to serve openly in the military | No |
| Right to change legal gender | No |
| Access to IVF for lesbians | No |
| Commercial surrogacy for gay male couples | No |
| Conversion therapy made illegal | No |
| MSMs allowed to donate blood | No |

== See also ==
- Human rights in Zimbabwe
- LGBTQ rights in Africa
- Forbidden Fruit, a documentary about lesbians in Zimbabwe
