= Lepa Mlađenović =

Serbian feminist (born 1954)

Lepa Mlađenović Лепа Млађеновић
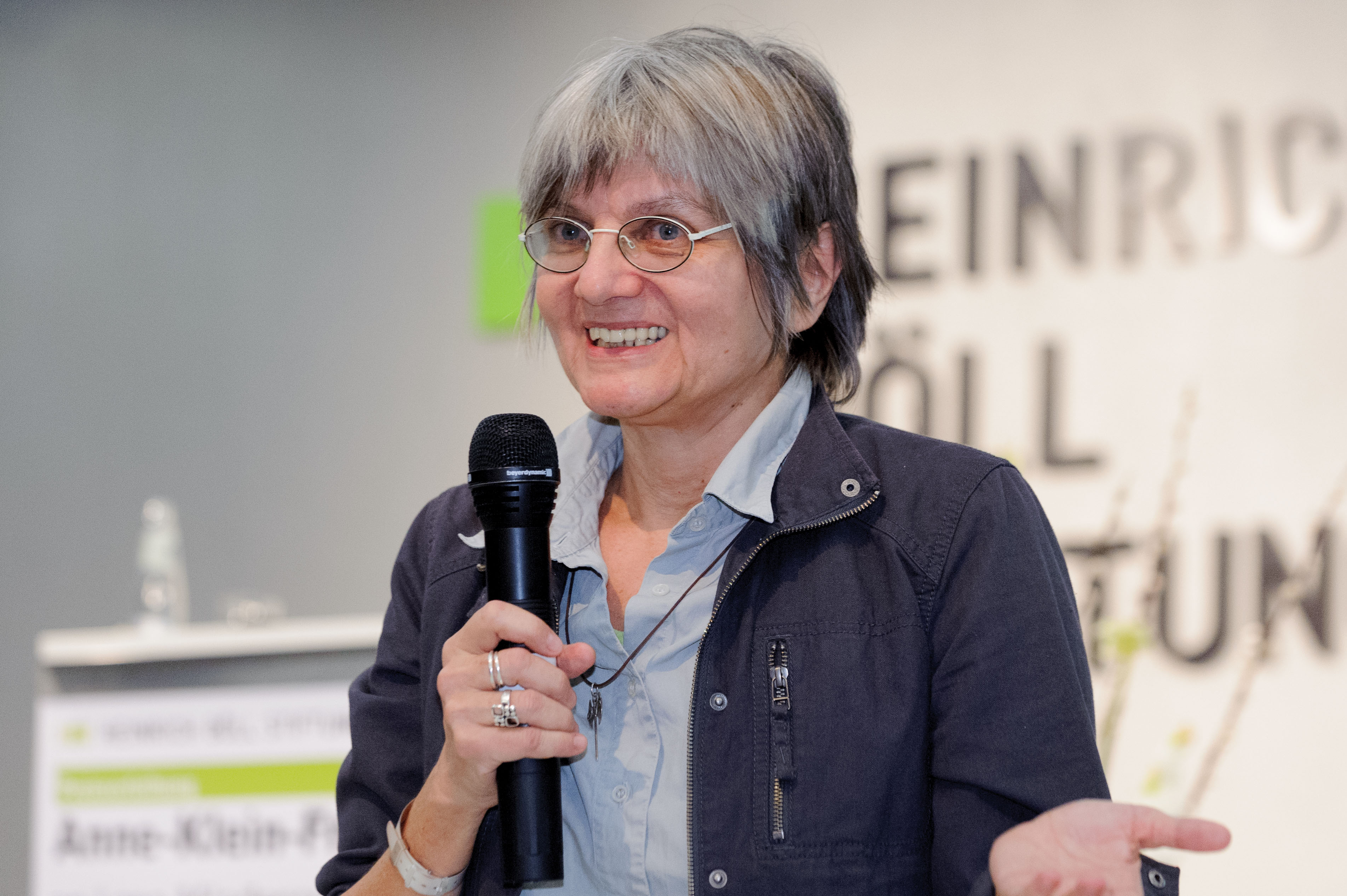
- Mlađenović in 2013
- Born: Lepa Mlađenović; November 9, 1954 (age 71); Belgrade, Yugoslavia
- Occupations: LGBTQ activist; anti-war activist; feminist; counselor; facilitator

Lepa Mlađenović (Serbo-Croatian Cyrillic: Лепа Млађеновић; born November 9, 1954) is a Serbian feminist, lesbian, anti-war activist who is a pioneer of second-wave feminism in Yugoslavia. She is a feminist counselor for women survivors of male violence or lesbophobia, a workshop facilitator, a writer and lecturer and a member of several international boards and networks which are concerned about lesbian rights and violence against women. Mlađenović is considered a symbol of women's activism in the former Yugoslavia. Born in Belgrade, she spent her childhood summer holidays in Sarajevo and at the Adriatic Sea. As of 2017, Mlađenović lives in Belgrade.

== Human-rights work ==
=== Alternatives to Psychiatry ===
Mlađenović graduated from the Department of Psychology Studies at the University of Belgrade Faculty of Philosophy in 1980. As a student, she opposed the rigid educational system by writing protest letters to professors criticizing conservative rules which do not empower students. The first social movement in which Mlađenović actively participated was the Network for Alternatives to Psychiatry, whose goal was to de-institutionalize psychiatry because of its violence and exclusion. Mlađenović initiated and co-organised "Psychiatry and Society", a three-day 1983 international conference at the student cultural center in Belgrade. She then volunteered at mental health centers in Trieste, and wrote about Democratic Psychiatry in Italy and the Arbours Association community-therapy centers in London which developed from the anti-psychiatry movement.

=== Feminist and anti-war activism ===
Mlađenović's feminist activism began in 1978 when she participated in DRUG-ca Žena (Comrade Women), the first international women's conference organized by Yugoslav feminists at the student cultural center in Belgrade, which was a turning point for feminist and civil society in the former Yugoslavia. In 1982, Mlađenović co-organized the feminist group Women and Society in Belgrade. Four years later, she organized an all-women feminist group as part of Women and Society which was based on a self-awareness model.

Mlađenović participated in the first Yugoslav feminist meeting in Ljubljana in 1987, which was organized by the LILIT feminist group and LILIT LL lesbian group from Slovenia. The meeting encouraged sisterhood, exchanges, support for women's activism, discussions of violence against women, women's reproductive health, women's art and culture, and the first initiatives for lesbian organizing. With other Women and Society activists, Mlađenović co-founded the SOS Hotline for Women and Children Victims of Violence in Belgrade in 1990 and was a coordinator and counselor for women survivors of male violence. She later worked with women victims of war.

In 1991, Mlađenović joined Stanislava Staša Zajović and several other feminist anti-war activists to found Women in Black. The group began with weekly vigils protesting the Serbian regime, and later became part of the worldwide Women in Black network. Women in Black of Belgrade held its first meeting on October 9, 1991.

Mlađenović was an educator and counselor from 1992 to 2012, working with women victims of male violence in Bosnia and Herzegovina, Croatia and Hungary. In 1993, Mlađenović and other feminist SOS Hotline volunteers founded Autonomni Ženski Centar AŽC (the Autonomous Women's Center); she was a psychological counselor and coordinator of the center's counseling team until 2011. Mlađenović has participated in (and facilitated) many workshops for women and support groups for women victims of male violence from 2000 to the present, and facilitates emotional-literacy workshops for activists (particularly lesbians) in the Balkans. She works in Italy with the Donne in Rete contro la violenza NGO, and published a paper about feminist counseling for sexual violence.

=== Lesbian activism ===
Mlađenović and Suzana Tratnik were participants from Yugoslavia at the 1986 International Lesbian Information Service conference in Geneva. She, Dejan Nebrigić and several other activists founded Arkadija, Belgrade's first gay and lesbian organization, in 1990; the group operated until 1997. Mlađenović was the first lesbian in Serbia to come out during a public television broadcast (in 1994); she discussed gay and lesbian issues and represented the Arkadija group. She and several other activists from Arkadija formed Labris, the first lesbian organization, the following year. In 2001, Mlađenović described the experience:

I would write a solidarity letter with a package to an unknown woman in Sarajevo, knowing she is under the siege and bullets daily, and worry would she be embarrassed one day when she sees a lesbian in front of her door who wrote her letters? Why was it always so difficult to say that certain humanitarian aid came from lesbians?

As part of Labris, Mlađenović was an organizer of and participant in the first Lesbian Week in Slovenia in 1997 (organized by the Slovenian feminist lesbian group Kasandra). Forty-five people participated from Novi Sad, Maribor, Skopje, Belgrade, Zagreb, Pristina, Split and Ljubljana, and the event introduced regional feminist cooperation. The second Lesbian Week was held in Sombor in 2000, and the third (both organized by Labris) took place in Novi Sad in 2004. and the fourth Lesbian Week was organised in 2011.

Mlađenović was a co-organizer of the 2001 Belgrade Pride. She and several other lesbian counselors founded the Counseling SOS line for Lesbians in 2012, where she was a workshop facilitator and psychological counselor as of 2017.

== Recognition ==
Mlađenović received the Felipa de Souza Award, awarded by OutRight Action International, for her contribution to LGBT human-rights activism in 1994 at a Pride celebration in New York. When she received the award, she said: "The place I come from is not the nation where I was born, but a lost lesbian country that I never had – but I will manage to create it, somehow."

The Novi Sad Lesbian Organisation (NLO) honored Mlađenović in 2011 by opening a lesbian, feminist, radical anti-fascist reading room named for her. She received the 2013 Anne Klein Women's Award, presented by the Heinrich Boell Foundation. Mlađenović brought 22 lesbian activists from the region to the award ceremony in Berlin as part of a lesbian study visit.

== Publications ==
From 1992 to 2012, Mlađenović was a member of and lecturer at the Center for Women's Studies in Belgrade. She has written several essays on war rape, violence against women, lesbian rights, lesbians in wartime, femicide, the feminist approach to transitional justice, women's solidarity and emotional literacy. In her manifesto, "Politics of Women’s Solidarity", she says:

Women’s solidarity is a beginning of defascisation of each of us. Because we choose understanding and not accusation, we choose empathy and not hate. We choose to be responsible for our acts, emotions and thoughts, instead of taking a role of a victim. Women’s solidarity is a politics of anti-fascism. Because we choose to care about the Other, the different then me. When we watch children with eyes of solidarity then our children are not necessarily better nor more beautiful then those of others.
