= Pride Month =

Monthlong observance celebrating LGBTQIA+ culture

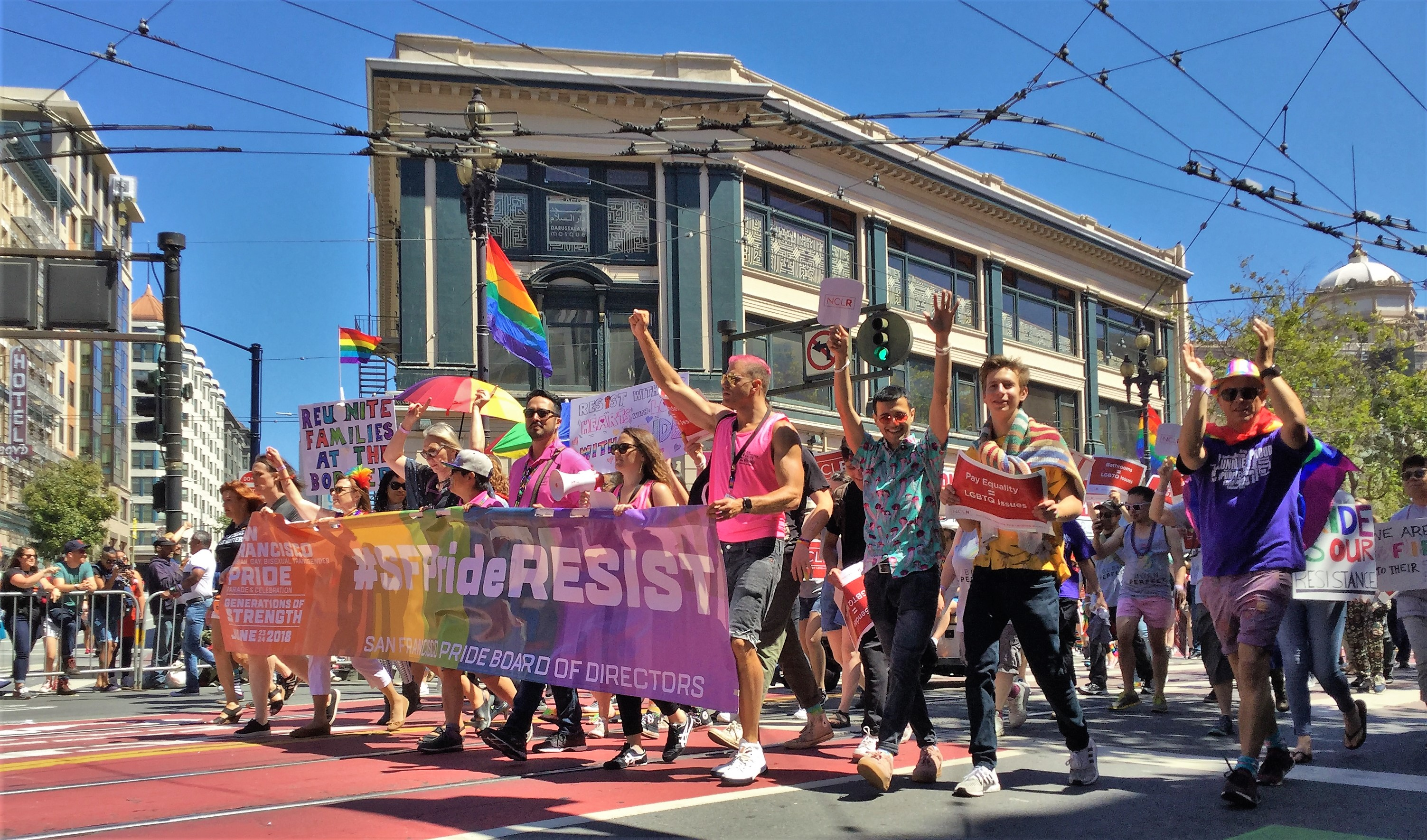
- A 2018 pride parade in San Francisco, California
- Type: Cultural
- Observances: Celebration of LGBTQ pride, rights, and culture
- Date: June (US, Canada, France, Ireland, Israel); Various (New Zealand)
- Duration: 1 month
- Frequency: Annual

Pride Month, sometimes specified as LGBTQIA+ Pride Month, is a month-long observance dedicated to the celebration of LGBTQ pride, commemorating the contributions of lesbian, gay, bisexual, transgender and queer (LGBTQ) culture and community. In the United States, Pride Month is observed in June, coinciding with the anniversary of the 1969 Stonewall riots, a series of gay liberation protests.

== History in the United States ==
=== Origins ===
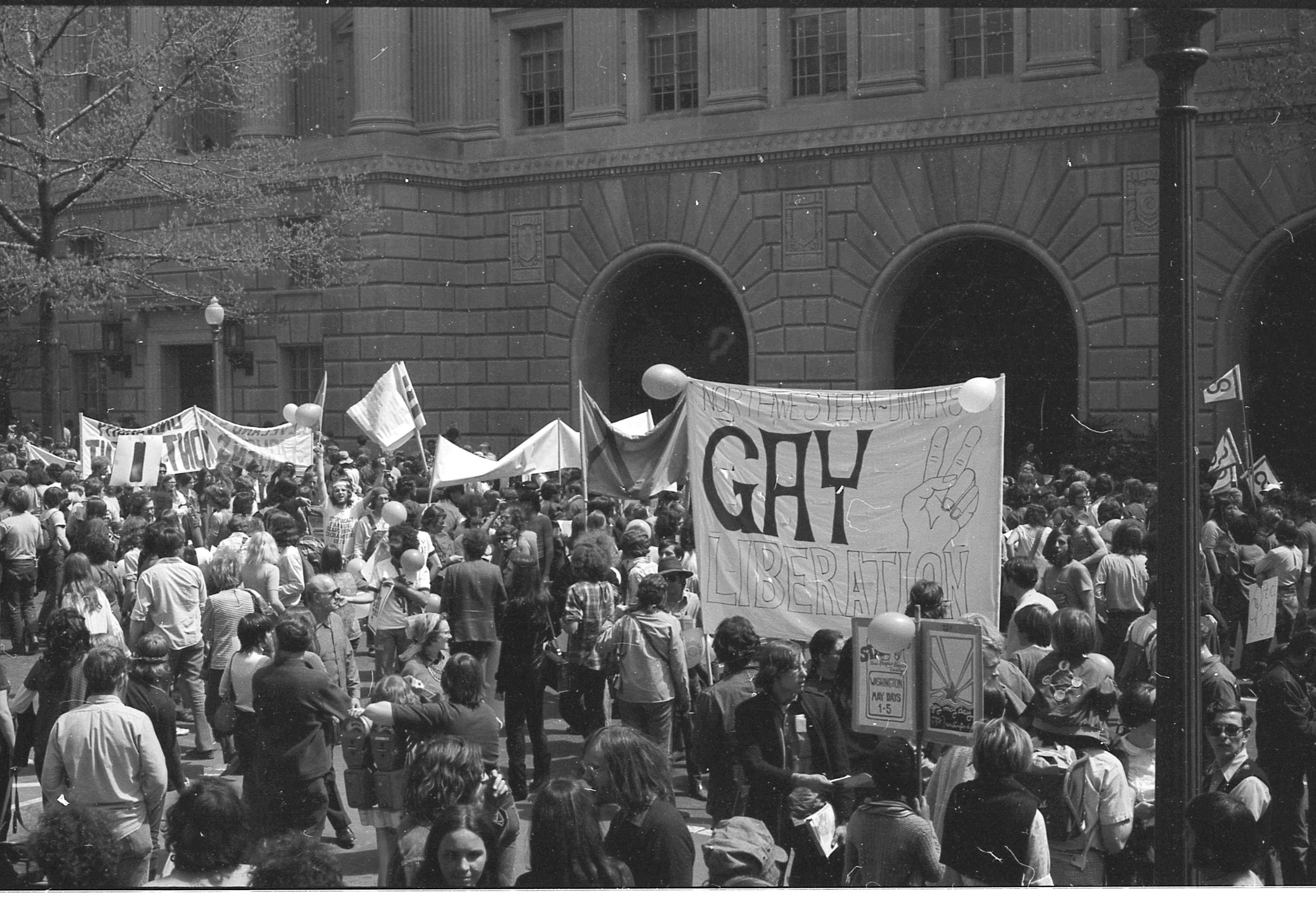
A 1970s gay liberation protest in Washington, D.C.

The first pride marches were held in four US cities in June 1970, one year after the riots at the Stonewall Inn. The New York City march, promoted as "Christopher Street Liberation Day", alongside the parallel marches in Chicago, Los Angeles, and San Francisco, marked a watershed moment for LGBTQ rights. An organizer of some of the first marches named Fred Sargeant stated the goal was to commemorate the Stonewall riots and further push for liberation. He noted that while the first marches were more akin to a protest than a celebration, they helped to remind people of LGBTQ communities and how they may include one's family and friends. Transgender women and people of color, including Marsha P. Johnson, Sylvia Rivera, and Stormé DeLarverie, were largely excluded or silenced during the early marches, despite their prominent participation in the initial riots.

=== Spread and celebration ===
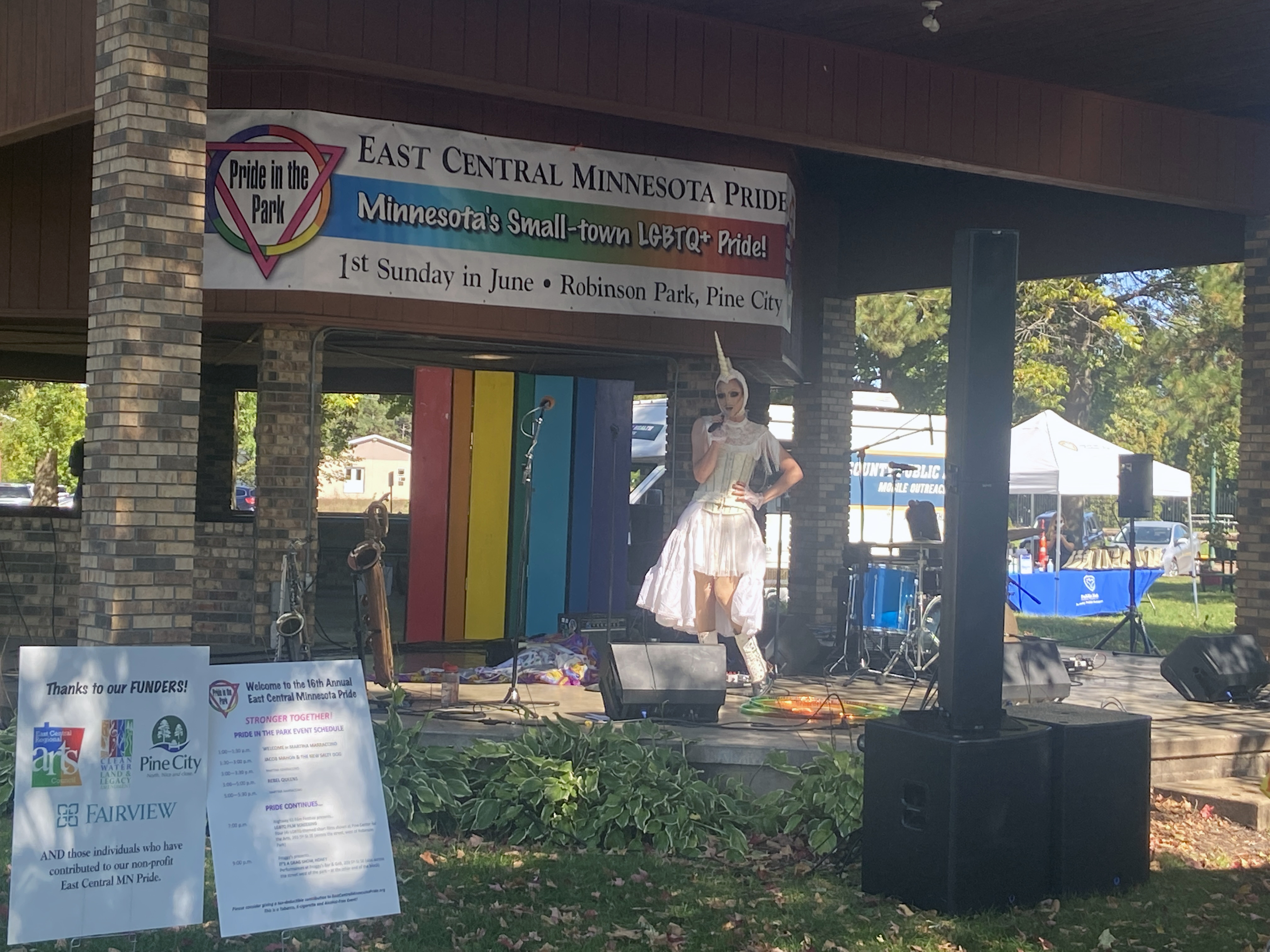
Rural communities such as Pine City, Minnesota are increasingly celebrating Pride Month.

Following the Stonewall riots and the first pride marches, the number of LGBTQ groups rapidly increased, and the pride movement spread across the United States after a few years. While many Pride celebrations around the world are held in June, some cities vary the observation at different times, partially due to local weather conditions.

Polyamory Pride Day is celebrated every year on a day in Pride Month.

=== Recognition ===
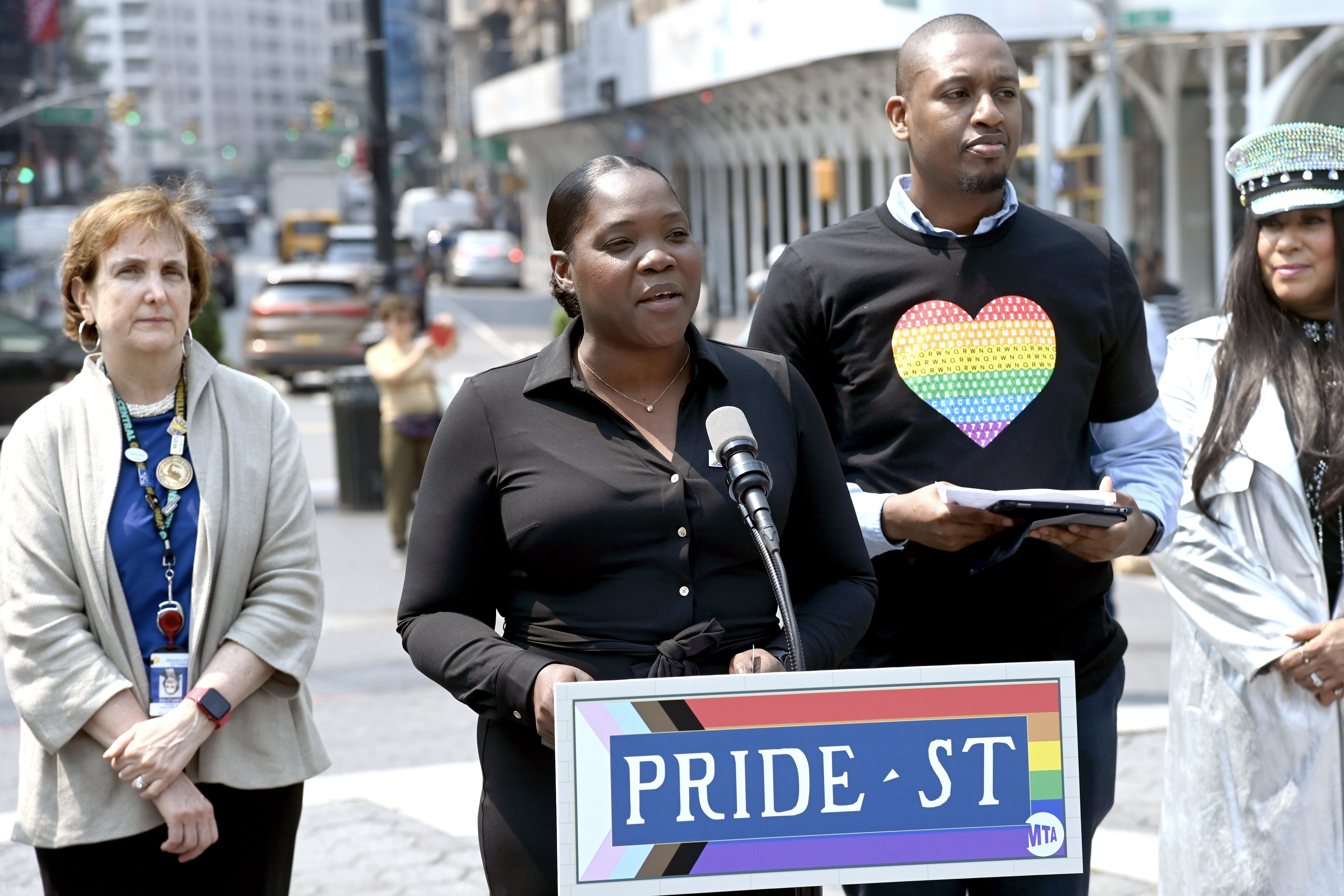
New York City's Metropolitan Transportation Authority recognizes Pride Month annually.

June became recognized as Pride Month in the United States to commemorate the Stonewall Uprising. President Bill Clinton officially declared in a presidential proclamation that June would be "Gay and Lesbian Pride Month" in 1999. Barack Obama expanded the official Pride Month recognition in 2011, including the whole of the LGBT community. Donald Trump declined to offer federal recognition of Pride Month in 2017, though he issued supportive public statements in a series of Tweets in 2019. Joe Biden recognized Pride Month after taking office in 2021, and vowed to push for LGBT rights in the United States, despite previously voting against same-sex marriage and school education of LGBTQ topics in the Senate. Pride Month has since grown into a global celebration of LGBTQ+ culture and identity.

Pride Month is often observed by several LGBTQ-affirming religious groups.

In February 2025, Google announced that Pride Month would no longer be highlighted by default on Google Calendar, arguing that it was no longer "scalable or sustainable" to continue adding the growing number of national and international "cultural moments" manually to its calendars.

== In other countries ==
=== Canada ===
In Canada, Pride Month is celebrated in June as part of the Pride Season, which happens from June to September. Other events in Pride Season include Public Service Pride Week, which is celebrated in the third week of August. Many communities in Canada celebrate pride in July or August, reflecting important dates in the Canadian history of pride protests and celebrations. In Ottawa, the annual pride parade occurs in the last week of August, marking the 1971 We Demand Rally, while in Vancouver, pride events including the Vancouver Pride Parade occur in the first week of August, to mark the first Vancouver pride protest organized by the Gay Alliance Toward Equality on August 1, 1973.

=== France ===
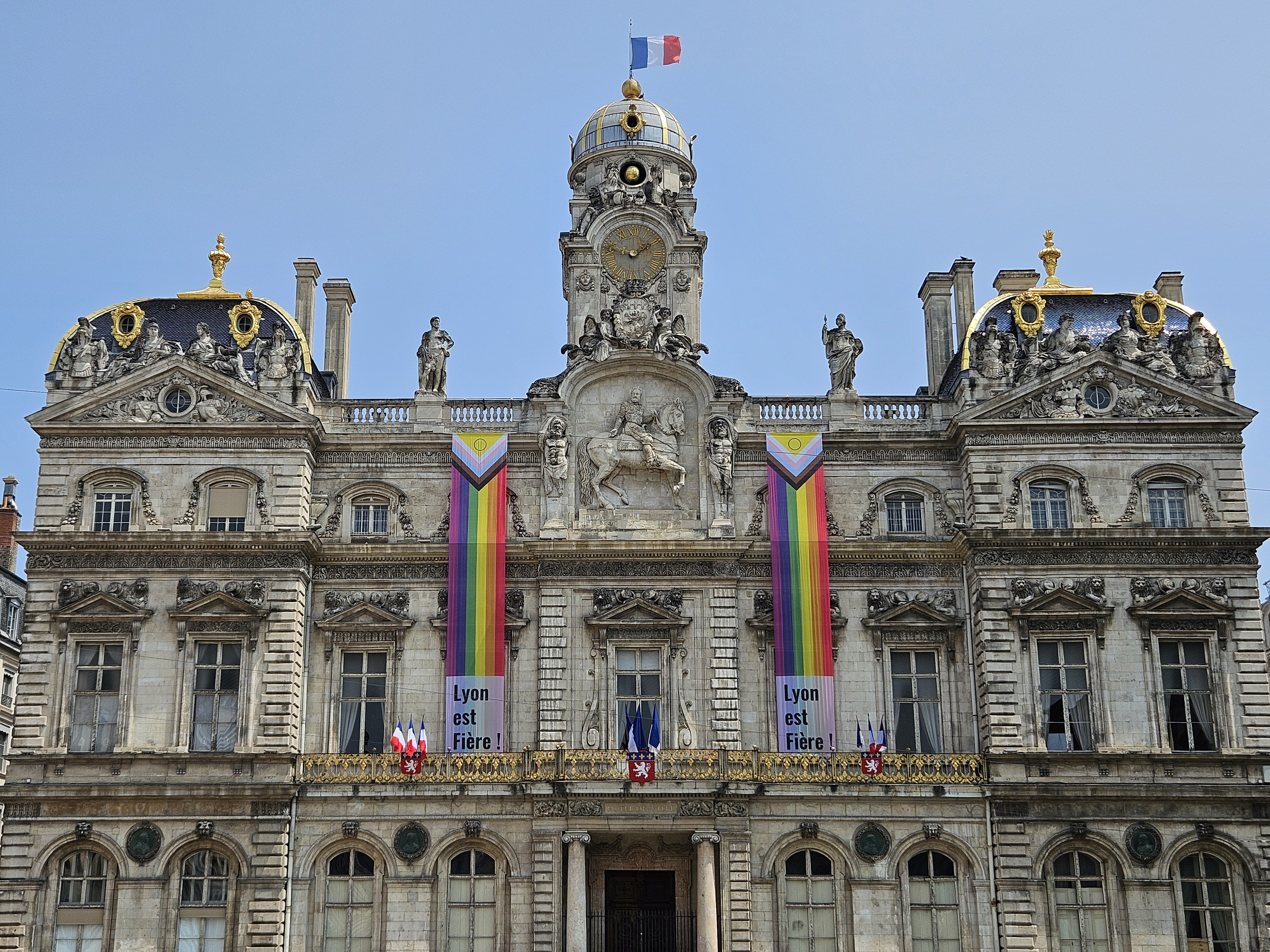
View of Hôtel de Ville, Lyon, France during Pride Month in May-June 2025.

In France, Pride month, known as mois des fiertés is celebrated in major cities like Paris and Lyon in the month of June.

=== Ireland ===
Pride Month is celebrated during June in Ireland.

=== Israel ===
In Israel, Pride Month is observed annually in June with public events in several cities, namely the Tel Aviv Pride parade.

=== New Zealand ===
Pride month is celebrated at different times throughout New Zealand. In Auckland, it is celebrated in February,, in Christchurch and Wellington Pride Month is in March. Rotorua in Matariki, and for Hamilton and Tauranga it is held in April.

== International LGBTQ Pride Day ==
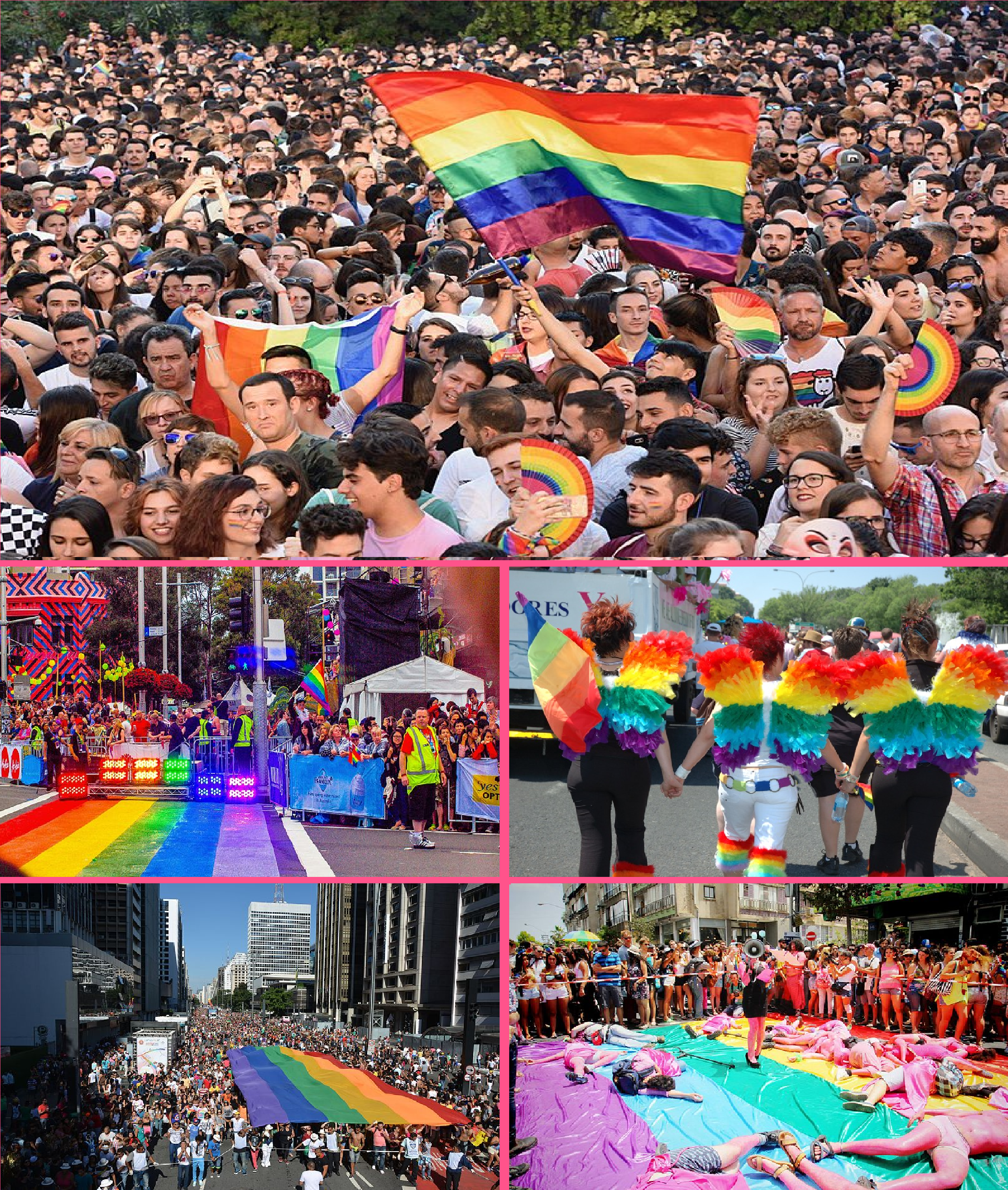
2019 Pride celebrations in Spain, Australia, South Africa, Brazil and Israel

International LGBTQ Pride Day is a day dedicated to LGBTQ pride, held on June 28 to commemorate the anniversary of the Stonewall riots, prior to the entire month becoming associated with LGBTQ Pride.

The San Francisco Pride march was promoted as the International Lesbian & Gay Freedom Day Parade from 1981 to 1994, likely the origin of an international pride day.

Serbian group Arkadija commemorated International Pride Day in 1991 with a forum concerning queer activism and art at Belgrade Youth Center. Nicaragua's first public pride festival was also held on this day 1991 to commemorate the Stonewall Riots. Serbia also marked International Pride Day in between 2013 and 2015 with Hate-Free Zone actions, organized by GSA, Women in Black and other NGOs.

== Criticism ==
Some have criticized how many companies release Pride Month-themed products, likening it to the concept of slacktivism, as the companies are perceived to be using the topic of LGBTQ rights as a means of profit, without contributing to the movement in a meaningful way or even while financing the campaigns of homophobic politicians. Others have criticized the seemingly hypocritical nature of companies making social media profiles evoke the rainbow pride flag while refusing to alter the profile pictures in areas without broad LGBTQ acceptance.

Some religious and cultural groups oppose Pride Month on ideological grounds. They view LGBTQ+ identities and relationships as contrary to their beliefs and traditions. These objections often lead to tensions and conflicts during Pride Month.

== See also ==
- LGBTQ culture
- LGBTQ movements
- LGBTQ tourism
- List of LGBTQ rights activists
- Pride (LGBTQ culture)
- LGBTQ history
- LGBTQ people
