= Tiripano =

Tiripano is a surname. Notable people with the surname include:

- Chipo Mugeri-Tiripano (born 1992), Zimbabwean cricketer
- Donald Tiripano (born 1988), Zimbabwean cricketer
- Tsitsi Tiripano (1967–2001), Zimbabwean lesbian activist
