= Dejan Nebrigić =

Serbian gay and anti-war activist

Dejan Nebrigić Дејан Небригић
- Born: 29 December 1970; Pančevo, SFR Yugoslavia
- Died: 29 December 1999 (aged 29); Pančevo, FR Yugoslavia
- Cause of death: Murder
- Resting place: Catholic Cemetery, Pančevo
- Occupations: LGBTQ activist; anti-war activist; writer; theatre critic
- Writing career
- Years active: 1990–1999
- Notable work: Lavirintski rečnik: Paris-New York

Dejan Nebrigić (Serbo-Croatian Cyrillic: Дејан Небригић; 29 December 1970 – 29 December 1999) was a Serbian gay and anti-war activist, writer and theatre critic. He was known as the initiator of the first trial of homophobic discrimination in Serbia. He was one of the founders of the LGBT movement in Serbia.

== Activism ==
Together with Lepa Mlađenović and another ten signatories, Nebrigić participated in the founding of Arkadija, the first LGBT organization in Serbia in 1990. The following year Nebrigić was one of the founders and co-editors of the anti-war magazine Pacifik, where he wrote on gay and lesbian themes. Nebrigić was active in the Centre for Antiwar Action which was also founded in 1991.

Nebrigić was also a member of the Women in Black organization. He was released from serving in the army, as he informed the recruiting committee that he was homosexual. He was the first anti-war activist to speak publicly about his sexuality in the media.

In 1997 in the Novi Sad newspaper Nebrigić published a gay themed Paris-New York travelogue. The following year he published the para-philosophical Lavirintski rečnik (Labyrinth Dictionary). He also published works in journals such as Uznet, KulturTreger and ProFemina.

In 1998–1999, Nebrigić was the CEO of the Campaign Against Homophobia (which was financially supported by the Humanitarian Law Center and the European Youth Association). During this period he compiled and edited four booklet size reports documenting homophobia in Serbian public arena -- in the media, by politicians, incidents of attacks etc (25 to 40 pages each).

== Lawsuit and Murder ==
In April 1999 Nebrigić filed a lawsuit against Vlastimir Lazarov, for repeatedly calling and harassing him and threatening his security. Lazarov was the father of Milan Lazar, Nebrigić's ex-boyfriend, who blamed Nebrigić for the fact that his son was gay. Nebrigić informed the police multiple times but was beaten and insulted by police officers in an official car. The Duty Attorney subsequently refused to represent Nebrigić because "he doesn't want to talk with fags". The hearing was scheduled for November 1999 but was delayed due to a judge's illness.

On the night of 29 December 1999, on his 29th birthday, Dejan Nebrigić was murdered in his apartment in Pančevo. The investigation found that he had been killed by Milan Lazarov.

Activists alleged that the Serbian government, who had been hostile to dissident movements and the gay civil rights lobby, used Nebrigić's murder as anti gay rights and anti-Western propaganda. In an interview with the Serb pro-government tabloid Politika Express, Reuters reported that Nedeljko Martinović, the investigative judge who conducted the case, claimed that the gay rights movement was "in effect, a 'gateway' for all kinds of sects conducting a special war against our country". This led Nebrigić's colleagues to believe that his murder was a direct result of his activism.

Nebrigić was buried on 31 December 1999 at the Catholic cemetery in Pančevo. During his lifetime, he refused to be part of Serbian politics, refused the Serbian army and refused to be buried in a Serbian cemetery. In 2000, Dejan Nebrigić posthumously received the Felipa de Souza Award, which is awarded by the OutRight Action International, for his contribution to LGBT human-rights activism.
