= HQC =

HQC may refer to:

- Hannan–Quinn information criterion, a statistics measure
- Hamming Quasi-Cyclic, an algorithm selected in the NIST Post-Quantum Cryptography Standardization
- Halal Quality Control, a Halal certification in Europe
- Harare Queer Collective, a Zimbabwean LGBTQ organization founded by Jordan Chanetsa
- The Highway Q.C.'s, an American gospel group
