= Outright International =

LGBTIQ human rights organization

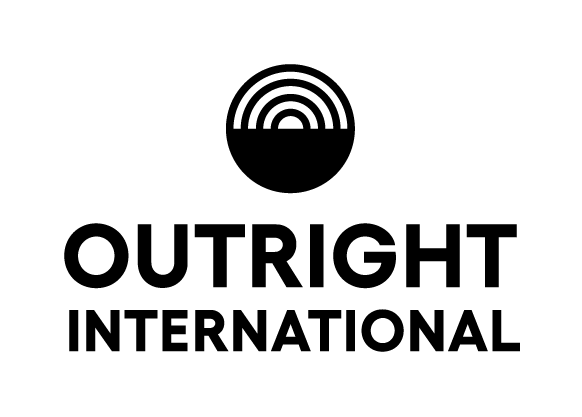
- Abbreviation: Outright
- Formation: 1990; 36 years ago
- Type: NGO
- Purpose: LGBTQ rights; human rights
- Headquarters: New York City
- Region served: worldwide
- Board Co-Chairs: Kathy Teo, Elliot Vaughn
- Executive Director: Maria Sjödin
- Staff: 16–20
- Website: outrightinternational.org

Outright International (Outright) is an LGBTIQ human rights non-governmental organization (NGO) that addresses human rights violations and abuses against lesbian, gay, bisexual, transgender and intersex people. Outright International documents human rights discrimination and abuses based on their sexual orientation, gender identity, gender expression and sex characteristics in partnership with activists, advocates, media, NGOs and allies on a local, regional, national and international level. Outright International holds consultative status with ECOSOC.

== History ==
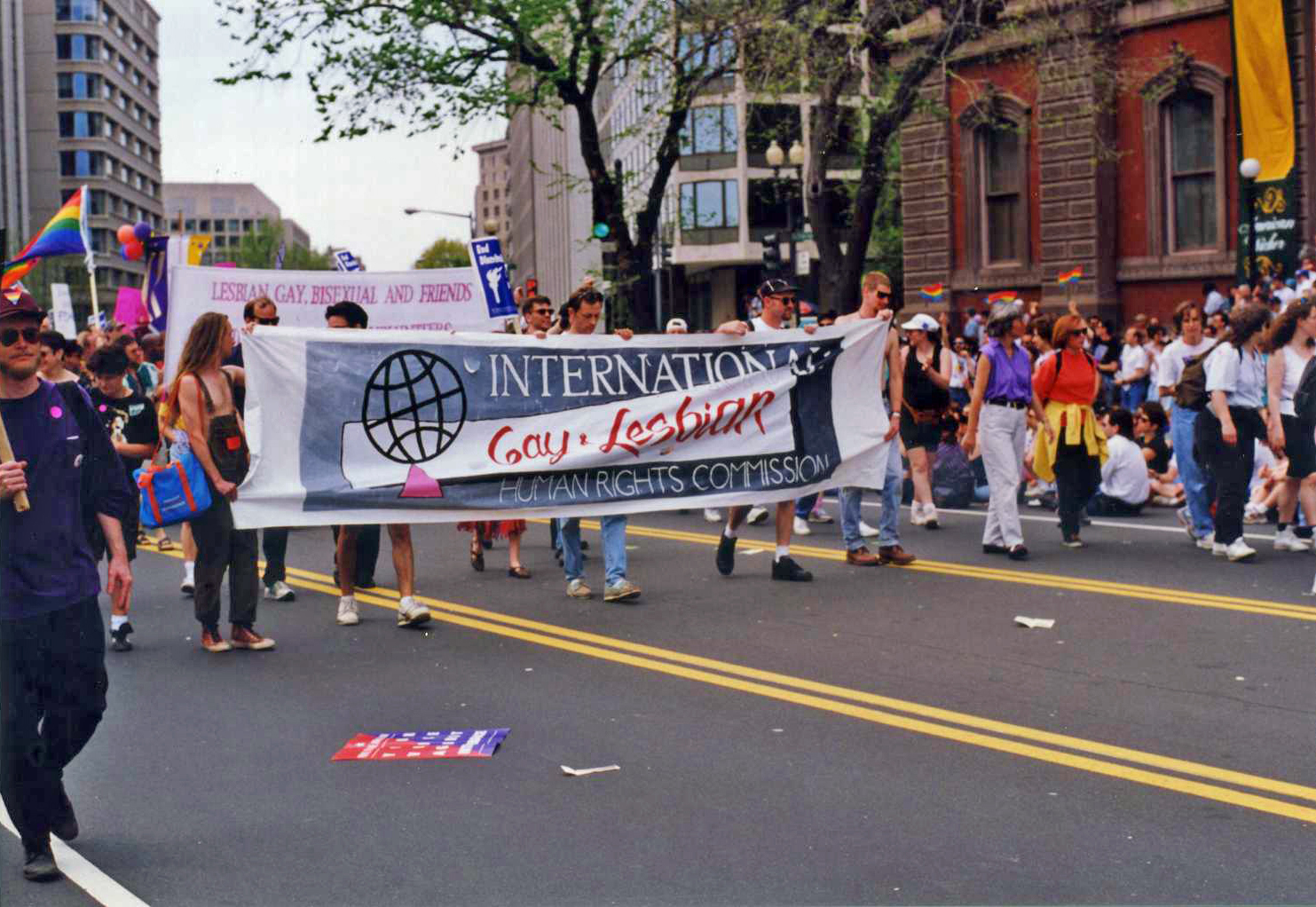
IGLHRC banner carried during the 1993 March on Washington for Lesbian, Gay, and Bi Equal Rights and Liberation

Outright International, formerly known as International Gay and Lesbian Human Rights Commission (IGLHRC), was founded by Julie Dorf in 1990, and incorporated as a non-profit organization on November 7, 1990. Though initially focused on LGBT human rights abuses in Russia, the organization is now active in many parts of the world, including the Americas, Africa, the Middle East, and Asia. Outright International is headquartered in New York City with satellite offices on the West Coast and in Spain, and Manila. Outright International has a digital archive of their LGBT human rights documentation and education materials for research.

On July 19, 2010, the United Nations Economic and Social Council voted to accredit IGLHRC as one of the NGOs granted consultative status with the international organization. This allows IGLHRC to attend U.N meetings, contribute statements, and collaborate with United Nations agencies.

In 2010, IGLHRC contributed in forming "An Activist's Guide" of the Yogyakarta Principles.

In 2015, on the 25th anniversary of the International Gay and Lesbian Human Rights Commission (IGLHRC), the organization changed its name to Outright Action International to make it more inclusive.

In 2015, Outright's executive director Jessica Stern presented the first United Nations Security Council briefing on LGBTI human rights violations.

In 2015, Outright in partnership with CUNY Law School started a one-day conference on Human Rights Day called OutSummit.

In 2016, as a member of the United Nations LGBTI Core Group, Outright took part in a high level UN event that included the 8th Secretary-General Ban Ki-moon, 47th United States Vice President Joe Biden, President of Chile, Michelle Bachelet and Prime Minister of Norway, Erna Solberg.

In 2017, Outright challenged the inclusion of Center for Family and Human Rights (C-Fam) to the US delegation at the UN CSW 2017.

In 2018, Neish McLean, executive director of TransWave and Outright Caribbean Program Officer, presented the intervention statement on behalf of the Major Groups and Other Stakeholders in response to Jamaica's Voluntary National Reviews at the United Nations.

In 2019, Outright worked with UN Women to be a part of a historic panel at the United Nations on "Gender Diversity: Beyond Binaries".

In 2022, Outright dropped "Action" from its name, formally becoming Outright International and clarified their mission to ensure human rights for LGBTIQ people everywhere through brand pillars: Amplify, Advocate, Support, and Celebrate.

== Programs ==
Outright's work is organized in four regional programs (Asia, the Middle East and North Africa, sub-Saharan Africa and Latin America and the Caribbean), and cross-regional programs focused on the United Nations, global research and safety and security for LGBTIQ activists.

Work in the Asia region promotes acceptance of sexual and gender diversity at all levels of society. The 2014 Report "Violence: Through The Lens of Lesbians, Bisexual Women And Trans People in Asia" collected and reviewed data from five countries in the region. Recent projects focused on domestic violence protections for LGBT in the Philippines and Sri Lanka.

Work in the Caribbean region supports organizations to achieve legal registration and provides support in establishing and building the capacity of newly founded organizations as well as combating gender-based violence.

=== Research program ===
Outright International's Research Program collects quantitative and qualitative data through surveys and case studies to promote global LGBTIQ advocacy and address issues on religion, culture, policy, government, and social norms of gender sexuality, gender expression, and sexual orientation. This research is analyzed for use by local, regional, international and communications fronts.

- Outright conducted the first-ever global survey in 2019 "Harmful Treatment: The Global Reach of So-called Conversion Therapy" on the causes and effects of "conversion therapy" using interviews with experts and survivors around the world. The report dives into its main justifications by perpetrators, the most common conversion therapy practices used, and includes cases studies from people who have been through such programs. The survey provides insight on the social, cultural, and religious norms which undermine the identities and sexualities of LGBTIQ people.
- A survey in 2018 "The Global State of LGBTIQ Organizing: The Right to Register" in 194 countries and found that only 56%, 109 countries, permit LGBTIQ organizations to register as so. In just 28%, 55 countries, LGBTIQ organizations exist but they cannot legally register. Outright is concerned that LGBTIQ people in these countries may be at higher risk of discrimination and violence, as well as lack resources and funding.
- Partnered with local LGBTIQ groups in the Middle East and North Africa (MENA), with a focus on Iran, Iraq, and Turkey, to support activists and allies. The 2018 report "Activism and Resilience: LGBTQ Progress in the Middle East and North Africa" explains how activism in the region leads to progress on LGBTQ issues, and how challenges are met with the resilience by the movement.

=== United Nations program ===
Outright is the first and only U.S.-based LGBTIQ human rights organization to obtain consultative status with the United Nations Economic and Social Council (ECOSOC). Outright uses its status to work as an organizer convening of groups and activists coming to New York to conduct advocacy on LGBTIQ issues at the United Nations. Outright does direct advocacy work across the United Nations with a focus on the General Assembly, Commission on the Status of Women, and High-level Political Forum on Sustainable Development. Two Outright events bridge UN direct advocacy work with global LGBTIQ activists and advocates: Advocacy Week and the UN Religious Fellowship. Outright engages relevant national, regional and international stakeholders, including UN member State missions, UN special mechanisms, UN agencies and the UN Secretariat to support LGBTIQ rights at UN headquarters, including the United Nations LGBTI Core Group.

== Awards ==
=== Felipa de Souza Award ===
Since 1994, Outright confers an annual award, the Felipa de Souza Award, to honour a human rights activist or organization.

Year	Award	Location
1994	Juan Pablo Ordonez; ABIGALE; Lepa Mladjenovic	Colombia; South Africa; Serbia
1995	Tasmanian Gay and Lesbian Human Rights Group (TGLRG); Anjaree; Luiz Mott	Australia; Thailand; Brazil
1996	No award	
1997	Demet Demir; Genc Xhelaj; Sister Namibia Collective; Wilfredo Valencia Palacios (honourable mention)	Turkey; Albania; Namibia; El Salvador
1998	Circulo Cultural Gay (CCG); Dr. Tal Jarus-Hakak; Dede Oetomo; Nancy Cardenas (1934–1994, posthum); Carlos Jáuregui (1958–1996, posthumous)	Mexico; Israel; Indonesia; Mexico; Argentina
1999	Aung Myo Min; Prudence Mabele; Kiri Kiri and Chingu Sai; Simon Nkoli (1957–1998, posthumous)	Burma; South Africa; South Korea; South Africa
2000	Dejan Nebrigić (1970–1999, posthumous); Ditshwanelo - The Botswana Center for Human Rights; Intersex Society of North America (ISNA); William Hernandez	Serbia; Botswana; United States; El Salvador
2001	Companions on a Journey and Women's Support Group; Jamaica Forum for Lesbians, All-Sexuals and Gays (J-Flag); Luis Gauthier (1950–2000, posthumous)	Sri Lanka; Jamaica; Chile
2002	Elizabeth Calvet (posthumous); Marta Lucia Alvarez Giraldo, Marta Lucia; Tamayo Rincon and Alba Nelly Montoya; Cui Zi En; Maher Sabry	Brazil Colombia; China; Egypt
2003	Lohana Berkins	Argentina
2004	Gender/Sexuality Rights Association Taiwan (G/STRAT)	Taiwan
2005	GALZ (Gays & Lesbians of Zimbabwe)	Zimbabwe
2006	Rauda Morcos (ASWAT)	Israeli Palestinian activist from Haifa, Israel
2007	Blue Diamond Society	Nepal
2008	Iranian Queer Organization; Andrés Ignacio Rivera Duarte	Canada / Iranian Diaspora; Chile
2009	Helem Lebanese Protection for LGBT	Lebanon
2010	Colombia Diversa	Colombia
2011	LGBT Centre Mongolia	Mongolia
2012	Karen Atala	Chile
2013	Yasemin Öz	Turkey
2014	Gay Japan News; KRYSS; O; Rainbow Rights Project (R-Rights); Women's Support Group	Japan, Malaysia, Pakistan, Philippines, Sri Lanka
2015	Chesterfield Samba, GALZ (Gays & Lesbians of Zimbabwe)	Zimbabwe
2016	Arus Pelangi, National Federation of LGBTI Communities in Indonesia	Indonesia
2017	Caleb Orozco	Belize
2018	Georges Azzi	
2019	Rikki Nathanson	Zimbabwe/US

=== Outspoken Award ===
Outright occasionally presents the Outspoken Award to special honorees. The Outspoken Award "recognizes the leadership of a global ally to the lesbian, gay, bisexual, transgender and intersex (LGBTI) community whose outspokenness has contributed substantially to advancing the rights and understanding of LGBTI people everywhere."

Year presented	Awardee
2005	The first Outspoken Award was presented to the Honorable Mary Robinson, former President of Ireland and the UN High Commissioner for Human Rights.
2008	IGLHRC presented the second Outspoken Award to Archbishop Desmond Tutu.
2010	Michel Sidibé, executive director of UNAIDS.
2011	Journalist and author Jeff Sharlet.
2016	United Nations Free and Equal Campaign, Randy Barry, US Special Envoy for the human rights of LGBTI people, and Dan Bross, Microsoft executive, and LGBT rights advocate.
2017	Logo TV was accepted by Pamela Post, Vice President of original programming and series development, and OutStanding Awardee Blanche Wiesen Cook, prize-winning biographer of Eleanor Roosevelt.
2018	Lois Whitman, a children's human rights activist.
2019	Cast of the TV series Transparent.

== See also ==
- LGBTQI+ rights at the United Nations
- Universal Declaration of Human Rights
- Intersex civil society organizations
- Intersex human rights
- WorldPride
- Gender Identity
- Transgender rights
- Violence against LGBTQ people
