= Demet Demir =

Turkish LGBT activist

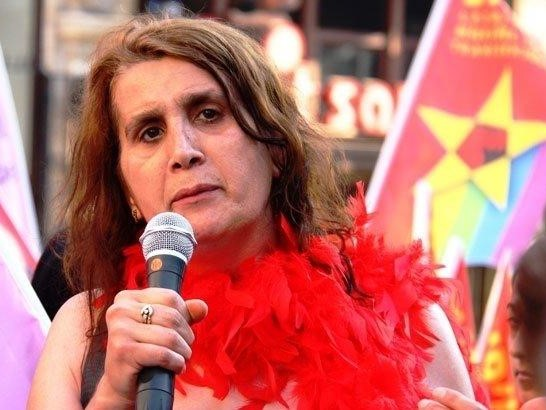

Demet Demir (born March 12, 1961) is a Turkish LGBT activist. She was awarded the Felipa de Souza Award in 1997 for her activism.

== Biography ==
Demir was born in Yalova on March 12, 1961. After her parents divorced, she and her sister moved to Istanbul when Demir was five. Demir was assigned male at birth, but discovered her trans identity around the age of 17, on reading about Bülent Ersoy. Her subsequent meetings with similar people at Taksim Gezi Park and nearby nightclubs, which were attended LGBT people, reinforced her preferences.

In 1979, she became involved with Turkey's leftist movement and was arrested on 1 May 1980 during a demonstration for Labour Day. All throughout, she used to hide her trans-sexuality to gain acceptance within the political movement. Post her arrest, she was allegedly tortured by police, before being sent to hospitals dealing with sexual diseases in a bid to cure her of homosexuality. After the 1980 coup in Turkey, Demir was sentenced to 15 months in prison for her political work, beginning 1982, but was released after 8 months. During her imprisonment, fellow prisoners came to know of her non-hetero-normative identity and she was subject to isolation.

After coming out of prison, she began to assert her sexual identity but did not immediately engage in LGBT activism. According to Demir, the spans were oppressive for queer people; they were often subject to illegal detentions, physical abuse, active discrimination, forced displacement and sexual assault. She was allegedly tortured in illegal government custody, three times in 1983 and witnessing raids by military police in nightclubs of Beyoğlu and ghettos of Cihangir, to rape homosexuals. She received little support from the leftist parties during these spans who considered trans-sexuality as a bourgeois disease and gradually grew disillusioned.

Thereafter, she joined the Radikal Demokratik Birlik, which was responsible for initiating the first movement in Turkey to eliminate discrimination and violence against LGBT people and other minorities. She grew more aware of the perpetuation of systemic violence by the state against minorities and learned about the concepts of feminism, environmentalism and militarism. In 1989, Demir joined the Human Rights Association (HRA), where she contributed in the setting up of the Sexual Minorities Commission and other similar platforms with fellow feminists Ayşe Düzkan, Filiz Karakuş et al. and eventually became HRA's first transgender delegate. Her efforts were mostly unsuccessful due to exclusion by the socialist majority. In the same year, she was subject to active discrimination (and subsequent torture), while attending a court trial on behalf of HRA, since her physical features did not align with her self-declared gender over the ID card.

In 1991, Demir was again imprisoned for two months and tortured by Süleyman the “Hose” Ulusoy, the then police chief of Beyoğlu, who had a fearsome reputation for his acts of violence against transvestites. She thus became the first person to qualify as an Amnesty prisoner of conscience and thereafter, Amnesty International included homosexuality on their list of political crimes. Whilst she tried to take legal action, she was unsuccessful.

Demir stood up for the rights of transsexual sex workers in 1995, when they were being arrested (and evicted) in order to "clean up" the neighborhood to organise the United Nations Habitat Conference, thus bringing greater visibility to transgender rights in Turkey. In 1996, she underwent a sex reassignment surgery to get a woman identity card and subsequently freelanced at workshops and press studios, before joining a company to avail of future retirement benefits.

In 1997, OutRight Action International (formerly International Gay and Lesbian Human Rights Commission) gave Demir the Felipa de Souza Award. Demir was arrested and physically abused on 12 July 1997, when she tried to stop police from beating up a girl who was selling handkerchiefs made by transgender people to earn a livelihood outside of prostitution. She was coming out of a workshop, organized to promote employment skills for the transvestite and transsexual community. Demir had enough of being harassed for her activism and subsequently sued the Beyoğlu District Police Bureau. The case was repeatedly postponed before the court ruled in her favor in 2003 and awarded a 21-year sentence against Ulusoy, which was immediately vacated by the government under an amnesty provision.

In 1999, Demir became a candidate at the Beyoğlu City Council elections for the Freedom and Solidarity Party (ÖDP), thus becoming the first transgender candidate to run in any general election in Turkey. She was unsuccessful. In 2007, she unsuccessfully ran for the position of deputy in Isparta. In 2008, Demir and other transgender activists created LGBTT Istanbul.

She has been vocal about the discriminatory and harsh attitude of police towards the transgender community and of the community being often compelled to embrace prostitution for earning a livelihood. She has also criticized about the lack of media-space allotted to individuals from the queer spectrum. She was responsible for printing and distributing the first pink triangle badges in Turkey and had successfully campaigned for repealing of gender discriminatory laws.

Demir has been the subject of a video-exhibition by noted artist Kutluğ Ataman.
