= Elizabeth Calvet =

Brazilian human rights activist (1960–2001)

Elizabeth Calvet (1960–2001) was a Brazilian human rights activist. Primarily known for her work during the earliest stages of the lesbian rights movement in Brazil, she also had a long career advocating for the rights of marginalised communities, including travestis, prisoners, and the homeless.

== Early life and education ==
Calvet was born in 1960 in Rio de Janeiro to Danillo and Maria Magdalena Calvet. She identified as a black lesbian woman. Calvet studied dentistry for a time as a young adult, but eventually abandoned her studies to focus on activism.

== Activism ==
After a period supporting incarcerated people and their families, in 1987 Calvet co-founded the Movement of Family Members and Friends of Prisoners (Portuguese: Movimento de Familiares e Amigos dos/as Presos(as)). She later joined the Integrated Programme for Marginalised People (Programa Integrado da Marginalidade, PIM), where she and several travesti activists set up the Association of Travestis and Released Individuals (Associação de Travestis e Liberados, ASTRAL). Calvet later spearheaded PIM's Acorda Egresso project, which supported vulnerable populations in Brazil, including travestis, as well as released prisoners and the homeless.

During the 1990s, Calvet shifted her focus to working with women. In 1994, she was among the co-founders of the Coisa de Mulher Documentation and Information Centre (Centro de Documentação e Informação Coisa de Mulher, CEDIM), which worked to support women by addressing issues of domestic abuse, sexual violence, gender and racial discrimination, poverty, and the impact of HIV/AIDS. The following year, Calvet co-founded the Lesbian Collective of Rio de Janeiro (Coletivo de Lésbicas do Rio de Janeiro, COLERJ), advocating for the rights of incarcerated and formerly incarcerated LGBTQ women, in addition to providing education on the prevention of sexually transmitted diseases. COLERJ also sought to gain greater visibility and prominence for black lesbians. Calvet challenged commonly-held medical views that lesbians were not at risk of contracting sexually transmitted diseases due to them not engaging in penile-vaginal sexual intercourse. She also sought to reclaim the historically derogotary term sapatão to refer to gay women, describing the reclamation of the term a political issue.

Calvet and fellow COLERJ member Neusa das Dores organised the first National Lesbian Seminar, which took place on 29 August 1996 in Rio de Janeiro. The programme focused on the theme "health, visibility, and organisation" (saúde, visibilidade e organização), and concluded with the date being declared National Lesbian Visibility Day. The first seminar had around 100 participants, and Calvet and Dores were able to get support from local politicians such as Jurema Batista. Discussions at the event included organisational strategies, greater visibility of the movement, and improved access to healthcare.

As a lesbian activist, Calvet took part in international meetings and conferences in the latter 1990s, including the Women and Democracy Meeting in Santo Domingo and the Feminist Meeting of Latin America and the Caribbean in Juan Dolio, Dominican Republic.

== Death and legacy ==
In 2000, Batista initiated a motion of praise and recognition from Rio de Janeiro City Council.

Calvet died in 2001 at the age of 41. No reason was given for her cause of death. In 2002, Calvet posthumously received the Felipa de Souza Award, alongside Marta Lucia Tamayo Rincon, Martia Lucia Alvarez Giraldo, Alba Nelly Montoya, Cui Zi'en, and Maher Sabry. The award, from the International Gay and Lesbian Human Rights Organisation, recognises individuals and groups working for the fundamental human rights of all people.
