= GALZ =

LGBTI activism in Zimbabwe

- An association of LGBTI people in Zimbabwe
- Logo
- Formation: 1990
- Founded at: Harare
- Purpose: LGBT rights in Zimbabwe
- Website: galz.org

GALZ also known as An Association of LGBTI People in Zimbabwe (formerly Gays and Lesbians of Zimbabwe) is an organisation established in 1990 in Harare to serve the needs of the lesbian, gay, bisexual, transgender and intersex (LGBTI) community in Zimbabwe. GALZ's vision is "a just society that promotes and protects human rights of LGBTI people as equal citizens in Zimbabwe".

GALZ is the largest organisation in the country specifically working to promote, represent and protect the rights of the LGBTI community. It networks extensively with other human-rights NGOs and regional associates, and has been involved in a number of high-profile campaigns. The organisation runs a resource centre in Harare which provides professional counselling, entertainment and educational activities for members, and is involved in campaigning on broader issues such as access to HIV treatment.

It does its work against a background of persecution and repression of gays and lesbians in Zimbabwe: historically, the State, the President, and church leaders have encouraged homophobia, and there is a general lack of societal tolerance for sexual or gender difference.

== History ==
After Zimbabwean independence in 1980, a gay and lesbian social scene grew up in the larger cities. By the late 1980s, a need was felt for a formal organization, and GALZ was launched in September 1990. Initially, GALZ had around 70 members, which grew to around 500 in 2000. In recent years, however, numbers have fallen, with many members seeking asylum in less repressive countries. Membership initially also consisted largely of male, white or mixed-race middle-class professionals, but since then the association has grown to represent the broader LGBTI community.

At first, GALZ was primarily Harare-based – in 2004, more than half of the members came from Harare or neighbouring Chitungwiza. The Affinity Group Programme was set up in 2002 for members living outside Harare, who had previously not been able to take full advantage of GALZ services and resources. Membership has subsequently grown significantly in ten other urban areas, including Bulawayo, Chipinge, Chitungwiza, Marondera, Masvingo, Mutare, Penhalonga and Victoria Falls. In these regional groups, the programme offers hands-on experience in proposal writing, financial management and report writing. Training in strategic planning and organisational development is provided through an annual conference (AGM). GALZ has permanent resource centres in Bulawayo, Masvingo and Mutare.

GALZ has strengthened its position with its support for more mainstream Zimbabwean human-rights campaigns. In 1998, it joined the National Constitutional Assembly (NCA), a coalition of civic groups and individuals pushing for a new national constitution. Also in 1998, GALZ joined other groups on a march through central Harare on International Human Rights Day – even though the police had refused to provide protection if GALZ took part. The association also established links with Padare/Enkundleni, a men's gender forum supporting women in the struggle against gender violence. In 1999, GALZ became one of the founder members of the Zimbabwe Human Rights NGO Forum, set up to assist victims of torture and report on State human rights violations, and is also a member of the Crisis in Zimbabwe Coalition.

GALZ is part of a network of regional organisations in southern and eastern Africa. According to their website, "GALZ has played a significant role in the struggle for LGBTI emancipation in Africa by showing others on the continent that it is indeed possible for lesbian and gay people to organise openly in hostile, homophobic climates." GALZ, along with 21 other groups from 17 African countries, was involved in the All Africa Rights Initiative, launched in Johannesburg in 2004, at the first All Africa Symposium on HIV/AIDS and Human Rights. GALZ has particularly strong links with groups in South Africa: a founding member of the National Coalition for Gay and Lesbian Equality, GALZ also works with Behind the Mask and the Gay and Lesbian Archives). GALZ has also collaborated frequently with two Namibian groups, The Rainbow Project and Sister Namibia. GALZ also has a relationship with LEGABIBO in Botswana. GALZ is part of a pan-African consortium of 10 organisations serving sexual minorities and marginalized groups known as the Love Alliance, which was set up with the support of AIDSfonds and the Embassy of Netherlands.

In the area of HIV/AIDS, GALZ has a longstanding relationship with the Triangle Project and the Treatment Action Campaign (TAC) in South Africa, and is involved in the Pan African Treatment Action Campaign. GALZ is also a partner in the Sex Rights African Network. GALZ is also a subgrantee of the Global Fund, where it implements activities in partnership with the National AIDS Council. GALZ was part of the organisations that contributed to the development and publishing of the Ministry of Health (MoHCC)'s Manual for Key Populations. Key Populations is a collective label given by UNAIDS to marginalized groups left out in the initial HIV/AIDS response of the 90s and 2000s. These groups include adolescent women and young girls (AWYG), men who have sex with men (MSM), transgender persons, women who have sex with women (WSW), sex workers, people who use/inject drugs and prisoners.

== The Zimbabwe International Book Fair controversy ==
Zimbabwean President Robert Mugabe received worldwide criticism for homophobic comments he made after seeing the GALZ stall at the 1995 International Book Fair in Harare. He said:

I find it extremely outrageous and repugnant to my human conscience that such immoral and repulsive organizations, like those of homosexuals, who offend both against the law of nature and the cultural norms espoused by our society, should have any advocates in our midst and elsewhere in the world.

Two weeks later, at Zimbabwe's annual independence celebrations, Mugabe proclaimed:

It degrades human dignity. It's unnatural, and there is no question ever of allowing these people to behave worse than dogs and pigs. If dogs and pigs do not do it, why must human beings? We have our own culture, and we must re-dedicate ourselves to our traditional values that make us human beings. ... What we are being persuaded to accept is sub-animal behavior and we will never allow it here. If you see people parading themselves as Lesbians and Gays, arrest them and hand them over to the police!

President Mugabe went on to increase the political repression of homosexuals. GALZ itself became the target of infiltration by government spies and extortion attempts. LGBT people were repeatedly bribed, detained, killed, beaten and sometimes raped by the authorities. The Central Intelligence Organisation was reportedly used to beat and arrest homosexuals.

The Book Fair controversy proved something of a turning point for the gay and lesbian rights movement in the country. As GALZ states on its website, "The lesbian and gay issue was the real litmus test for the deteriorating human rights situation in Zimbabwe ... not until 1995 did it finally become accepted that the ruling party (ZANU-PF) was prepared to use whites, gays and any other stigmatised minority as political scapegoats and target all perceived enemies who posed a threat to its power base." Ultimately, the controversy alerted international rights organisations such as Amnesty International to the dire situation for sexual minorities in Zimbabwe. Amnesty condemned Zimbabwe's state homophobia and began letter-writing campaigns in support of LGBTI rights in the country. In 1996, the International Gay and Lesbian Human Rights Commission (IGLHRC) also began to support GALZ' struggle. GALZ is now a member of the International Lesbian and Gay Association (ILGA), and has an ongoing relationship with Amnesty International: in 1996, GALZ activist Pollyanna Mangwiro became the first lesbian activist to be adopted as an Amnesty International Human Rights Defender. In 1996 and 1997, GALZ attracted funding from HIVOS and the Southern African AIDS Trust (SAT), which enabled the association to establish offices. In 1998, the Ecumenical Support Services, IGLHRC and Amnesty assisted GALZ in its participation in the 8th Summit of the World Council of Churches in Harare. In 2005, GALZ was awarded the IGLHRC Felipa Award for its activities.

After Robert Mugabe's forced removal from the presidency in November 2017, Emmerson Mnangagwa was declared President of Zimbabwe. There were hopes that Mnangagwa would reverse Zimbabwe's decades-long persecution of LGBT people. In January 2018, Mnangagwa addressed the issue for the first time, saying: "Those people who want it [same-sex marriage] are the people who should canvass for it, but it's not my duty to campaign for this". In June, the Zimbabwe African National Union – Patriotic Front (ZANU-PF), the ruling political party, met with LGBT activists to discuss the situation of LGBT rights in Zimbabwe and to "improve the lives of LGBT people through local governance". Chester Samba, director of GALZ, said: "As an initial meeting it was great that they responded positively and somewhat surprising as this marked a departure from the previous leadership which did not engage with us. A willingness to engage is indeed an important shift."

GALZ launched its 2021-25 Strategic Plan under the theme 'Lead With Love'. This plan sets in motion the organisation's plans for movement-building, bolstering of health interventions, media strategy as well as legal and advocacy strategy within the wider Human Rights movement.

== Publications ==
The GALZ Information and Communications Department disseminates information to members and the broader public:

- Sahwira: Being Gay and Lesbian in Zimbabwe is a collection of coming-out stories in English, Shona and Ndebele (GALZ, Harare 1995, second edition, 2000).
- An Operational Manual for Gay and Lesbian Organising in Africa consists of PowerPoint slides on how to set up and manage an LGBTI organisation (GALZ, Harare, 2004).
- GALZ contributed the forward and other sections to The All-Africa Symposium on HIV/AIDS & Human Rights Report (2004).
- Understanding Human Sexuality and Gender (GALZ, Harare, 2005)
- In 2003, GALZ assisted IGLHRC and Human Rights Watch in compiling a report, More than a Name: State Sponsored Homophobia and Its Consequences in Southern Africa
- Unspoken Facts, A History of Homosexualities in Africa
- A quarterly magazine, the Galzette, as well as a regular newsletter, ORDAA!

== Awards and recognition ==
GALZ has twice won the Felipa de Souza Award for its promotion of human rights. It won the award in 2005 and again in 2015.

== See also ==
- Human rights in Zimbabwe
- LGBT rights in Africa
- List of LGBT rights organizations
- Gay community
- List of intersex organizations
- List of transgender-rights organizations
