= All Africa Rights Initiative =

Coalition of African LGBT organizations

All Africa Rights Initiative (or AARI) is a coalition of LGBT community organizations in Africa founded in 2004. The coalition advocates against homophobia and for LGBT rights in Africa.

== History ==
The initiative emerged from a conference in Johannesburg in February 2004, organized by GALZ (originally "Gays and Lesbians of Zimbabwe") and a poverty-relief organization from Uganda, and was linked to Human Rights Watch. The conference consisted of over 55 representatives from 22 LGBT movements groups originating in 17 African countries. The conference was initially convened to address HIV/AIDS education in Africa. The initiative has been described as an attempt to "respond to human rights crises in Africa with a unified voice, and to share experiences that could lead to greater self-confidence and reduced dependence upon Western gay rights associations and other foreign donors."

Due to the nature of homophobia across the continent, the conference did little to publicize its meeting at the time, and attendees refused to have their pictures taken. At the end of the conference, the organization issued a statement challenging the locally popular idea that homosexuality is a Western notion, alien to Africa: "We have and have always had a place in Africa. [African traditional culture] is based on principles of welcoming and belonging."
