= Prudence Nobantu Mabele =

South African activist (1971–2017)

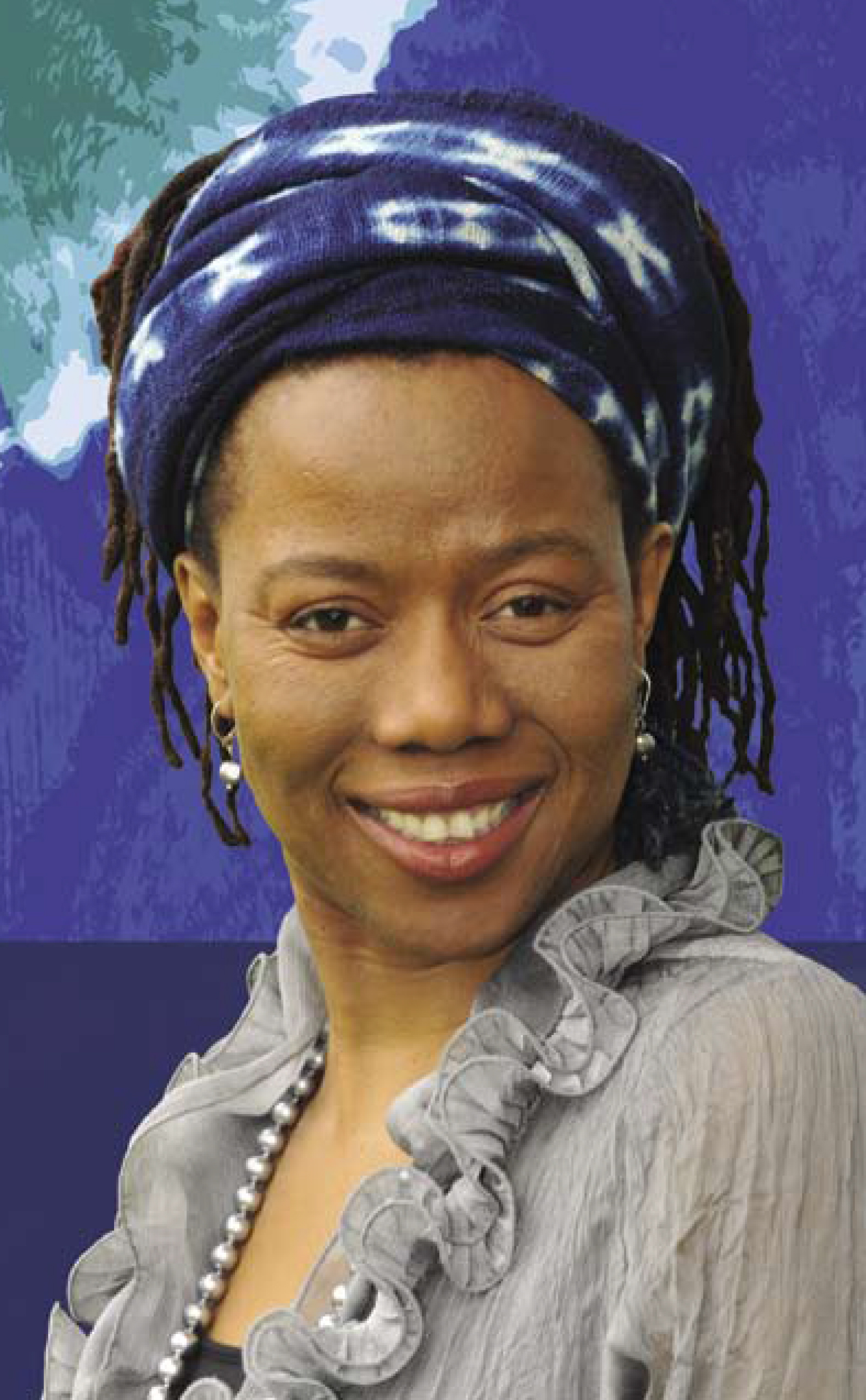
- Portrait of Prudence Mabele
- Born: 21 July 1971; Wattville, South Africa
- Died: 10 July 2017 (aged 45)
- Education: Cape Peninsula University of Technology
- Occupations: HIV/AIDS activist and sangoma
- Organization(s): Society for Women and AIDS in Africa, WomenNOW! Summit on Pan-African & African Diasporan Women's Sexual & Reproductive Health and Justice
- Awards: Woman of Courage Award from SOS Children's Villages, Felipa de Souza Award from the International Gay and Lesbian Human Rights Commission

Prudence Nobantu Mabele (21 July 1971 – 10 July 2017) was a South African activist who advocated for the rights of women and children living with HIV/AIDS, and against gender-based violence. She was diagnosed with HIV/AIDS in 1990 and went public with her status in 1992. She set up the Positive Women's Network in 1996. She worked with UNAIDS and also qualified as a sangoma. She was the recipient of many awards, including the Felipa de Souza award in 1999. In 2004, she carried the Olympic flame. She died in 2017 and in her memory the International AIDS Society set up an annual prize for gender activists.

== Early life ==
Prudence Nobantu Mabele was born in the Wattville township near Benoni, in the east of Johannesburg, South Africa on 21 July 1971. She was raised by her grandmother Nosifako Elizabeth Mabele and her grandfather July Mabele, as her mother was in exile and her father an uMkhonto we Sizwe soldier. The first of four sisters, Prudence left Wattville for Pietermaritzburg to obtain secondary education and afterwards attended the Technikon Witwatersrand and Cape Town Technikon.

She was first diagnosed with HIV/AIDS in 1990. Despite several challenges occasioned by the diagnosis of HIV infection at a young age, Prudence successfully obtained a diploma in light current electrical engineering in 1994. Her other academic accomplishments include a diploma in psychology at Intec College in 1996, a diploma in Management from the Wits Business School and Certificates on "Women in Management", "HIV and AIDS Leadership" and "Monitoring and Evaluation for Sexual and Reproductive Health Programs.

== Career ==
In 1992, Mabele made her positive HIV status public, making her one of the first South African women to do so. She became an activist for HIV awareness, founding the Positive Women's Network in 1996. At the time of her death, Mabele was the President of the Society for Women and AIDS in Africa and Deputy Chair of the Civil Society Forum – South African National AIDS Council. Mabele was a founding co-chair of WomenNOW! Summit on Pan-African & African Diasporan Women's Sexual & Reproductive Health and Justice. She was also a frequent collaborator with the Joint United Nations Programme on HIV/AIDS (UNAIDS).

Mabele completed her training as a sangoma (traditional doctor) in 2004. She took ARVs when they became available on the public health system in South Africa. She supported the use of ARVs because she herself had first-hand seen the destruction caused by AIDS. Mabele answered her calling to become a traditional healer several years after starting ARVs, and almost a decade after she found out her HIV status. Mabele was the target of a march in 2004 when more than 500 traditional healers marched to give her a petition against the Treatment Action Campaign (TAC). The issue was that TAC was only promoting ARVs and not traditional medicine.

Donors stopped funding support groups because they were no longer fashionable. But Pru knew the truth, which was that life for women happens in conversations, in the time it takes to sit with one another. Those groups were emotional life support for women who were in critical condition, whose lives had been shattered and whose hearts needed piecing together. Pru did that work. She visited so many grieving families. When lesbians were killed, Pru went. When another HIV-positive woman died, Pru was there. When a woman was murdered, Pru was at the front. Painted up, dolled up, voice ragged, breathing through her mouth, swearing and joking and sweating, she was there.

— Sisonke Msimang, The Pied Piper of the broken-hearted: HIV activist Prudence Mabele,

== Gender advocacy ==
Mabele was a strong advocate for ending violence against women and was a member of the One in Nine Campaign. One in Nine began in response to the rape trial of Jacob Zuma, who was at that time, Deputy President. One in Nine is named for the fact that only One in Nine women in South Africa reports crime to the police, a stark piece of evidence as to how inaccessible and unwelcoming the police and judicial system in SA is. She commented "I believe that the quality of women's leadership is even more important than the numbers of women in leadership." Mabele was one of the founding members of the Bring Back Our Girls South Africa campaign. She also starred in a film called Sunshine Boutique.

== Awards and recognition ==
Mabele received the honour of carrying the Olympic flame as part of an international torch relay for the 2004 Olympics in Greece. She was the recipient of many human rights awards over the course of her career. These included a Woman of Courage Award from SOS Children's Villages, Gauteng Provincial Government's premier woman award, Out's recognition for involvement in HIV/AIDS Activism and Eskom's workplace response recognition award. In 1999, she was given the Felipa de Souza Award by the International Gay and Lesbian Human Rights Commission.

== Death and legacy ==
Mabele died from pneumonia on 10 July 2017, at the age of 45. To mark her legacy, the International AIDS Society set up a $25,000 cash award for gender activists, funded by the Ford Foundation, Open Society Foundations and the Positive Women's Network of South Africa. The first award was given to Duduzile Dlamini in Amsterdam in 2018.
