= Arkadija =

Arkadija was the first group to affirm lesbian and gay human rights and culture in Serbia, established on January 13, 1991, and registered in 1994 in Belgrade. The basic function of the organization was lobbying the media in order to decriminalize homosexuality. In addition, members' activities focused on the abolition of all forms of discrimination against homosexuals in public state institutions.

== History ==
The organization was inspired by the Gay-Lesbian Pink Club initiative from Ljubljana, whose organizers contacted LGBT activists from Serbia in October 1990. The first meeting was held at the Hotel Moskva, with Lepa Mlađenović, Dejan Nebrigić, Boris Liler and other more famous activists. When choosing a name, Boris Lilera suggested Arkadija, "the land of love and freedom", which was the favoured proposal. In France, during the twentieth century, an LGBT magazine with the same name was published, and this was another reason for choosing the name.

Since it did not have premises or finances, the original work of the activists consisted of lobbying for the rights of lesbians and gays in predominantly independent media: B92, Republika, Vreme, Radio Pančevo, as well as in various magazines such as the Pacifik, founded by Dejan Nebrigić, and women's peace publications od the Women in Black.

On June 27, 1991, Arkadija publicly marked "Pride Day" on the platform of the Youth House, where several activists and art theoreticians spoke about gay and lesbian activism, culture and art. The following year, Arkadija attempted to organize a panel in the Student Protest at the Faculty of Philosophy, but the theology students prevented the audience and participants from entering the hall, and from that time Arkadija on June 27 marked stands and workshops closed to the public.

During the first two years, members of the group visited international conferences, sought support and prepared the Statute of Arkadija. This statute laid out the goals of the association including the reduction of discrimination and violence, the equalisation of the homosexual age of consent with heterosexual age of consent, decriminalisation, an end to treating homosexuality as a disease, the introduction of sexual education in schools including homosexuality and bisexuality as normal sexual preferences, an end to patriarchal domination in society, revision of family legislation, etc.

== Anti-war activism ==
During this period, war broke out in Yugoslavia, and members of the group became involved in anti-war activism, which slowed development and further planning around gay rights. The decision was made that Arkadija should not have a nationalistic narrative, and that the human rights of all discriminated groups should be promoted.

Four years after its launch, in 1994, the Centre for Women's Studies was selected as the seat of the organization. In 1995, the number of active participants in the group increased, and representatives of the women's movement decided to become independent from Arkadija. They self-organized, and Ljiljana Živković and Jelena Labris launched a new organization called Labris, which was registered in 2000.
