= Jordan Chanetsa =

Zimbabwean transgender activist (born 1997)

- Born: 1997 (age 28–29); Harare, Zimbabwe
- Education: National School of the Arts
- Occupations: Human rights activist Artist
- Organization: Harare Queer Collective
- Known for: Advocacy for LGBTQ people in Zimbabwe

Jordan Chanetsa (born c. 1997) is a Zimbabwean human rights activist and artist. A trans woman, she was the founded of the Harare Queer Collective, an organisation promoting the establishment of safe spaces for LGBTQ people in Zimbabwe.

== Biography ==
Chanetsa was born in Bulawayo, Matabeleland, and raised in Harare. Her parents, who were both of mixed ancestry, were ministers at a megachurch; her father was also a radio host. Chanetsa attended the National School of the Arts in Johannesburg, South Africa, where she was first exposed to ballroom culture.

Chanetsa came out as gay at the age of 14, for which she experienced bullying and harassment, including from some members of her own family. She later realised she was transgender, and came out as a trans woman on Facebook. Chanetsa struggled to find legal work due to her gender identity differing from what was recorded on her official documents; she frequently wrote about her experiences as a transgender person on Facebook, and by 2017 had started to gain popularity on social media. Through this, she began working for a sexual and reproductive rights group, though she left after experiencing discrimination and transphobia. Chanetsa organised a campaign called "16 Days of Activism against Gender-based Violence", for which she received an award from the Dutch embassy in Harare.

Chanetsa participated in Women Deliver's Young Leaders Programme in recognition of her work promoting gender equality, LGBTQ rights and sexual health.

Chanetsa was critical of established LGBTQ organisations in Zimbabwe, which she felt were led by older activists who were unwilling to consider the different struggles and experiences of younger LGBTQ people in the country; she also felt that international aid was often earmarked for sexual health and HIV prevention as opposed to the emotional and social wellbeing of LGBTQ people. In 2019, Chanetsa founded the Harare Queer Collective (HQC), with the aim of establishing safe places across the city where it would be safe for LGBTQ people to meet and socialise. The HQC has held events including balls and open mic nights. During the COVID-19 pandemic, the HQC raised US$15,000 to support with relief efforts.

Following her popularity on social media, Chanetsa began to appear more frequently on Zimbabwean television and radio, where she frequently commented on the experiences of LGBTQ people living in Zimbabwe, such as commenting on politics for Transcending the Ballot Box on Bustop TV. In 2020, her own show, The Naked Truth, which focused on gender, sexuality and health, premiered; she also began hosting a podcast, Her Hour.

Between June and October 2022, Chanetsa was the artist in residence at the Akademie der Künste der Welt in Cologne, Germany. In this role, she organised the Migration Kiki Ball at the Kulturbunker Köln, which looked at the experiences of non-white immigrants in Germany. In 2022, Chanetsa released a short film, A Trance, consisting of a collage of images and sounds; she also featured in the documentary Transgender in MugabeLand.
