= Tsitsi Tiripano =

Zimbabwean lesbian activist (1967–2001)

Poliyanna Mangwiro
- Born: 1967; Zimbabwe
- Died: May 2001 (aged 33–34); Zimbabwe
- Other name: Tsitsi Tiripano
- Citizenship: Zimbabwean
- Occupation: Human rights activist
- Years active: 1988–2001
- Organizations: Gays and Lesbians of Zimbabwe (GALZ)
- Known for: Lesbian rights activism in Zimbabwe
- Notable work: Advocacy for LGBTQ rights and HIV support initiatives
- Awards: Amnesty International Human Rights Defender of the Year (2000)

Poliyanna Mangwiro (1967 – May 2001), known as Tsitsi Tiripano, was a Zimbabwean lesbian activist. In 2000, Amnesty International honored her as a human rights defender of the year.

== Personal life ==
Poliyann Mangwiro was born in 1967, the oldest child in her family. At age 15, she was forcibly married off to a 55-year-old male Christian church leader in her community.

Several years later, at age 21, she left her husband and their two sons to live with a female partner in Harare. She returned to live in her home community of Marondera two years later and was able to reunite with her two children, then ages 16 and 18, whom her former husband allowed her to see on condition that she did not speak to them about homosexuality. Her sons eventually came to support her, and her former husband died due to his advanced age.

Tiripano died in 2001, in her mid-30s, of AIDS-related complications.

== Activism ==
In 1988, Mangwiro first heard the English term "lesbian" from a drag queen friend, learning that there were other women like herself who had relationships with women.

Out of concern for her safety as a lesbian activist, she began using the name Tsitsi Tiripano, "Tsitsi" meaning "compassion" and "Tiripano" meaning "we are there," as a way of expressing that the LGBTQ community exists and deserves compassion.

In 1993, Tiripano became the first black woman to join the Zimbabwean LGBTQ group GALZ. She worked with the organization to denounce homophobic violence in Zimbabwe. She also helped organize GALZ Positive, to support the organization's HIV-positive members.

While she was participating with GALZ at a book festival in 1996, Tiripano was attacked by a group of students, who burned her books. Media coverage of this attack, which included the press deciding to publish Tiripano's photo, made her the first publicly out lesbian in Zimbabwe. When she returned to her home in Marondera, she was met by villagers chanting homophobic slogans and threatening her with violence. When she asked a local governor to help her, he refused, arguing that homophobia was an official position approved by President Robert Mugabe.

Alongside Akın Birdal, Mehrangiz Kar, and Leopoldo Zessig, Tiripano was recognized as a human rights defender of the year by Amnesty International in 2000. After receiving this honor, she participated in a tour of North America and Europe to raise awareness of the situation of gay and lesbian Zimbabweans.
