= Rikki Nathanson =

Zimbabwean LGBTQ rights activist

- Born: 1965 (age 60–61); Zimbabwe
- Citizenship: Zimbabwean
- Occupations: Activist; Company secretary; Businesswoman
- Years active: 2005–present
- Organizations: Trans Research Education Advocacy and Training (TREAT); Sexual Rights Centre; Southern Africa Trans Forum; OutRight Action International
- Known for: Transgender rights activism; 2019 landmark court case in Zimbabwe
- Title: Founder of TREAT
- Awards: Felipa de Souza Award (2019); Dedicated Service Award - AHEA (2024)

Rikki Nathanson (born c. 1965) is a Zimbabwean transgender activist. She founded the organization Trans Research Education Advocacy and Training (TREAT) in 2015. After an arrest for entering a women's bathroom in Bulawayo in 2014, she filed a civil lawsuit for damages which she won in 2019. By that point, she had taken asylum in the US and she now lives in Maryland.

== Career and activism ==
Rikki Nathanson (born c. 1965) studied at the Institute of Chartered Secretaries and Administrators, becoming a company secretary. After transitioning, she opened a modelling agency in 2005. Her activism started around 2007, when she joined the board of the Sexual Rights Centre. Nathanson founded Trans Research Education Advocacy and Training (TREAT) in 2015. She is involved in the Southern Africa Trans Forum and Africa Key Populations Expert Group, which reports to the United Nations Development Programme. She currently heads the Global Trans Program at Outright International.

== Courtcases ==
In January 2014, Nathanson was arrested at a hotel in Bulawayo on the charge of criminal nuisance, after using a women's toilet. Six police officers wearing riot gear took her into custody, where she spent three days and two nights, being subjected to physical examinations to confirm her gender. When the case came to court, the judge asked the prosecution to explain what the nuisance had been, and it was established that no crime had been committed, so the charge was dropped.

Nathanson then decided upon a civil lawsuit against Farai Mteliso (the ZANU–PF activist who had called the police), Augustine Chihuri (then Commissioner-General of the police), Ignatius Chombo (then Minister of Home Affairs) and Chief Inspector Enock Masimba (then Bulawayo Central Police commander).

After five years, Nathanson won her court case in 2019. At the High Court, Justice Francis Bere stated in his summing up that "One cannot avoid concluding that the conduct of the police in arresting and detaining the plaintiff was quite outrageous because clearly, they abused their discretion in arresting her". He awarded damages of ZW$400,000 to Nathanson and left the costs to the defendants. Nathanson had requested for US$2.7 million in damages and ZW$400,000 was approximately US$1,100 at the time. "We are happy that justice, fairness and compassion has prevailed" said Tashwill Esterhuizen, a lawyer at the Southern African Litigation Centre (SALC). In Bere's judgement he also recognised transgender rights, saying Nathanson did not identify as male or female.

== Asylum ==
By the time of her legal victory in 2019, Nathanson was already living in the US, having successfully requested asylum. She moved to Rockville, Maryland and worked at Casa Ruby, an LGBTQ organisation based in Washington, D.C.. In September 2019, she joined the directorial board of OutRight Action International. She was awarded the Felipa de Souza Award by OutRight in 2019. She applied for asylum on December 27, 2018, after attending OutRight Action International’s annual summit in New York, and was granted asylum by the U.S. on February 15, 2019. Her decision followed ongoing surveillance in Zimbabwe, including her phone being tapped and a car following her in August 2018, followed by a brutal attack by suspected government agents. At Casa Ruby, she served as director of HIV/AIDS prevention and outreach, ending as director of housing when she left in 2021.
