= Felipa de Souza =

Portuguese activist (1556–1600)

Filipa de Sousa (Tavira, 1556 — Brazil, c. 1600), also referred to as Felipa de Souza, was a Portuguese woman accused of nefarious practices (lesbianism) by visitation of the Bahia Holy Office in the sixteenth century. Currently, her trial is considered the first case of sexual persecution and condemnation of lesbianism by the Court of the Holy Office in the lands of Vera Cruz. She is recognized as one of the first victims of homophobia in Brazil and is an icon of the country's LGBT movement.

== Biography ==
=== Origins and Family ===
Felipa was born in the Kingdom of Algarve's city of Tavira, 1556, the daughter to Manuel de Sousa and Maria Goncalves, Christian natives of the same locality. She then traveled to Salvador, Brazil, on condition of marriage to a New Christian silk producer. After being widowed, she married the mason Francisco Pires. She worked as a seamstress and had no children from either marriage.

=== Accusation by the Court of the Holy Office ===
In 1591 the first visitation occurred of the Portuguese Inquisition of the Holy Office of Salvador (the primary city of the then Portuguese colony of Brazil). Priest Heitor Furtado de Mendonca led the mission to obtain confessions and denunciations of heresies and practices of Judaism centered in the regions of Bahia, Pernambuco, Itamarac and Paraiba. Filipa da Sousa, then 35 years old, was denounced on December 18th of the same year by her lover Paula Siqueira, a Christian woman pressured by the discovery in her home of Jorge de Montemor's "Diana," a novella recounting the loving adventures of two shepherds and Index-banned by the church. Her accusations gave rise to a lawsuit in which 29 women were accused of homosexual practices.

Arrested to testify before the Tribunal of the Holy Office, Felipa had to defend herself both against the charge of "sodomy" with other women, and new accusations of crypto-Judaism. She eventually confessed to acts of lesbianism with at least six women in eight years.

=== Confession ===
Proclaiming that her affection for the female gender was natural and without sin, Felipa revealed that in 1583 she fell in love for the first time with a woman, Maria Peralta, daughter to New Christians Gaspar da Vila Costa and Ana de Siqueira. The two continued to meet in secret even after Maria's marriage to Thomas Bibentaon. After their relationship ended, Felipa kept other sporadic lovers, only returning to fall in love years later with the Lisbon-native Paula Siqueira, daughter to Manuel Pires and Mecia Roiz. The two had maintained a relationship for more than three years.

Confronted with the fact that her beloved had accused her of sexual harassment and of coercion, Felipa revealed that she had in her possession several love letters that she had exchanged with Paula Siqueira, which were later used as evidence during the trial. At the end of the inquiry, when the inquisitor asked why she had not confessed her sins previously, Felipa claimed she had been told by the Jesuit Antonio Velasquez that it was enough to confess sacramentally every Sunday, being forgiven everything, since the actions performed were "always without any other Instrument, more than their bodies alone." This proved their sexual preferences were known to the local church, and according to then Catholic doctrine and local customs, acts of eroticism among women without penetration were considered less sinful.

=== Sentence ===
Of the 29 women accused of lesbianism in the Bahia Captaincy, seven were tried and convicted. Felipa was the most severely punished, but was spared the penalty of death by burning solely because her sexual acts didn't involve penetration.

On January 26th, 1592, she was removed from the House of Inquisition dungeons in the Terreiro de Jesus, and forced to walk barefoot through the city streets in a procession of humiliation to the Church of the See. There, she heard her sentence, standing with a lit candle in her hands, and wearing a raw linen robe (this publicly identified her as one accused of heresy). She was condemned to scourging, exile, a fast on bread and water for 15 Fridays and nine Saturdays, 33 prayers, and payment for legal processes equivalent to three months work. After the public reading of the sentence, she was tied to the pillory and scourged. It was in the dungeon where she received medical attention for her injuries, lasting four days. She was expelled from the captaincy January 31st after her recovery. Since then, any further information about her whereabouts or end of life has been lost.

Her accuser, Paula Siqueira, had a milder sentence of six days prison and a fine, two public appearances as defendant, and certain spiritual penalties. It is thought she was the wife of Antonio de Faria, Major-Provider of Fazenda Real, and consequently, possessed a title or rank higher than many of the other women charged, hence the lighter sentence.

== Legacy and Tributes ==
In 1980, anthropologist Luiz Mott's research through the documents of the Holy Office, filed in Lisbon's Tombo Tower, brought Felipa's trial to light in his works "Lesbianism in Brazil" and "Forbidden Sex: Virgins, Gays, and Slaves in the Clutches of the Inquisition." Subsequently, her story as published in Paulo Rezzutti's "Women of Brazil: The Untold Story" gave new impetus to the LGBT cause in Brazil.

In honor, her name was given to the NGO Felipa de Souza (1998), and the International Gay and Lesbian Human Rights Commission and OutRight Action International instituted the Felipa de Souza Award in 1994.

== Sources ==
=== References ===
- Luiz Mott: O Lesbianismo no Brasil, Mercado Aberto (Brazil), 1987, ISBN 85-280-0022-2
