= LGBTQ people and Islam =

Within the Muslim world, sentiment towards LGBTQ people varies and has varied between societies and individual Muslims. While colloquial and de facto official acceptance of at least some homosexual and gender variant behaviors were commonplace in pre-modern periods, later developments, starting from the 19th century, have created a predominantly hostile environment for LGBTQ people.

There are differences in how the Quran and later hadith traditions (orally transmitted collections of Muhammad's teachings) treat homosexuality, with the latter being far more explicitly negative. This has caused rifts in legalistic opinion, as while all major schools of jurisprudence broadly agreed that liwat—anal sex between men—was haram, opinions varied in terms of the legality and severity of punishment, as well as the legal situation of women's same-sex relations. Furthermore, these formulations largely remained theoretical, as historical evidence from the pre-modern period shows de facto tolerance of homosexual relationships. Historical records also suggest that in the event that laws against homosexuality were invoked in the pre-modern period, they were done so mainly in cases of rape or other "exceptionally blatant infringement on public morals". These factors allowed themes of homoeroticism and pederasty to be cultivated in Islamic poetry and other Islamic literary genres from the 8th century CE into the modern era.

In the modern era, Muslim public attitudes towards homosexuality underwent a marked change beginning in the 19th century, largely due to the global spread of Islamic fundamentalist movements, namely Salafism and Wahhabism whose adherents believe in rigid and literalist version of Shariah. The Muslim world was also influenced by the sexual notions and norms that were prevalent in the Christian world at the time, particularly with regard to anti-LGBTQ legislation prevalent throughout European societies; a number of Muslim-majority countries that were once colonies of European empires retain colonial criminal penalties against homosexuality.

As Western culture eventually enabled a platform for the flourishing of many LGBTQ movements, many Muslim fundamentalists came to associate the Western world with "ravaging moral decay" and "rampant" homosexuality. In contemporary society, prejudice, anti-LGBTQ discrimination and anti-LGBTQ violence—including violence which is practiced within legal systems—persist in much of the Muslim world, exacerbated by socially conservative attitudes and the rise of Islamist ideologies in some countries. There are laws in place against homosexual activities in many Muslim-majority countries, with a number of them prescribing the death penalty for convicted offenders. In surveys of public opinion, the vast majority of Muslims across various countries reject the notion that homosexuality should be acceptable in society. Most Muslim-majority countries have opposed moves to advance LGBTQ rights and recognition at the United Nations (UN), including within the UN General Assembly and the UN Human Rights Council.

Despite these developments, contemporary Islamic jurisprudence generally accepts the possibility for transgender people (mukhannith/mutarajjilah) to change their gender status, but only after surgery, linking one's gender to biological markers. Trans people are nonetheless confronted with stigma, discrimination, intimidation, and harassment in many ways in Muslim-majority societies. Transgender identities are often considered under the gender binary, although some pre-modern scholars had recognized effeminate men (mukhannath) as a form of third gender, as long as their behaviour was natural and not a performance.

== History ==
Muslim attitudes to LGBTQ practices has varied throughout Islamic history; legal scholars condemned and often formulated punishments for homosexual acts, yet lenient (or often non-existent) enforcement allowed for toleration, and sometimes celebration of such acts.

Homoeroticism was idealized in the form of poetry or artistic declarations of love, often from an older man to a younger man or adolescent boy. This was accepted in courtly settings as a system of pederasty, though egalitarian same-sex relations also occurred (with the threat of the social censure of the passive partner, if revealed). Accordingly, the Arabic language had an appreciable vocabulary of homoerotic terms, with multiple words to describe types of male prostitutes, including those pre-dating Islam. Schmitt identifies some twenty words in Arabic, Persian, and Turkish to identify those who are penetrated. Other related Arabic words includes mukhannathun (effeminate men), ma'bûn, halaqī, and baghghā.

=== Pre-modern era ===
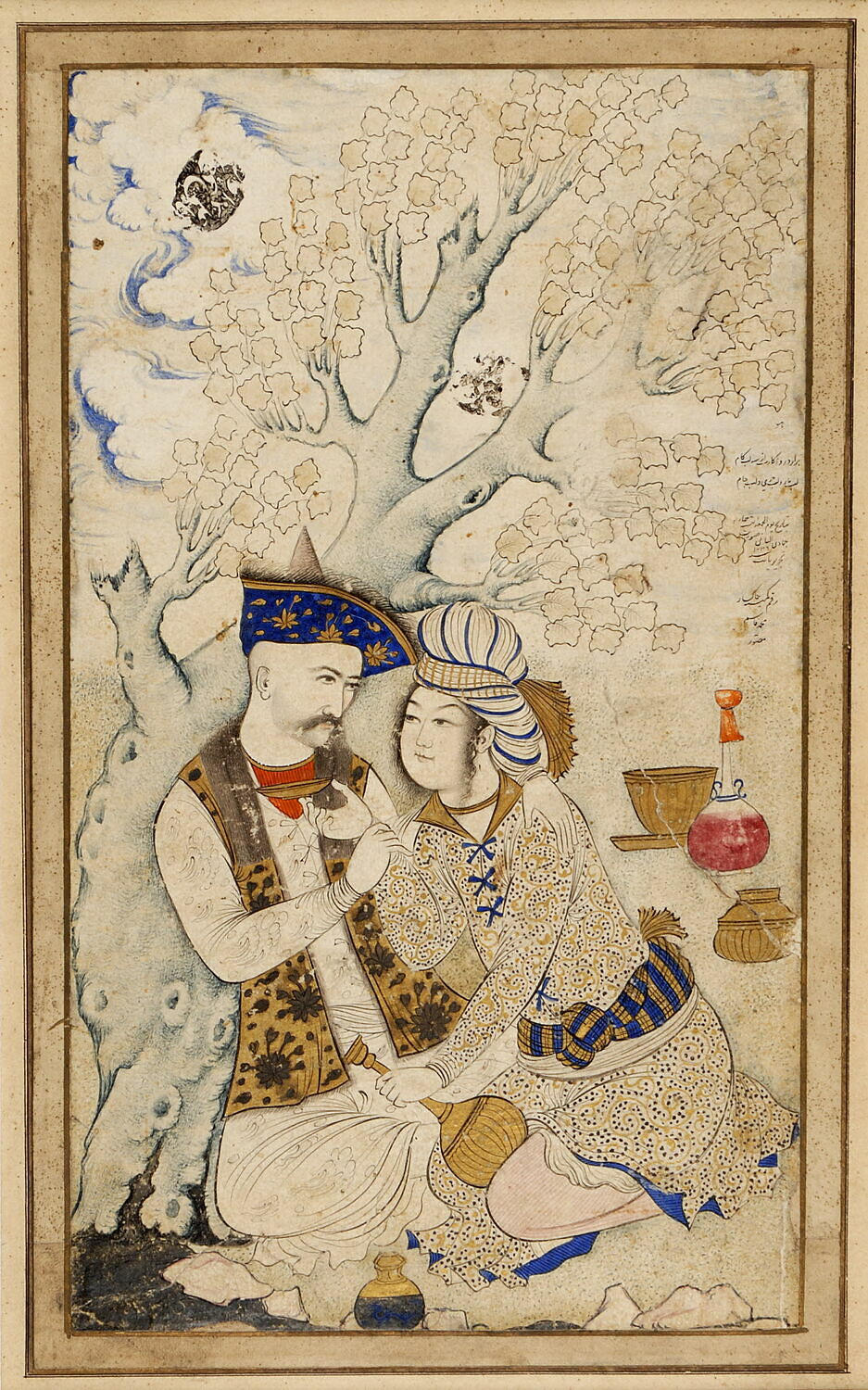
Abbas the Great of Iran with a page (1627), Persian miniature by Muhammad Qasim in the Louvre Museum; European travellers who had visited Iran during the reign of Shah Abbas have spoken of his strong desire for charming young pages and cup-bearers.

There is little evidence for homosexual practice in Islamic societies for the first century and a half of the Islamic era. Homoerotic poetry appears suddenly at the end of the 8th century CE, particularly in Baghdad in the work of Abu Nuwas (756–814), who became a master of all the contemporary genres of Arabic poetry. The famous author Jahiz tried to explain the abrupt change in attitudes toward homosexuality after the Abbasid Revolution by the arrival of the Abbasid army from Khorasan, who are said to have consoled themselves with male pages when they were forbidden to take their wives with them. According to numerous contemporaneous authors, the increased prosperity following the early conquests was accompanied by a supposed "corruption of morals" in the two holy cities of Mecca and Medina; Bosworth and others infer that homosexual practice became more widespread during this time as a result of acculturation to foreign customs, such as the music and dance practiced by mukhannathun, who were mostly foreign in origin, while other authors claim this process was related to interfaith dialogue, especially in and around Transoxiana.

The following centuries witnessed a continuation of this trend. The Abbasid caliphate Al-Amin (r. 809–813) was said to have required slave women to be dressed in masculine clothing so he could be persuaded to have sex with them, and a broader fashion for ghulamiyyat (boy-like girls) is reflected in literature of the period. Religious scholars were also influenced by this environment, but to a lesser extent; Chief Judge of the Abbasid Caliphate Yahya ibn Aktham permitted homosexual acts, despite being harsh on other sexual acts such as fornication. This had proved controversial with a writer, Abi Salma, who wrote "we had hoped to see justice apparent, but our implorations ended in despair, for, can the world and its people come to any good when the Grand Judge of Muslims sodomizes (yaluṯu)?" Later on, in an eleventh-century discussion among the scholars of Baghdad, some scholars who showed traits of bisexuality argued that it is natural for a man to desire anal intercourse with a fellow man, but this would only be allowed in the afterlife. Similarly, El-Rouayheb suggests that as Islamic orthodoxy stabilized and religious scholars considered sodomy as an abhorrent sin more or less without exception, most of them did not believe that this prohibition covered falling in love or writing poetry.

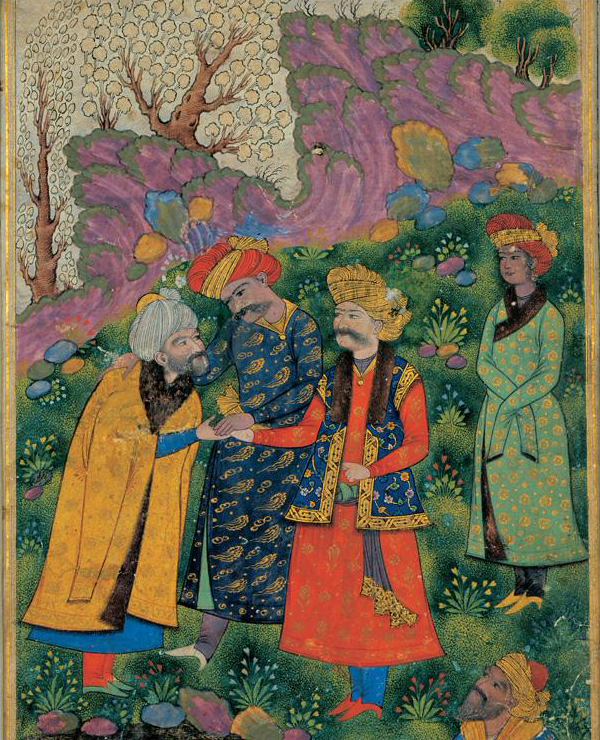
Mahmud of Ghazni (in red robe), shaking hands with a sheikh, with his companion Malik Ayaz standing behind him (1515)

The conceptions of homosexuality found in classical Islamic texts resembled the traditions of classical Greece and those of ancient Rome, rather than the modern understanding of sexual orientation. In earlier texts, it was expected that many mature men would be sexually attracted to both women and adolescent boys (with a supposed 'ideal' beginning at the age of fourteen and lasting until the growth of a full beard), and such men were expected to wish to play only an active role in homosexual intercourse once they reached adulthood. These norms were not static, however; while the growth of a beard was considered to be the conventional age when an adolescent lost his homoerotic appeal in earlier periods, the age of the stereotypical beloved became less restricted during later periods. This prototype was often represented in Persian poetry by Turkic slave-soldiers in most cases considerably older than the supposed 'ideal age', and was also illustrated by the story of Mahmud of Ghazni (971–1030), the ruler of the Ghaznavid Empire, and his cupbearer Malik Ayaz.

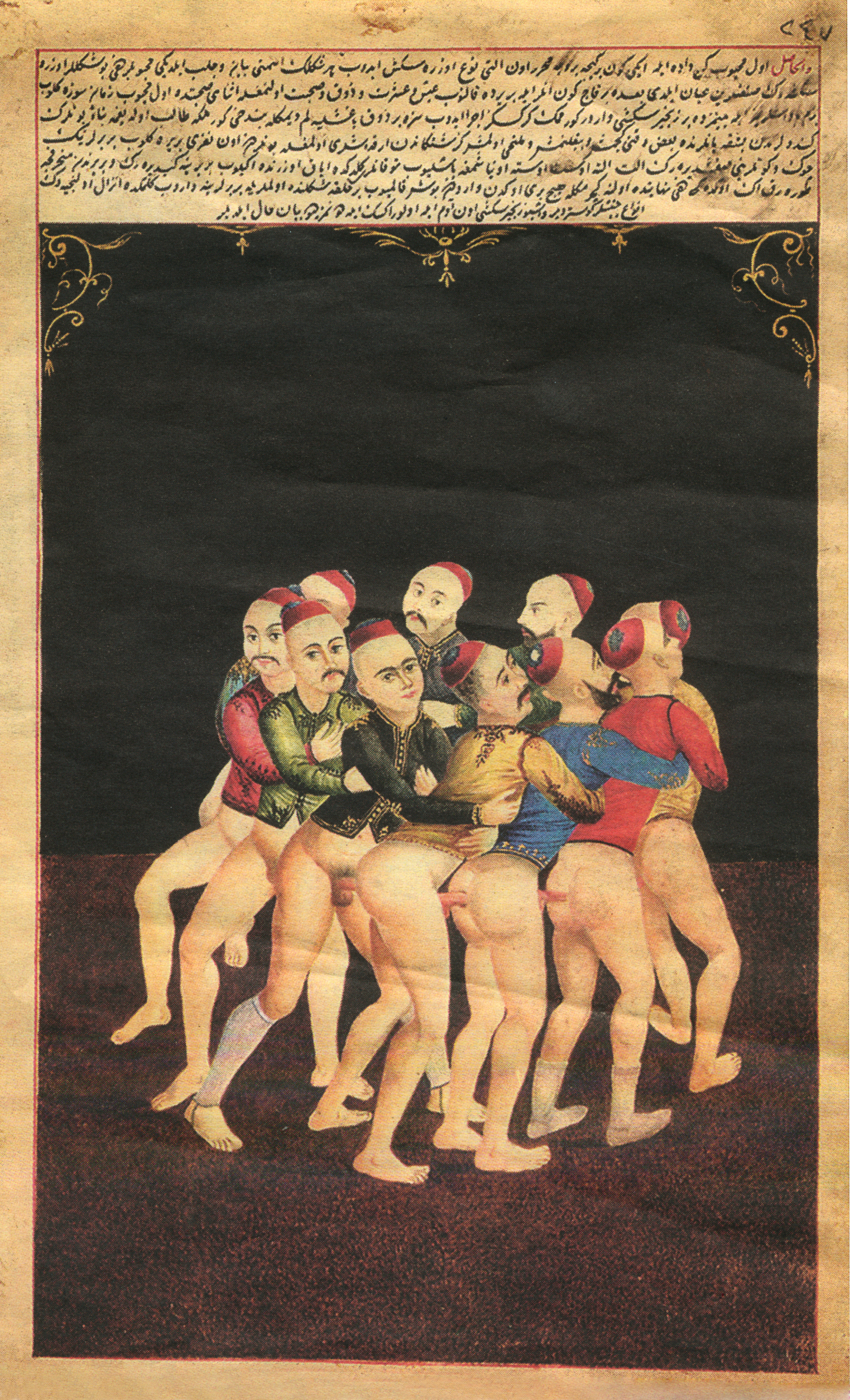
Illustration from Tuhfet ul-Mulk, an Ottoman manuscript from 1773

While classical texts and poetry covered homoeroticism in a restricted fashion, many authors argue that in many periods, the permissiveness and egalitarianism in the discourse of same-sex relations varied from one context to another. Murray argues that despite the normative nature of a restrictive pederastic discourse in courtly settings, egalitarian same-sex relations did happen; and furthermore, Rowson points out that male authors writing about sex seem to have been relatively ambivalent about female same-sex relations. Speaking for the lands of the Ottoman Empire specifically, Ze'evi claims that the stigma attached to adult passive partners common in the Golden Age seems to be suspiciously absent from Ottoman medical treatises; and further argues that, with the exception of a far more male-centered, patriarchal voice, colloquial Ottoman sexual discourse would "to us (...) be more akin to latter-day television series such as Sex and the City or Will and Grace than to most nineteenth-and twentieth-century sexual discourse."

In turn, more open discussions of sexuality during these times can be found in numerous contexts. The compendiums of both folk and classical poetry and song compiled by Ali Ufkî, contains numerous songs and poems related to male and female same-sex love, at least in one case in an egalitarian context. The works of Enderunlu Fazıl similarly covers both male and female same-sex love in a much less age-segragated fashion. Nedîm, the famed Ottoman poet, seems to have freely talked about love with older men, as he made frequent mention of beards in his Turkish and Persian poetry. Similarly, shadow play often represented female same-sex love as well as one of the main characters, Karagöz, switching between active and passive roles. As for Central Asian examples, Babur, Timurid prince and founder of the Mughal Empire, has written in his memoirs about a young male lover named Baburi. It is most likely that they were in similar ages, as Babur was in his teenage years, given the time of the account.

Despite these exceptions in certain settings and periods however, homosexual practices present in courtly and 'respectable' settings in the Islamic world remained largely age-segregated. In the medical tradition, seeking to play a passive role was considered both unnatural and shameful for a mature man, and following Greek precedents, the Islamic world regarded this as pathological. Therefore, the medical term ubnah was used for the desire of a man to exclusively be on the receiving end of anal intercourse. Physicians that theorized on ubnah includes Rhazes, who thought that it was correlated with small genitals and that a treatment was possible provided that the subject was deemed to be not too effeminate and the behavior not "prolonged". Dawud al-Antaki, in contrast, advanced that it could have been caused by an acidic substance embedded in the veins of the anus, causing itchiness and thus the need to seek relief.

=== Modern era ===
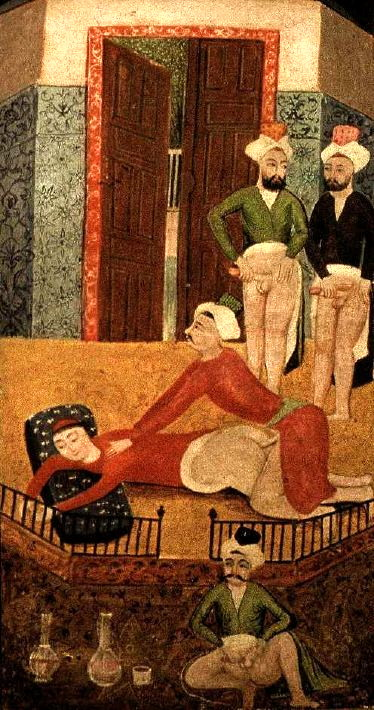
Ottoman illustration depicting a young man used for group sex (from Sawaqub al-Manaquib), 19th century

The 18th and 19th centuries saw the rise of Islamic fundamentalism such as Wahhabism, which came to call for stricter adherence to the Hadith. In 1744, Muhammad bin Saud, the tribal ruler of the town of Diriyah, endorsed ibn Abd al-Wahhab's mission and the two swore an oath to establish a state together run according to what they considered to be true Islamic principles. For the next seventy years, until the dismantlement of the first state in 1818, the Wahhabis dominated from Damascus to Baghdad. Homosexuality, which had been largely tolerated in the Ottoman Empire, became criminalized under the Wahhabis, and those found guilty were thrown to their deaths from the top of the minarets.

A few decades later, in 1858, the Tanzimat reforms took effect in the Ottoman Empire. These reforms, in total, nullified much of the earlier legal systems' rulings. As a ruling on homosexuality was not included in the new sets of laws, the Ottomans had effectively annulled any prohibition of homosexuality, theoretical or otherwise. However, many authors claim that the effects of this reformist period were the repression, not further acceptance, of same-sex relations: Özsoy writes that before the 19th-century, Ottoman society had not effectively criminalized homosexuality to begin with, and Lapidus and Salaymeh claim that by the 1850s, via European influence, they began censoring same-sex relations that they had once seen as relatively normative.

According to Dror Ze'evi, these repressive processes shaped the nineteenth century in the Ottoman Empire, resulting in the reinterpretation of local cultural material and traditions. Ze'evi traces these processes to European travelers denouncing the Ottomans for their ostensibly 'corrupt' sexual proclivities, and Ze'evi argues that the literate classes of the empire responded by 'reinventing' their own sexual norms. A new discourse of an idealized, heteronormative Ottoman world that surpassed Europe in its ostensible sexual 'morality' was the product of this process, with local practices and discourses actively suppressed to align with this invented tradition. In terms of same-sex relations specifically, Ahmed Cevdet Pasha stated, at the time:

"Woman-lovers (zendost) have increased in number, while boy-beloveds (mahbub) have decreased. It is as if the People of Lot have been swallowed by the earth. The love and affinity that were, in Istanbul, notoriously and customarily directed towards young men have now been redirected towards girls, in accordance with the state of nature."

With reference to the Muslim world more broadly, Tilo Beckers claims that while "endogenous changes" that sought to reinterpret religious and cultural texts were influential in the shift of attitudes seen in the 19th century Muslim world, "exogenous changes" from European countries also defined new social attitudes in the Muslim world. Bauer similarly writes that "although contemporary Islamist movements decry homosexuality as a form of Western decadence, the current prejudice against it among Muslim publics stems from an amalgamation of traditional Islamic legal theory with popular notions that were imported from Europe during the colonial era." In some Muslim-majority countries, current anti-LGBTQ laws were directly enacted by United Kingdom or Soviet organs and retained following independence. The 1860 Indian Penal Code, which included an anti-sodomy statute, was used as a basis of penal laws in other parts of the empire.

=== Contemporary developments ===
More recently, persecution of LGBTQ+ people have also been exacerbated by a rise in Islamic fundamentalism and the emergence of the gay-rights movement in the West, which allowed Islamists to paint homosexuality as a noxious Western import. Dynes and Donaldson point out that North African countries under French colonial tutelage lacked anti-sodomy statutes in their colonial laws, and that their anti-LGBTQ laws were only born afterwards, with the full weight of modern Muslim public opinion descending on those who, on the model of the gay liberationists of the West, would seek to make "homosexuality" (above all, adult men taking passive roles) publicly respectable.

Recent developments in many countries mirror this trend. In some countries like Iran and Iraq, the dominant discourse is that Western imperialism has spread homosexuality. In Iran, several hundred political opponents were executed in the aftermath of the 1979 Islamic Revolution and justified it by accusing them of homosexuality. Homosexual intercourse became a capital offense in Iran's Islamic Penal Code in 1991. Though the grounds for execution in Iran are difficult to track, there is evidence that several people were hanged for homosexual behavior in 2005–2006 and in 2016, mostly in cases of dubious charges of rape. In Iraq, where homosexuality is legal, the breakdown of law and order following the Second Gulf War allowed Islamist militias and vigilantes to act on their prejudice against gay people, with ISIS gaining particular notoriety for the gruesome acts of anti-LGBTQ violence committed under its rule of parts of Syria and Iraq. In Egypt, though, again, homosexuality is not explicitly criminalized, it has been widely prosecuted under vaguely formulated "morality" laws. Under the current rule of Abdel Fattah el-Sisi, arrests of LGBTQ individuals have risen fivefold, apparently reflecting an effort to appeal to conservatives. In Uzbekistan, an anti-sodomy law, passed after World War II with the goal of increasing the birth rate, was invoked in 2004 against a gay rights activist, who was imprisoned and subjected to extreme abuse.

== Scripture and Islamic jurisprudence ==
=== Same-sex relations ===
==== In the Quran ====
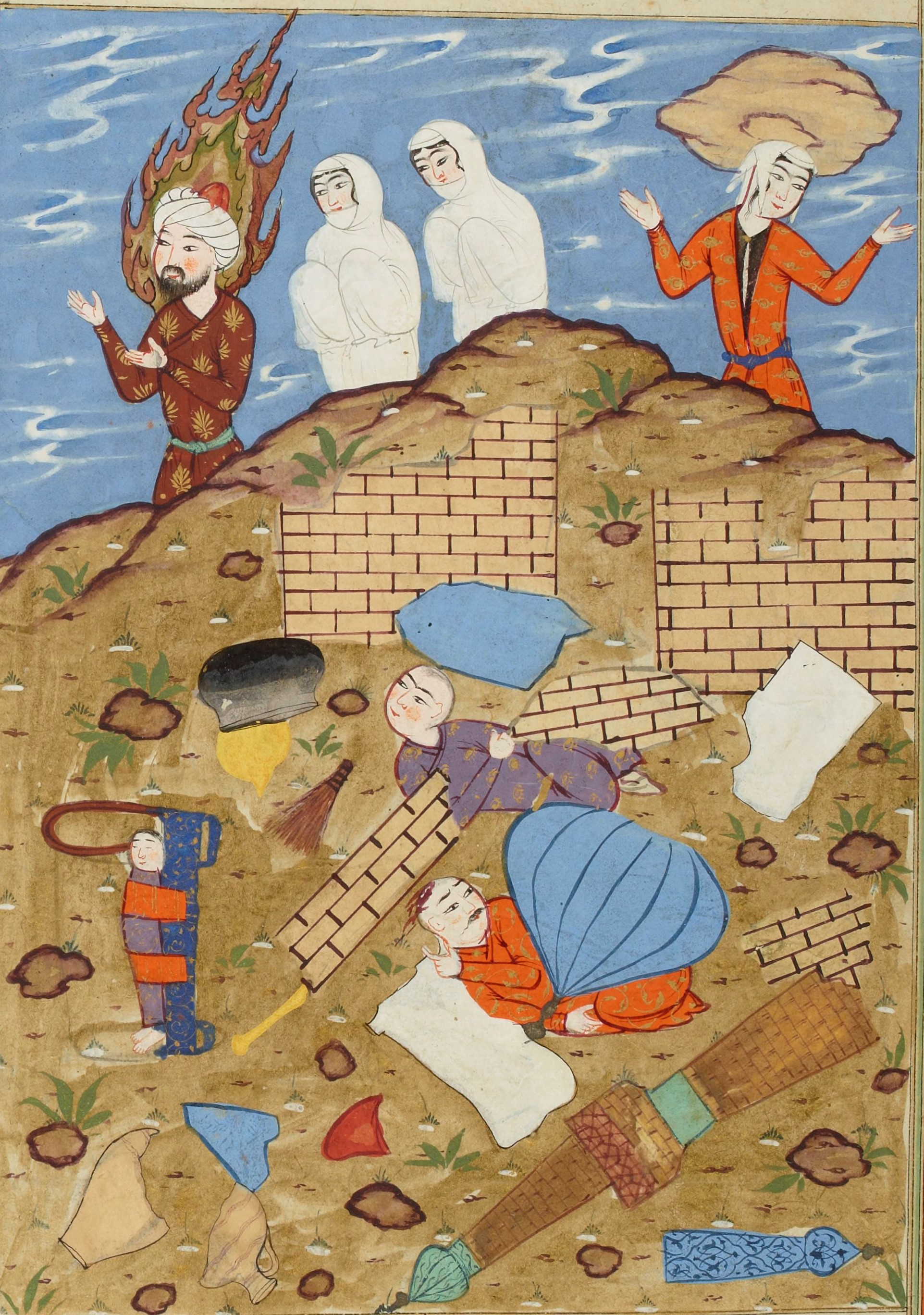
Lut fleeing the city with his daughters; his wife is killed by a rock. Persian miniature (16th century), National Library of France, Paris.

The Quran contains several ostensible allusions to homosexual activity, which has prompted considerable exegetical and legal commentaries over the centuries. The subject is most clearly addressed in the story of Sodom and Gomorrah (seven verses) after the men of the city demand to have sex with the male messengers sent by God to Lot (or Lut). The Quranic narrative largely conforms to that found in Genesis. In one passage the Quran says that the men "solicited his guests of him" (Quran 54:37), using an expression that parallels phrasing used to describe the attempted seduction of Joseph, and in multiple passages they are accused of "coming with lust" to men instead of women (or their wives). The Quran terms this lewdness or fahisha (Arabic: فاحشة, romanized: fāḥiša) unprecedented in the history of the world:

And ˹remember˺ when Lot scolded ˹the men of˺ his people, ˹saying,˺ "Do you commit a shameful deed that no man has ever done before? You lust after men instead of women! You are certainly transgressors." But his people’s only response was to say, "Expel them from your land! They are a people who wish to remain chaste!" So We saved him and his family except his wife, who was one of the doomed. We poured upon them a rain ˹of brimstone˺. See what was the end of the wicked!

— Surah Al-A'raf 7:80-84

The destruction of the "people of Lut" is generally thought to be explicitly associated with their sexual practices. Later exegetical literature built on these verses as writers attempted to give their own views as to what went on; and there was general agreement among exegetes that the "lewdness" alluded to by the Quranic passages was attempted sodomy, specifically anal intercourse.

Some Muslim scholars, however, such as the Ẓāhirī scholar (literalist) ibn Ḥazm, argued that the "people of Lut" were destroyed not because of participation in homosexuality per se, but because of disregarding prophets and messengers and attempting to rape one of them.

Nevertheless, the sins of the "people of Lut" (Arabic: لوط) subsequently became proverbial and the Arabic words for the act of anal sex between men such as liwat (Arabic: لواط, romanized: liwāṭ) and for a person who performs such acts (Arabic: لوطي, romanized: lūṭi) both derive from his name, although Lut was not the one demanding sex.

===== Zina verse =====
Only one passage in the Quran prescribes a strictly legal position. It is not restricted to homosexual behaviour, however, and deals more generally with zina (illicit sexual intercourse):

˹As for˺ those of your women who commit illegal intercourse—call four witnesses from among yourselves. If they testify, confine the offenders to their homes until they die or Allah ordains a ˹different˺ way for them. And the two among you who commit this sin—discipline them. If they repent and mend their ways, relieve them. Surely Allah is ever Accepting of Repentance, Most Merciful.

— Surah An-Nisa 4:15-16

In the exegetical Islamic literature, this verse has provided the basis for the view that Muhammad took a lenient approach towards male homosexual practices. The Orientalist scholar Pinhas Ben Nahum has argued that "it is obvious that the Prophet viewed the vice with philosophic indifference. Not only is the punishment not indicated—it was probably some public reproach or insult of a slight nature—but mere penitence sufficed to escape the punishment". Most exegetes hold that these verses refer to illicit heterosexual relationships, although a minority view attributed to the Mu'tazilite scholar Abu Muslim al-Isfahani interpreted them as referring to homosexual relations. This view was widely rejected by medieval scholars, but has found some acceptance in modern times.

===== Cupbearers in paradise =====
Some Quranic verses describing the Islamic paradise refer to perpetually youthful attendants which inhabit it, and they are described as both male and female servants: the females are referred to as ḥūr, whereas the males are referred to as ghilmān, wildān, and suqāh. The slave boys are referred to in the Quran as "immortal boys" (56:17, 76:19) or "young men" (52:24) who serve wine and meals to the blessed. Although the tafsir literature does not interpret this as a homoerotic allusion, the connection was made in other literary genres, mostly humorously. For example, the Abbasid-era poet Abu Nuwas wrote:

A beautiful lad came carrying the wine
With smooth hands and fingers dyed with henna
And with long hair of golden curls around his cheeks ...
I have a lad who is like the beautiful lads of paradise

And his eyes are big and beautiful

Jurists of the Hanafi school took up the question seriously, considering, but ultimately rejecting the suggestion that homosexual pleasures were, like wine, forbidden in this world but enjoyed in the afterlife. Ibn 'Âbidîn's Hâshiya refers to a debate among the scholars of Baghdad in the eleventh century, where some scholars argued in favor of that analogy.

==== In the hadith ====
The hadith (sayings and actions attributed to Muhammad) show that homosexual behaviour was not unknown in seventh-century Arabia. However, given that the Quran did not specify the punishment of homosexual practices, Islamic jurists increasingly turned to several "more explicit" hadiths in an attempt to find guidance on appropriate punishment.

From Abu Musa al-Ash'ari, the Prophet states that: "If a woman comes upon a woman, they are both adulteresses, if a man comes upon a man, then they are both adulterers."

— Al-Tabarani in al-Mu‘jam al-Awat: 4157, Al-Bayhaqi, Su‘ab al-Iman: 5075

While there are no reports relating to homosexuality in the best known and authentic hadith collections of Sahih al-Bukhari and Sahih Muslim, other canonical collections record a number of condemnations of the "act of the people of Lut" (male-to-male anal intercourse).

According to Oliver Leaman, hadiths seem to permit homoerotic feelings as long as they are not translated into action. However, in one hadith attributed to Muhammad himself, which exists in multiple variants, the Islamic prophet acknowledged homoerotic temptation towards young boys and warned his Companions against it: "Do not gaze at the beardless youths, for verily they have eyes more tempting than the houris" or "... for verily they resemble the houris". These beardless youths are also described as wearing sumptuous robes and having perfumed hair. Consequently, Islamic religious leaders, skeptical of Muslim men's capacity of self-control over their sexual urges, have forbidden looking and yearning both at males and females. In addition, there is a number of "purported (but mutually inconsistent) reports" (athar) of punishments of sodomy ordered by some of the early caliphs. Abu Bakr apparently recommended toppling a wall on the culprit, or else burning him alive, while Ali ibn Abi Talib is said to have ordered death by stoning for one sodomite and had another thrown head-first from the top of the highest building in the town; according to Ibn Abbas, the latter punishment must be followed by stoning.

There are, however, fewer hadith mentioning homosexual behaviour in women; and punishment (if any) for lesbianism was not clarified.

==== In traditional jurisprudence ====
The scarcity of concrete prescriptions from hadith and the contradictory nature of information about the actions of early authorities resulted in the lack of agreement among classical jurists as to how homosexual activity should be treated. Classical Islamic jurists did not deal with homosexuality as a sexual orientation, since the latter concept is modern and has no equivalent in traditional law, which dealt with it under the technical terms of liwat and zina.

Broadly, traditional Islamic law took the view that homosexual activity could not be legally sanctioned because it takes place outside religiously recognised marriages. All major schools of Islamic law considered liwat (anal sex) as a punishable offence, and most legal schools treated homosexual intercourse with penetration similarly to unlawful heterosexual intercourse under the rubric of zina. From a practical standpoint, however, as a hadd punishment for zina requires testimony from four witnesses of the actual act of penetration or a confession from the accused repeated four times, the legal criteria for the prescribed punishments for homosexual acts were very difficult to fulfill in the pre-modern period. The debates of classical jurists were, therefore, "to a large extent theoretical, since homosexual relations have always been tolerated" in pre-modern Islamic societies. While it is difficult to determine to what extent the legal sanctions were enforced in different times and places, historical record suggests that the laws were invoked mainly in cases of rape or other "exceptionally blatant infringement on public morals".

Beyond these practical caveats, there were differences of opinion with respect to methods of punishment, if and when legal action was taken. Some legal schools "prescribed capital punishment for sodomy, but others opted only for a relatively mild discretionary punishment." The Hanbalites are the most severe among Sunni schools, insisting on capital punishment for anal sex in all cases, while the other schools generally restrict punishment to flagellation with or without banishment, unless the culprit is muhsan (Muslim free married adult), and Hanafis often suggest no physical punishment at all, leaving the choice to the judge's discretion. The founder of the Hanafi school Abu Hanifa refused to recognize the analogy between sodomy and zina, although his two principal students disagreed with him on this point. For unclear reasons, the treatment of homosexuality in Twelver Shi'ism jurisprudence is generally harsher than in Sunni fiqh, while Zaydi and Isma'ili Shia jurists took positions similar to the Sunnis.

Where capital punishment is prescribed and a particular method is recommended, the methods range from stoning (Hanbali, Maliki), to the sword (some Hanbalites and Shafi'ites), or leaving it to the court to choose between several methods, including throwing the culprit off a high building (Shi'ite). Where flogging is prescribed, there is a tendency for indulgence and some recommend that the prescribed penalty should not be applied in full, with Ibn Hazm reducing the number of strokes to 10. There was debate as to whether the active and passive partners in anal sex should be punished equally.

Beyond penetrative anal sex, there was "general agreement" that "other homosexual acts (including any between females) were lesser offenses, subject only to discretionary punishment." Some jurists viewed sexual intercourse as possible only for an individual who possesses a phallus; hence those definitions of sexual intercourse that rely on the entry of as little of the corona of the phallus into a partner's orifice. Since women do not possess a phallus and cannot have intercourse with one another, they are, in this interpretation, physically incapable of committing zinā.

=== Gender-variant people ===
In Classical Arabic and Islamic literature, the plural term mukhannathun (singular: mukhannath) was a term used to describe gender-variant people, and it has typically referred to effeminate men or people with ambiguous sexual characteristics, who appeared feminine and functioned sexually or socially in roles typically carried out by women. According to the Iranian scholar Mehrdad Alipour, "in the premodern period, Muslim societies were aware of five manifestations of gender ambiguity: This can be seen through figures such as the khasi (eunuch), the hijra, the mukhannath, the mamsuh and the khuntha (hermaphrodite/intersex)." Gender specialists Aisya Aymanee M. Zaharin and Maria Pallotta-Chiarolli give the following explanation of the meaning of the term mukhannath and its derivate Arabic forms in the hadith literature:

Various academics such as Alipour (2017) and Rowson (1991) point to references in the Hadith to the existence of mukhannath: a man who carries femininity in his movements, in his appearance, and in the softness of his voice. The Arabic term for a trans woman is mukhannith as they want to change their sex characteristics, while mukhannath presumably do not/have not. The mukhannath or effeminate man is obviously male, but naturally behaves like a female, unlike the khuntha, an intersex person, who could be either male or female. Ironically, while there is no obvious mention of mukhannath, mukhannith, or khuntha in the Qur’ān, this holy book clearly recognizes that there are some people, who are neither male nor female, or are in between, and/or could also be "non-procreative" [عَقِيم] (Surah 42 Ash-Shuraa, verse 49–50).

Moreover, within Islam, there is a tradition of the elaboration and refinement of extended religious doctrines through scholarship. This doctrine contains a passage by the scholar and hadith collector An-Nawawi:

A mukhannath is the one ("male") who carries in his movements, in his appearance and in his language the characteristics of a woman. There are two types; the first is the one in whom these characteristics are innate, he did not put them on by himself, and therein is no guilt, no blame and no shame, as long as he does not perform any (illicit) act or exploit it for money (prostitution etc.). The second type acts like a woman out of immoral purposes and he is the sinner and blameworthy.

The hadith collection of Bukhari (compiled in the 9th century from earlier oral traditions) includes a report regarding mukhannathun, effeminate men who were granted access to secluded women's quarters and engaged in other non-normative gender behavior.

Another hadith also mention the punishment of banishment, both in connection with Umm Salama's servant and a man who worked as a musician. Muhammad described the musician as a mukhannath and threatened to banish him if he did not end his unacceptable career.

According to Everett K. Rowson, professor of Middle Eastern and Islamic Studies at New York University, none of the sources state that Muhammad banished more than two mukhannathun, and it is not clear to what extent the action was taken because of their breaking of gender rules in itself or because of the "perceived damage to social institutions from their activities as matchmakers and their corresponding access to women".

=== Other sexual identities ===
By and large, scholarly discourse of sexual diversity in the Qur'an has largely focused on male same-sex acts, with comparatively little attention being given to other sexual identities. No verse in the Qur'an explicitly mentions identities such as lesbianism, bisexuality, or asexuality, and classical Islamic jurisprudence focuses more on specific sexual acts rather than sexual identities. Modern scholars note that premodern Islamic exegetical traditions lack the conceptual framework that corresponds to contemporary understandings of identity-based sexuality.

Some modern scholars such as Scott Kugle have focused on re-evaluating and reinterpreting Qur'anic verses historically associated with male same-sex acts, particularly with the story of the people of Lot. In a similar fashion, broader discussions of gender and sexuality in the Qur'an have focused more on women's rights, heteronormativity, and patriarchal systems rather than determining the Qur'an's stance on various sexual identities.

From this, academic engagement with sexual identities such as bisexuality or asexuality in Islamic exegesis is limited. Some scholars have suggested that the lack of landmark texts on these identities reflects the historical focus of Queer Qur'anic exegesis on homosexual acts and social regulation, which has left contemporary discussions of a wide range of sexual identities underdeveloped.

== Modern laws in Muslim-majority countries ==
Same-sex intercourse illegal: Death penalty Death penalty on books but not enforced Imprisonment Unenforced penalty

=== Criminalization ===
According to the International Lesbian and Gay Association (ILGA) seven countries retain capital punishment for homosexual behavior: Saudi Arabia, Yemen, Iran, Afghanistan, Mauritania, northern Nigeria, southern Somalia, and the United Arab Emirates. Afghanistan also has the death penalty for homosexuality since the 2021 Taliban takeover. In Qatar, Algeria, Uzbekistan, and the Maldives, homosexuality is punished with time in prison or a fine. This has led to controversy regarding Qatar, which hosted the 2022 FIFA World Cup. In 2010, human rights groups questioned the awarding of hosting rights to Qatar, due to concerns that gay football fans may be jailed. In response, Sepp Blatter, head of FIFA, joked that they would have to "refrain from sexual activity" while in Qatar. He later withdrew the remarks after condemnation from rights groups.

While Egypt does not have a de jure law explicitly criminalizing homosexual behavior, gay men (or people suspected of being gay) have been prosecuted under general public morality laws. (See Cairo 52.) "Sexual relations between consenting adult persons of the same sex in private are not prohibited as such. However, the Law on the Combating of Prostitution, and the law against debauchery have been used to imprison gay men in recent years." In 2019, an Egyptian TV host was sentenced to one year in prison on charges of promoting debauchery after interviewing a gay man.

The Sunni Islamist militant group and Salafi-jihadist terrorist organization ISIL/ISIS/IS/Daesh, which invaded and claimed parts of Iraq and Syria between 2014 and 2017, enacted the political and religious persecution of LGBT people and decreed capital punishment for them. ISIL/ISIS/IS/Daesh terrorists have executed more than two dozen men and women for suspected homosexual activity, including several thrown off the top of buildings in highly publicized executions.

In India, which has the third-largest Muslim population in the world, and where Islam is the largest minority religion, the largest Islamic seminary (Darul Uloom Deoband) has vehemently opposed recent government moves to abrogate and liberalize laws from the colonial era that banned homosexuality. As of September 2018, homosexuality is no longer a criminal act in India, and most of the religious groups withdrew their opposing claims against it in the Supreme Court.

In Iraq, homosexuality is allowed by the government, but terrorist groups often carry out illegal executions of gay people. Saddam Hussein was "unbothered by sexual mores". Ali Hili reports that "since the 2003 invasion more than 700 people have been killed because of their sexuality." He calls Iraq the "most dangerous place in the world for sexual minorities."

In Jordan, where homosexuality is legal, "gay hangouts have been raided or closed on bogus charges, such as serving alcohol illegally." Despite this legality, social attitudes towards homosexuality are still hostile and hateful.

In Pakistan, its law is a mixture of both British colonial law as well as Islamic law, both which prescribe criminal penalties for same-sex sexual acts. The Pakistan Penal Code of 1860, originally developed under colonial rule, punishes sodomy with a possible prison sentence. Yet, the more likely situation for gay and bisexual men is sporadic police fines, and jail sentences.

In Bangladesh, homosexual acts are illegal and punishable according to section 377. In 2009 and 2013, the Bangladeshi Parliament refused to overturn Section 377.

In Saudi Arabia, the maximum punishment for homosexual acts is public execution by beheading.

In Malaysia, homosexual acts are illegal and punishable with jail, fine, deportation, whipping or chemical castration. In October 2018, Prime Minister Mahathir Mohamad stated that Malaysia would not "copy" Western nations' approach towards LGBTQ rights, indicating that these countries were exhibiting a disregard for the institutions of the traditional family and marriage, as the value system in Malaysia is good. In May 2019, in response to the warning of George Clooney about intending to impose death penalty for homosexuals like Brunei, the Deputy Foreign Minister Marzuki Yahya pointed out that Malaysia does not kill gay people, and will not resort to killing sexual minorities. He also said, although such lifestyles deviate from Islam, the government would not impose such a punishment on the group.

Indonesia does not have a sodomy law and does not currently criminalize private, non-commercial homosexual acts among consenting adults, except in Aceh province where homosexuality is illegal for Muslims under Islamic Sharia law, and punishable by flogging. While it does not criminalise homosexuality, the country does not recognise same-sex marriage. In July 2015, the Minister of Religious Affairs stated that it is difficult in Indonesia to legalize Gay Marriage, because strongly held religious norms speak strongly against it. People's Representative Council (DPR) has dismissed the suggestion that the death penalty would be introduced for same-sex acts, citing that it is quite impossible to implement that policy by the government of Indonesia.

As the latest addition in the list of criminalizing Muslim countries, Brunei's has implemented penalty for homosexuals within Sharia Penal Code in stages since 2014. It prescribes death by stoning as punishment for sex between men, and sex between women is punishable by caning or imprisonment. The sultanate currently has a moratorium in effect on death penalty.

As of 2026, homosexuality is criminalized in 35 Muslim-majority countries, they are Afghanistan, Algeria, Bangladesh, Brunei, Burkina Faso, Chad, Comoros, Egypt, Gambia, Guinea, Iran, Iraq, Kuwait, Lebanon (de facto), Libya, Malaysia, Mali, Mauritania, Morocco, Niger, Nigeria, Oman, Pakistan, Qatar, Saudi Arabia, Senegal, Sierra Leone, Somalia, Sudan, Syria, Tunisia, Turkmenistan, United Arab Emirates, Uzbekistan, and Yemen. In Indonesia, homosexuality isn't criminalized, although there are severe prosecutions of homosexuals, especially in Aceh and South Sumatra. Since January 2026, Indonesia criminalized sex outside of marriage, and since same-sex marriage is banned, which will de facto criminalize homosexuality. In Gaza, the legality of male homosexuality is unclear. In Western Sahara, a disputed territory claimed by Morocco, homosexuality is criminalized. In recent years, the number of Muslim-majority countries that criminalize homosexuality has been increasing, with the most recent ones being Chad in 2017, Iraq and Mali in 2024, and Burkina Faso and Niger in 2025.

==== Death penalty ====
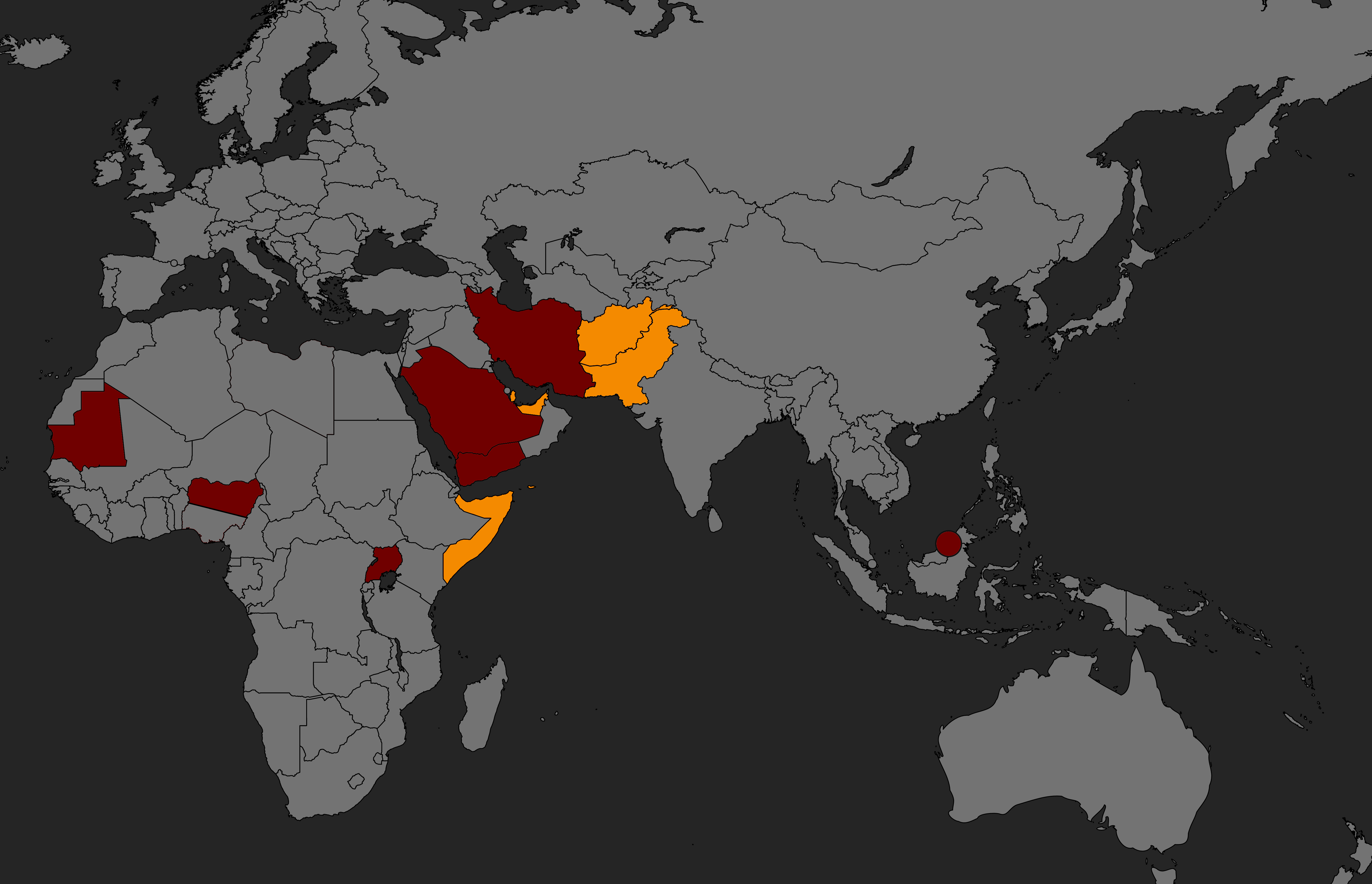
Law explicitly provides for death penalty for sex between consenting adults of the same sex. Law is unclear if death penalty is a legally possible punishment for same-sex acts, although such acts are criminalized. (Note: The ILGA, in its 2020 report and its 2023 database, state that there five UN-member countries where the status of the death penalty as a punishment for same-sex sexual conduct is uncertain. This may be because legal experts or scholars dispute the effect of legal provisions, or because the laws relied upon to potentially sanction the death penalty relate to sexual behaviours outside marriage, with applicability to homosexual relations so far only theoretical. The jurisdictions in this category are: Afghanistan, Pakistan, Qatar, Somalia (including Somaliland) and the United Arab Emirates.)

All nations currently having capital punishment as a potential penalty for homosexual activity are Muslim-majority countries and base those laws on interpretations of Islamic teachings, with the exception of Uganda. In 2020, the International Lesbian, Gay, Bisexual, Trans and Intersex Association (ILGA) released its most recent State Sponsored Homophobia Report. The report found that eleven countries or regions impose the death penalty for "same-sex sexual acts" with reference to sharia-based laws. In Iran, according to article 129 and 131 there are up to 100 lashes of whip first three times and fourth time death penalty for lesbians. The death penalty is implemented nationwide in Brunei, Iran, Saudi Arabia, Afghanistan, Yemen, northern Nigeria, Mauritania, the United Arab Emirates, and southern Somalia. This punishment is also allowed by the law but not implemented in Qatar and Pakistan; and was back then implemented through non-state courts by ISIS in parts of Iraq and Syria (now no longer existing).

Due to Brunei's law dictating that gay sex be punishable by stoning, many of its targeted citizens fled to Canada in hopes of finding refuge. The law is also set to impose the same punishment for adultery among heterosexual couples. Despite pushback from citizens in the LGBTQ+ community, Brunei prime minister's office produced a statement explaining Brunei's intention for carrying through with the law. It has been suggested that this is part of a plan to separate Brunei from the western world and towards a Muslim one.

In the Chechen Republic, a part of the Russian Federation, Ramzan Kadyrov has actively discriminated against homosexual individuals and presided over a campaign of arbitrary detention and extrajudicial killing. It has been suggested that "to counteract popular support for an Islamist insurgency that erupted after the Soviet breakup, President Vladimir V. Putin of Russia has granted wide latitude to Kadyrov to co-opt elements of the Islamist agenda, including an intolerance of gays." Reports of the discrimination in Chechnya have in turn been used to stoke Islamophobic, racist, and anti-Russia rhetoric. Jessica Stern, executive director of OutRight Action International, has criticized this bigotry, noting: "Using a violent attack on men accused of being gay to legitimize Islamophobia is dangerous and misleading. It negates the experiences of queer Muslims and essentializes all Muslims as homophobic. We cannot permit this tragedy to be co-opted by ethno-nationalists to perpetuate anti-Muslim or anti-Russian sentiment. The people and their government are never the same."

==== Minor penalty ====
In Algeria, Bangladesh, Chad, Morocco, Aceh, Maldives, Oman, Pakistan, Qatar, Syria, and Tunisia, it is illegal, and penalties may be imposed. In Kuwait, Sierra Leone, Turkmenistan, Uzbekistan, homosexual acts between males are illegal, but homosexual relations between females are legal.

=== Legalization ===
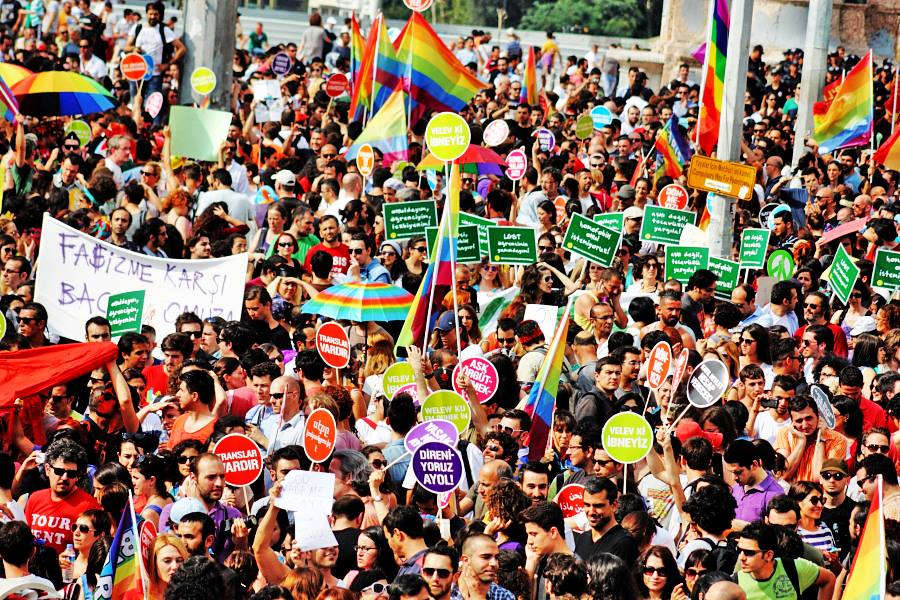
Istanbul LGBT Pride parade in 2013, Taksim Square, Istanbul, Turkey.

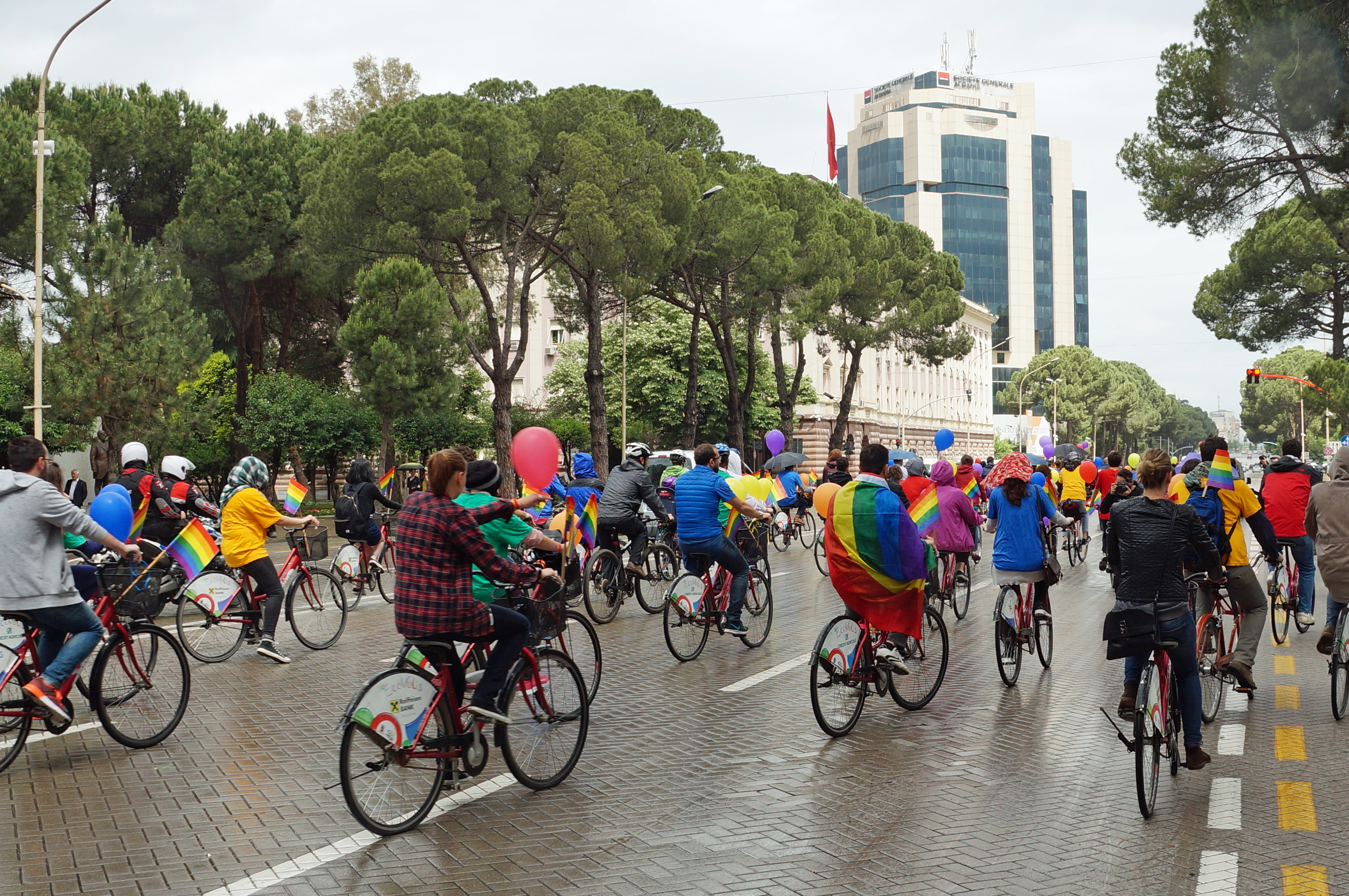
Gay Pride ride 2016 in Tirana, Albania.

Same-sex sexual intercourse is legal in Albania, Azerbaijan, Bahrain, Bosnia and Herzegovina, Côte d'Ivoire, Djibouti, Guinea-Bissau, Jordan, Kazakhstan, Kosovo, Kyrgyzstan, Tajikistan, Turkey, the West Bank (State of Palestine), Indonesia (de jure; except Aceh), and in Northern Cyprus. In Albania and Turkey, there have been discussions about legalizing same-sex marriage. However, while it is legal in these countries, censorship laws exist in most of them.

In Lebanon, courts have ruled that the country's penal code must not be used to target homosexuals, but the law has yet to be changed by parliament.

==== Discrimination protections ====
Under the UN administration, Kosovo became the first Muslim-majority country to enact anti-discriminatory protections based on sexual identity. In 2009, similar protections were introduced in Bosnia and Herzegovina. The next year, a law adopted by Albania prohibited discrimination for sexual orientation and gender identity.

Since early 2000s, thanks to the EU accession bid, LGBTQ+ rights reforms were brought into consideration in Turkey. In 2013, in the course of the legislative efforts for a constitutional amendment, the main opposition CHP proposed a draft to provide employment protections, which was subsequently approved by all major parties in the Turkish Parliament, including the ruling AKP. It, however, was never enacted following conflict in other clauses, and the subsequent democratic backsliding of Turkey shut the door to further improvements. Even though legal protections are absent, the local governments held by the Kemalist opposition are signatories to a variety of international agreements, and they pledge to indiscriminate in employment. Some municipalities even have dedicated bodies to ensure equity for LGBTQ+ individuals.

In 2014, the Turkish Republic of Northern Cyprus, albeit a non-recognized entity, made history by introducing employment protections based on sexual identity, in addition to gender, on the Penal Law.

==== Same-sex marriage ====
In 2007, there was a gay party in the Moroccan town of al-Qasr al-Kabir. Rumours spread that this was a gay marriage and more than 600 people took to the streets, condemning the alleged event and protesting against leniency towards homosexuals. Several persons who attended the party were detained and eventually six Moroccan men were sentenced to between four and ten months in prison for "homosexuality".

In France, there was an Islamic same-sex marriage on 18 February 2012. In November 2012 in Paris, a room in a Buddhist prayer hall was used by gay Muslims and called a "gay-friendly mosque". The French overseas department of Mayotte, which has a majority-Muslim population, legalized same-sex marriage in 2013, along with the rest of France.

The first American-Muslim in the United States Congress, Keith Ellison (D-MN) said in 2010 that all discrimination against LGBTQ people is wrong. He further expressed support for gay marriage stating:

"I believe that the right to marry someone who you please is so fundamental it should not be subject to popular approval any more than we should vote on whether blacks should be allowed to sit in the front of the bus."

In 2014, eight men were jailed for three years by a Cairo court after the circulation of a video of them allegedly taking part in a private wedding ceremony between two men on a boat on the Nile.

==== Transgender rights ====
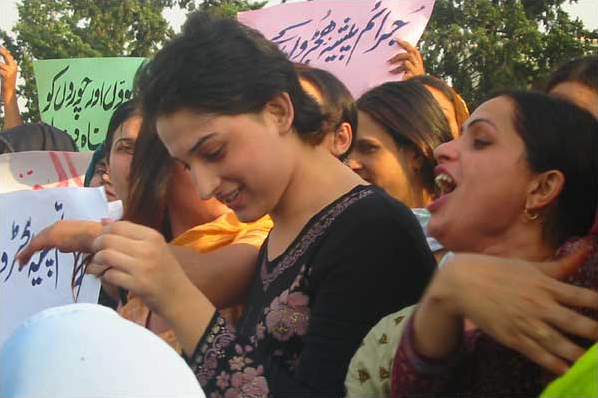
A group of hijras and transgender people protest in Islamabad, Pakistan.

In the late 1980s, Mufti Muhammad Sayyid Tantawi of Egypt issued a fatwa supporting the right for those who fit the description of mukhannathun and mukhannathin to have sex reassignment surgery; Ayatollah Ruhollah Khomeini of Iran issued similar fatwas around the same time. Khomeini's initial fatwa concerned intersex individuals as well, but he later specified that sex reassignment surgery was also permissible in the case of transgender individuals. Because homosexuality is illegal in Iran but gender transition is legal, some gay individuals have been forced to undergo sex reassignment surgery and transition into the opposite sex, regardless of their actual gender identity.

While Iran has outlawed homosexuality, Iranian thinkers such as Ayatollah Khomeini have allowed for transgender people to change their sex so that they can enter heterosexual relationships. Despite this, those who do not commit to reassignment surgery are not accepted to be trans. The government even provides up to half the cost for those needing financial assistance and a sex change is recognized on the birth certificate.

The secular yet Muslim majority country, Turkey, generally accepts gender adjustment surgery. Nonetheless, there is no financial support for transgender people and many transgender people are faced with prejudice.

On 26 June 2016, clerics affiliated to the Pakistan-based organization Tanzeem Ittehad-i-Ummat issued a fatwa on transgender people where a trans woman (born male) with "visible signs of being a woman" is allowed to marry a man, and a trans man (born female) with "visible signs of being a man" is allowed to marry a woman. Pakistani transgender persons can also change their (legal) sex. Muslim ritual funerals also apply. Depriving transgender people of their inheritance, humiliating, insulting or teasing them were declared haraam. In May 2018, the Pakistani parliament passed a bill giving transgender individuals the right to choose their legal sex and correct their official documents, such as ID cards, driver licenses, and passports. Today, transgender people in Pakistan have the right to vote and to search for a job free from discrimination. As of 2018, one transgender woman became a news anchor, and two others were appointed as Supreme Court clerks.

=== Summary table by country or territory ===
LGBTQ rights in:	Same-sex sexual activity	Recognition of same-sex unions	Same-sex marriage	Adoption by same-sex couples	LGBT people allowed to serve openly in military	Anti-discrimination laws concerning sexual orientation	Laws concerning gender identity/expression
Afghanistan	Illegal, death penalty						
Algeria	Illegal since 1966, up to 3 years in prison						
Azerbaijan	Legal since 2000						
Bahrain	Legal since 1976						/ Very limited. Court-ordered, long legal processes involved
Bangladesh	Illegal, life imprisonment						/ Only Hijras, recognized as third gender since 2014
Brunei	Illegal since 1906, death by stoning, 7 years in prison, lashes						
Burkina Faso	Illegal since 2025, 2 to 5 years in prison						
Chad	Illegal since 2017, 2 months to 5 years in prison						
Comoros	Illegal, up to 2 years in prison						
Djibouti	Not explicitly legal. Authorities can prosecute them under laws prohibiting acts contrary to "good morals"						
Egypt	Illegal (de facto), up to 17 years in prison						/ Sex reassignment surgery allowed, needs approval from Al-Azhar Mosque or the Coptic Orthodox Church of Alexandria
(The Gambia) Gambia	Illegal, life imprisonment						
Guinea	Illegal since 1988, up to 6 months to 10 years in prison						
Indonesia	/ Illegal in Aceh, up to 1.5 year imprisonment						Changing gender is legal; needs surgery and judicial approval
Iran	Illegal, punishments include death penalty, lashings, fines, prison						Sex reassignment surgery permitted since 1987
Iraq	Illegal since 2024, up to 15 years in prison				Banned since 2007		
Jordan	Legal since 1951						
Kazakhstan	Legal since 1998		Constitutional ban since 2026		Since 2022		Changing gender is legal since 2003; requires sex reassignment surgery, sterilisation, hormone therapy and medical examinations
Kuwait	Illegal for men, up to 7 years of imprisonment						
Lebanon	Law banning sexual acts "against nature" is used to prosecute it; up to 1 year in prison						
Libya	Illegal since 1953, up to 5 years in prison						
Malaysia	Illegal since 1871, up to 20 years in prison						
Maldives	Illegal, up to 8 years in prison, lashings						
Mali	Illegal since 2024, 2 to 7 years in prison				Constitutional ban since 2023		
Mauritania	Illegal since 1983, up to 2 years in prison, death penalty						
Morocco	Illegal since 1963, penalty of 6 months to 3 years of imprisonment						
Niger	Illegal since 2025, 5 to 10 years in prison						
Nigeria	Illegal since 1904, up to 14 years in prison in non-Sharia states; death penalty in Sharia states						
Oman	Illegal, up to 3 years to life imprisonment						
Pakistan	Illegal since 1947, up to 2 years to life imprisonment						Right to change gender is legal and third gender is recognized since 2010
Qatar	Illegal since 1938, up to 7 years in prison, fines, corporal punishment, deportation, death penalty						
(Sahrawi Arab Democratic Republic) Sahrawi Republic	Illegal since 1976						
Saudi Arabia	Illegal, death penalty						
Senegal	Illegal since 1966, up to 10 years of imprisonment	Constitutional ban since 2026	Constitutional ban since 2026				
Sierra Leone	Illegal for men, life imprisonment					In employement only, since 2023	
Somalia	Illegal since 1899, up to 3 years of imprisonment to death penalty						
Somaliland	Illegal since 1941, up to 3 years of imprisonment to death penalty						
Sudan	Illegal since 1991, up to 5 years to life imprisonment						
Syria	Illegal since 1949, up to 3 years of imprisonment						
Tajikistan	Legal since 1998						Changing gender is legal after surgery
Tanzania	Illegal since 1864, up to 30 years to life imprisonment						
Tunisia	Illegal since 1913, up to 3 years in prison						
Turkey	Legal since 1858						Changing gender is legal since 1988
Turkmenistan	Illegal for men since 1927, up to 5 years imprisonment						
Uzbekistan	Illegal for men since 1926, up to 3 years imprisonment						
Yemen	Illegal; lashes, prison and up to death penalty. Houthi-controlled Yemen, death penalty						

== Public opinion among Muslims ==
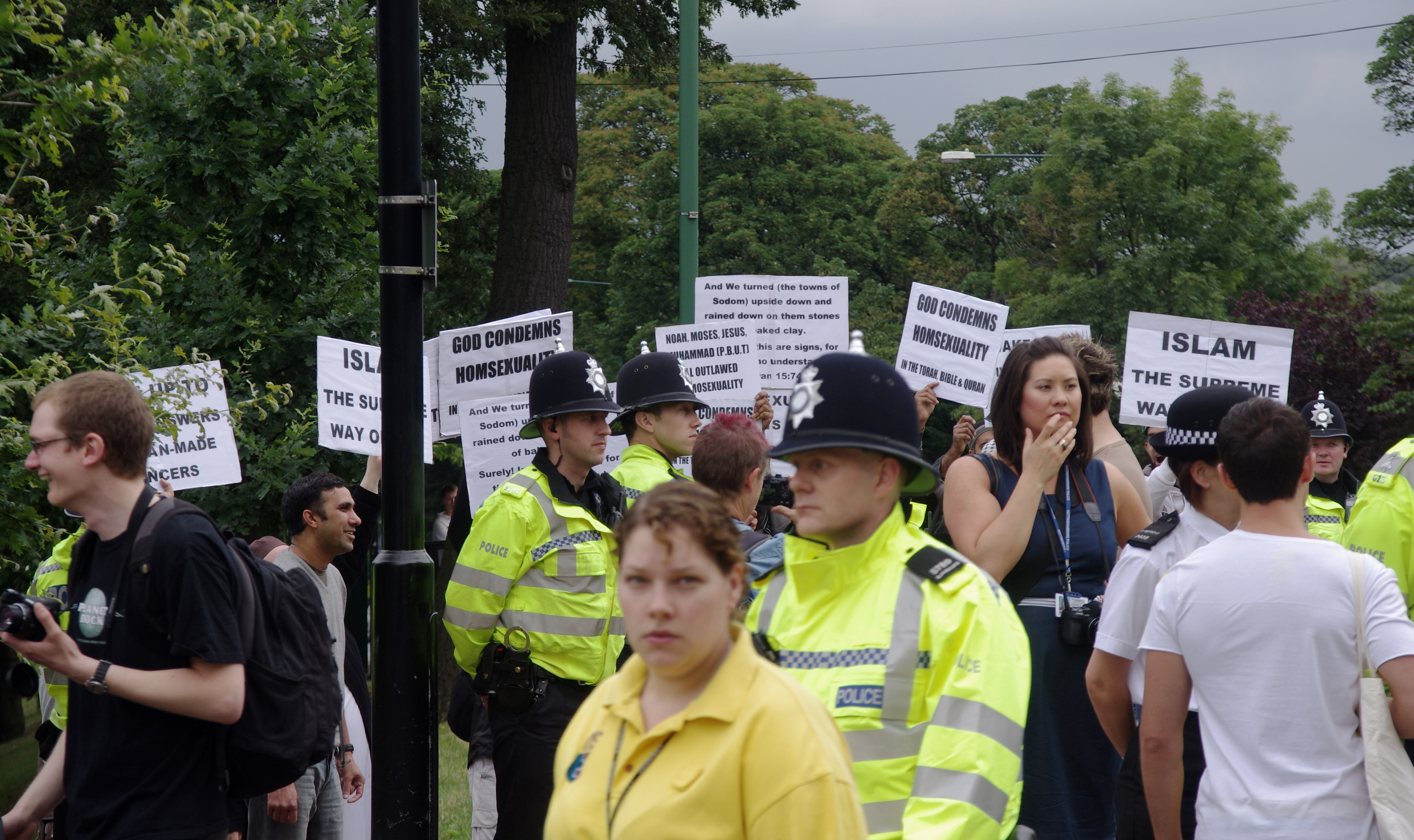
Muslim anti-LGBT protesters at an LGBT Pride march in Nottingham, England

=== Opinion polls ===
In 2013, the Pew Research Center conducted a study on the global acceptance of homosexuality and found a widespread rejection of homosexuality in many nations that are predominantly Muslim. In some countries, views were becoming more conservative among younger people.

2013 Pew Poll

Country	Age group		
Country	18–29	30–49	50+
Lebanon	27%	17%	10%
Turkey	9%	7%	10%
Malaysia	7%	10%	11%
Jordan	5%	1%	1%
Palestine	5%	3%	–
Senegal	5%	2%	2%
Indonesia	4%	2%	3%
Egypt	3%	2%	3%
Tunisia	3%	2%	1%
Pakistan	2%	2%	2%

2019 Arab Barometer Survey

Country	Acceptance of Homosexuality
Algeria	26%
Morocco	19%
Sudan	17%
Jordan	7%
Tunisia	7%
Lebanon	6%
Palestine territories	5%

- A 2007 survey of British Muslims showed that 61% believe homosexuality should be illegal. A later Gallup poll in 2009 showed that none of the 500 British Muslims polled believed homosexuality to be "morally acceptable". In a 2016 ICM poll of 1,081 British Muslims, 52% of those polled disagreed with the statement "Homosexuality should be legal in Britain" while 18% agreed. In the same poll, 56% of British Muslims polled disagreed with the statement "Gay marriage should be legal in Britain" compared with 20% of the control group and 47% disagreed with the statement "It is acceptable for a homosexual person to be a teacher in a school" compared with 14% of the control group.
- According to a 2012 poll, 51% of the Turks in Germany, who account for nearly two thirds of the total Muslim population in Germany, believed that homosexuality is an illness. However, a more recent poll from 2015 found that more than 60% of Muslims in Germany support gay marriage. A poll in 2017 also found 60% support for gay marriage.
- American Muslims – in line with general public attitudes in the United States – have become much more accepting of homosexuality over recent years. In a 2007 poll conducted by Pew Research Center, only 27% of American Muslims believed that homosexuality should be accepted. In a 2011 poll, that rose to 39%. In a July 2017 poll, Muslims who say homosexuality should be accepted by society clearly outnumber those who say it should be discouraged (52% versus 33%), a level of acceptance similar to American Protestants (52% in 2016). According to research by the Public Religion Research Institute's 2017 American Values Atlas, 51% of American Muslims favor same-sex marriage, while 34% are opposed.
- The 2009 Gallup poll showed that 35% of the French Muslims believed homosexuality to be "morally acceptable".
- A 2016 iVOX survey of Belgian Muslims found that 53% agreed with the statement: "I have no issues with homosexuality." Approximately 30% disagreed with the statement while the rest refused to answer or were unsure.
- A 2016 survey of Canadian Muslims showed that 36% agreed with the statement homosexuality should be accepted by society with 47% young Canadian Muslims (18–34) holding this belief. The survey also stated that 43% of Canadian Muslims agreed with the statement homosexuality should not be accepted by society. The Muslim groups that mostly opposed acceptance of homosexuality by society were the older age group 45 to 59 (55%) and the lowest income group <$30K (56%).
- Turkish Muslims: According to the survey conducted by the Kadir Has University in Istanbul in 2016, 33% of people said that LGBT people should have equal rights. This increased to 45% in 2020. Another survey by Kadir Has University in 2018 found that 55.3% of people would not want a homosexual neighbour. This decreased to 46.5% in 2019.

=== Muslim leaders ===
==== Sunni ====
- In 2017, the Egyptian cleric, Sheikh Yusuf al-Qaradawi (who has served as chairman of the European Council for Fatwa and Research) was asked how gay people should be punished. He replied that "there is disagreement", but "the important thing is to treat this act as a crime."

==== Shia ====
- Iran's former Supreme Leader, Ayatollah Ali Khamenei has stated that: "There is no worse form of moral degeneration than [homosexuality]. ... But it won't stop here. In the future, not sure exactly when, they will legalize incest and even worse." According to the conservative news website Khabaronline, Mohammad Javad Larijani, Khamenei's close adviser, stated "In our society, homosexuality is regarded as an illness and malady", and that "Promoting homosexuality is illegal and we have strong laws against it." He added, "It [homosexuality] is considered as a norm in the West and they are forcing us to accept it. We are strongly against this."
- Ayatollah Ali al-Sistani in Iraq has stated: "It is not permissible for a man to look at another man with lust; similarly, it is not permissible for a woman to look at another woman with lust. Homosexuality (Ash-shudhûdh al-jinsi) is haram. Similarly, it is forbidden for a female to engage in a sexual act with another female, i.e. lesbianism."

== LGBTQ-related movements within Islam ==
=== LGBTQ acceptance ===
The coming together of "human rights discourses and sexual orientation struggles" has resulted in an abundance of "social movements and organizations concerned with gender and sexual minority oppression and discrimination." Today, most LGBTQ-affirming Islamic organizations and individual congregations are primarily based in the Western world and South Asian countries; they usually identify themselves with the liberal and progressive movements within Islam.

In France there was an Islamic same-sex marriage on February 18, 2012. In Paris in November 2012 a room in a Buddhist prayer hall was used by gay Muslims and called a "gay-friendly mosque". The Ibn Ruschd-Goethe mosque in Berlin is a liberal mosque open to all types of Muslims, where men and women pray together and LGBTQ worshippers are welcomed and supported. Other significant LGBTQ-inclusive mosques or prayer groups include the El-Tawhid Juma Circle Unity Mosque in Toronto, Masjid an-Nur al-Isslaah (Light of Reform Mosque) in Washington, D.C., Unity Mosque in Atlanta, People's Mosque in Cape Town South Africa, Masjid Ul-Umam mosque in Cape Town, Al Ghurbaah mosque in South Africa, Qal'bu Maryamin in California, and the Nur Ashki Jerrahi Sufi Community in New York City.

Muslims for Progressive Values, based in the United States and Malaysia, is "a faith-based, grassroots, human rights organization that embodies and advocates for the traditional Qur'anic values of social justice and equality for all, for the 21st Century." The Mecca Institute is an LGBTQ-inclusive and progressive online Islamic seminary, and serves as an online center of Islamic learning and research.

==== Defunct movements ====
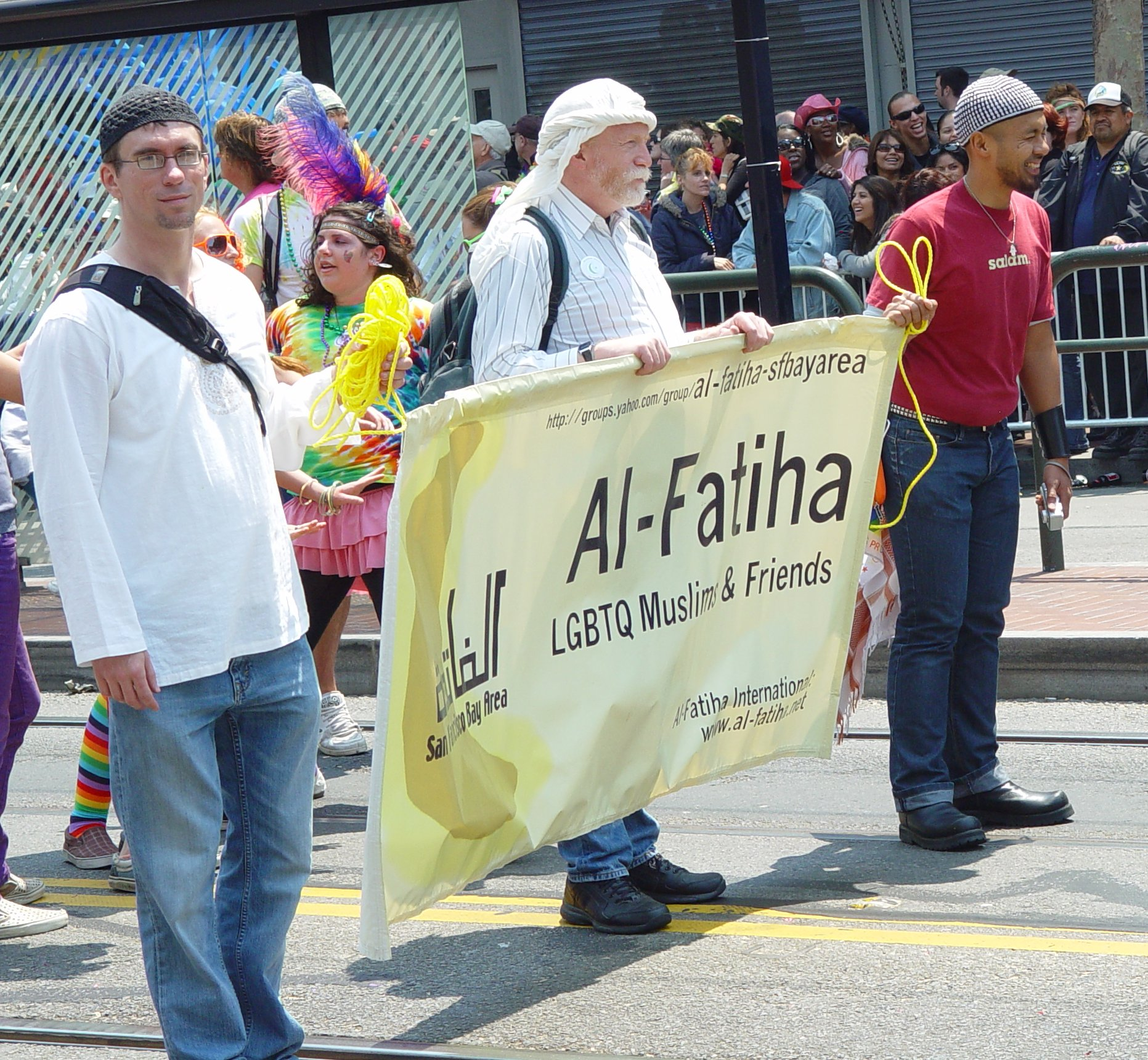
Members of Al Fatiha at the LGBT Pride parade in San Francisco 2008

The Al-Fatiha Foundation was an organization which tried to advance the cause of gay, lesbian, and transgender Muslims. It was founded in 1998 by Faisal Alam, a Pakistani American, and was registered as a nonprofit organization in the United States. The organization was an offshoot of an internet listserve that brought together many gay, lesbian and questioning Muslims from various countries.

==== Active movements ====
- In 1996, Muhsin Hendricks became the first openly gay imam and founded the inner circle, a support network aiding gay Muslims in coming to terms with their sexual orientation. In 2011, he founded Al Ghurbaah foundation.
- In 2011, Imam Daayiee Abdullah, one of America's first openly gay Imams, created an LGBTQ+ mosque, known as the Light of Reform Mosque, to provide members of the LGBTQ+ community with marriage ceremonies. Abdullah opened the Mecca Institute in an attempt to open at least 50 LGBTQ+ friendly mosques by 2030.
- In November 2012, a prayer room was set up in Paris by gay Islamic scholar and founder of the group 'Homosexual Muslims of France' Ludovic-Mohamed Zahed. It was described by the press as the first gay-friendly mosque in Europe. The reaction from the rest of the Muslim community in France has been mixed. The opening has been condemned by the Grand Mosque of Paris.

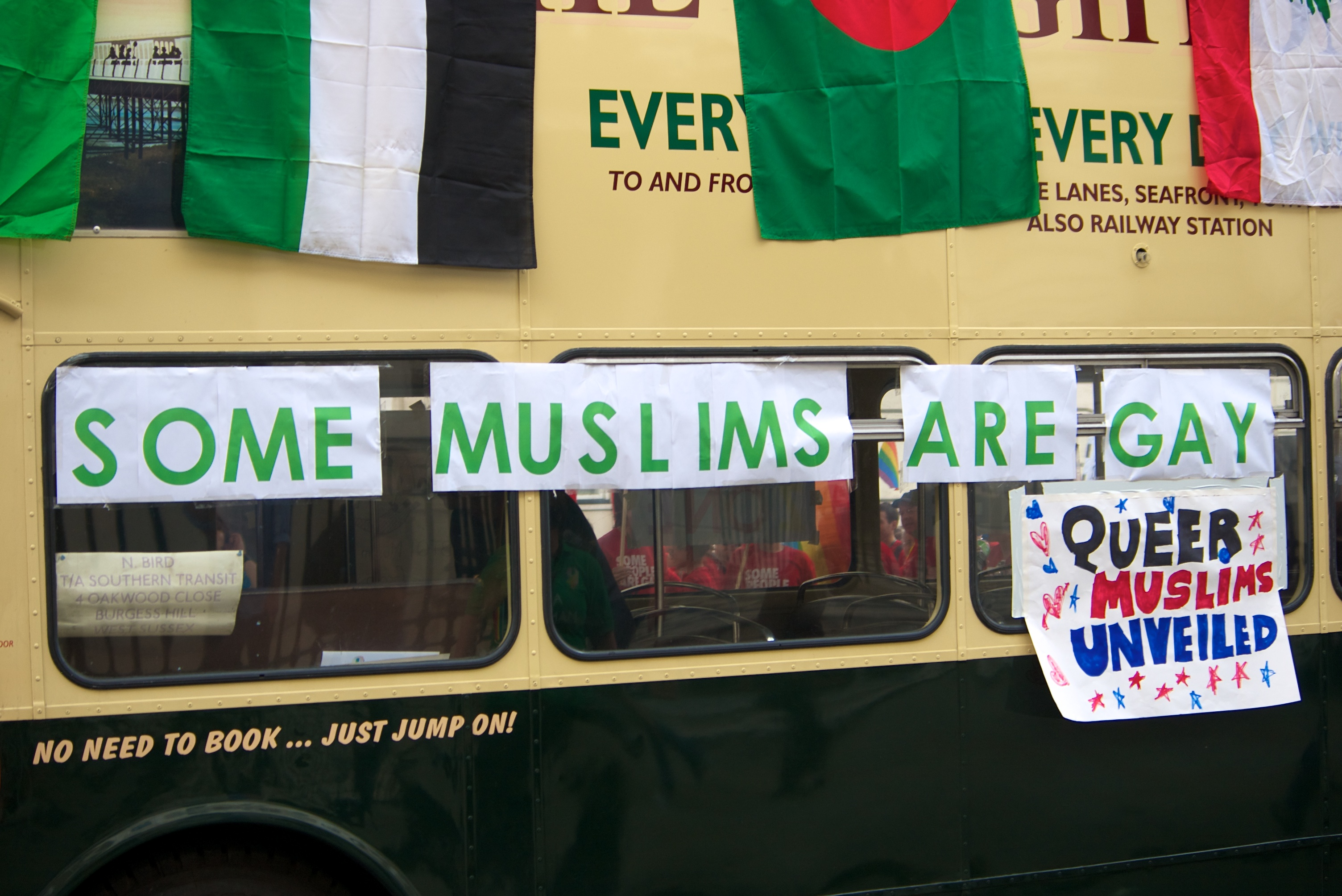
Float for gay Muslims at Pride London 2011

- In 2014, following the death of British born doctor Dr Nazim Mahmood, the charity Naz and Matt Foundation was launched to support LGBTQI+ individuals from predominantly Muslim backgrounds.
- In 2016, Mullah Taha became the first openly gay Shia cleric and started to conduct same-sex marriages to queer Shia Muslims.
- In September 2019, a British charity known as Imaan attempted to crowdfund £5,000 to host a festival for LGBTQ+ Muslims to challenge homophobic laws and societal views of LGBTQ+ individuals in Middle Eastern countries and the larger Muslim community.
- The Ibn Ruschd-Goethe Mosque in Berlin is a liberal mosque open to all types of Muslims, where men and women pray together and LGBTQ worshippers are welcomed and supported.
- Nur Warsame has been an advocate for LGBTQ Muslims. He founded Marhaba, a support group for queer Muslims in Melbourne, Australia. In May 2016, Warsame revealed that he is homosexual in an interview on SBS2's The Feed, being the first openly gay Imam in Australia.
- The Muslim Alliance for Sexual and Gender Diversity (MASGD) in the United States began on 23 January 2013. On 20 June 2016, an interview with Mirna Haidar (a member of the MASGD's steering committee) was published in The Washington Post. She described the MASGD as supporting "LGBT Muslims who want or need to embrace both their sexual and religious identities." Haidar said that the support which the MASGD provides is needed because a person who is "Muslim and queer " faces "two different systems of oppression": Islamophobia and homophobia.
- Muslims for Progressive Values, based in the United States and in Malaysia, is "a faith-based, grassroots, human rights organization that embodies and advocates for the traditional Qur'anic values of social justice and equality for all, for the 21st Century."
- The Safra Project for women is based in the UK. It supports and works on issues relating to prejudice LGBTQ Muslim women. It was founded in October 2001 by Muslim LBT women. The Safra Project's "ethos is one of inclusiveness and diversity."

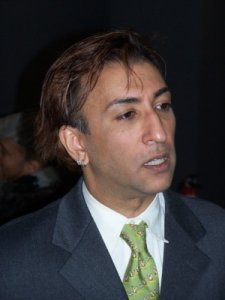
El-Farouk Khaki, founding member of the Salaam group and the Toronto Unity Mosque / el-Tawhid Juma Circle

- Salaam is the first gay Muslim group in Canada and second in the world. Salaam was found in 1993 by El-Farouk Khaki, who organized the Salaam/Al-Fateha International Conference in 2003.
- Sarajevo Open Centre (Sarajevski otvoreni centar), abbreviated SOC, is an independent feminist civil society organization and advocacy group which campaigns for lesbian, gay, bisexual, trans and intersex (LGBTI) people and women rights in Bosnia and Herzegovina. The organization also gives asylum and psychological support to victims of discrimination and violence. The Pink Report is an annual report made by the organization on the state of the Human Rights of LGBTI People in the country and is supported by the Norwegian Embassy.
- In May 2009, the Toronto Unity Mosque / el-Tawhid Juma Circle was founded by Laury Silvers, a University of Toronto religious studies scholar, alongside Muslim gay-rights activists El-Farouk Khaki and Troy Jackson. Unity Mosque/ETJC is a gender-equal, LGBTQ affirming, mosque. The mosque offers aims to eliminate gender segregation by removing a dress code for women. While it was the only mosques of its kind when it first opened, more communities and mosques have become more accepting of LGBTQ members. El-Farouk Khaki has been quoted as saying "more and more groups, communities and mosques that celebrate and embrace inclusion and diversity are forming".

=== Anti-LGBTQ ===
==== Ex-gay organizations ====
There are a number of Islamic ex-gay organizations, that is, those composed of people claiming to have experienced a basic change in sexual orientation from exclusive homosexuality to exclusive heterosexuality. These groups, like those based in socially conservative Christianity, are aimed at attempting to guide homosexuals towards heterosexuality. One of the leading LGBTQ reformatory Muslim organization is StraightWay Foundation, which was established in the United Kingdom in 2004 as an organization that provides information and advice for Muslims who struggle with homosexual attraction. They teach that the male-female pair is the "basis for humanity's growth" and that homosexual acts "are forbidden by God". NARTH has written favourably of the group. In 2004, Straightway entered into a controversy with the contemporary Mayor of London, Ken Livingstone, and the controversial Islamic cleric Yusuf al-Qaradawi. It was suggested that Livingstone was giving a platform to Islamic fundamentalists, and not liberal and progressive Muslims. Straightway responded to this by sending Livingstone a letter thanking him for his support of al-Qaradawi. Livingstone then ignited controversy when he thanked Straightway for the letter.

=== Actions against LGBTQ people ===
Several anti-LGBTQ incidents have occurred:

- In 2012, in the English city of Derby, some Muslim men "distributed ... leaflets depicting gay men being executed in an attempt to encourage hatred against homosexuals." The leaflets had such titles as "Turn or Burn" and "God abhors you" and they advocated a death penalty for homosexuality. The men were "convicted of hate crimes" on 20 January 2012. One of the men said that he was doing his Muslim duty.
- 31 December 2013 – New Year's Eve arson attack on gay nightclub in Seattle, packed with 300+ revelers, but no one injured. Subject charged prosecuted under federal terror and hate-crime charges.
- 25 April 2016 – Xulhaz Mannan, an employee of the United States embassy in Dhaka and the editor of Bangladesh's first and only LGBTQ magazine, was killed in his apartment by a gang of Islamic militants.
- 12 June 2016 – At least 49 people were killed and 50 injured in a mass shooting at Pulse gay nightclub in Orlando, Florida, in the second deadliest mass shooting by an individual and the deadliest incident of violence against LGBTQ people in U.S. history. The shooter, Omar Mateen, pledged allegiance to ISIL. The act has been described by investigators as an Islamic terrorist attack and a hate crime. Upon further review, investigators indicated Omar Mateen showed few signs of radicalization, suggesting that the shooter's pledge to ISIL may have been a calculated move to garner more news coverage. Muslim American and their community leaders swiftly condemned the attack, and prayer vigils for the victims were held at mosques across the country. (Note: These vigils included ones held in California, Arizona, Michigan, Pennsylvania, Connecticut, Florida, and Wisconsin.) The Florida mosque where Mateen sometimes prayed issued a statement condemning the attack and offering condolences to the victims. The Council on American–Islamic Relations called the attack "monstrous" and offered its condolences to the victims. CAIR Florida urged Muslims to donate blood and contribute funds in support of the victims' families.
- During March 2019, British Muslim parents began protesting Parkfield Community School, a town where more than a third of the children are Muslim, due to the school's implementation of a "No Outsiders" sex-education program. The aim of this program was to provide students with lessons on same-sex relationships. The protest led to the school backing down by no longer following through with the "No Outsider" program. Regardless of this, the school's minister emphasized that the school tries to express equality.
- 2026 Berlin Pride van attack

== See also ==
- Gender roles in Islam
- Islam and gender segregation
- Islamic sexual jurisprudence
- LGBTQ rights in the Middle East
- Sexual and gender minorities in the Ottoman Empire
- Inclusive Mosque Initiative
- Glossary of Islam
- Outline of Islam
- Index of Islam-related articles
