= Afdhere Jama =

American writer

- Born: 1980 (age 45–46); Somalia
- Occupations: Writer, Filmmaker
- Notable work: Illegal Citizens: Queer Lives in the Muslim World (2008)

Afdhere Jama (born 1980) is an American writer and filmmaker of Somali origin.

Jama was born and raised in Somalia. He moved to America when he was a teenager. Between the years 2000 and 2010, he was the editor of Huriyah. Jama is queer and Muslim.

In June 2016, after a shooting in Orlando, an article Jama had written in 2014 about LGBT Muslims was shared on social media.

== Huriyah ==
Jama was the editor in chief of Huriyah (Arabic: حرية, (Note: Standardized Arabic transliteration: Ḥurrīyah / Ḥurriyyah / ḥurriyya; pronunciation: /ħur.rij.ja/ [ħoɾˈɾejjæ, ħʊrˈrɪjja].) "freedom"), an LGBT Muslim magazine published between the years 2000 and 2010. It was based in San Francisco, California. Huriyah used the slogan "Queer Muslim Magazine".

The magazine was first published in Arabic and launched in English in 2002, with a focus on both LGBT and Muslim issues in politics, arts, and spirituality. It had a major interview every month, conducted by Jama, including of Daayiee Abdullah and Faisal Alam.

== Political views ==
In 2006 Jama stated, "My main difference with the majority of Muslims is the belief that a Jewish homeland is an important progress for all of us, especially one in their ancestral land of Israel". He continued, "Muslims in the United States must decide whether they see groups like Hamas and Hizbullah as legitimate resistance or the cause of Muslim troubles in the region".

== Films ==
- Hearts (2015)
- Angelenos (2013)
- Bits (2012)
- Over the Rainbow (2011) (segment "Carlita")
- Apart (2010)
- From Here To Timbuktu (2010) (segment "Trio")
- Rebound (2009)
- Ani (2009)
- Berlinsomnia (2008)
- Shukaansi (2007)

== Books ==
- Being Queer and Somali: LGBT Somalis At Home and Abroad (2015)
- Queer Jihad: LGBT Muslims on Coming Out, Activism, and the Faith (2013)
- Illegal Citizens: Queer Lives in the Muslim World (2008)
- At Noonday with the Gods of Somalia (2004)
