= Faisal Alam =

Gay Pakistani American (born 1977)

- Born: June 6, 1977 (48 years); Pakistan
- Occupations: Speaker, Writer, Activist
- Known for: Founded the Al-Fatiha Foundation

Faisal Alam is a gay Pakistani American man who founded the Al-Fatiha Foundation, an organization dedicated to advancing the cause of gay, lesbian, bisexual, and transgender Muslims.

Alam arrived in the United States from Pakistan in 1987, at the age of ten, and resided in the rural middle-class town of Ellington, Connecticut. In 1997, he started an email listserv for LGBT Muslims that led to the founding of Al-Fatiha in 1998. He served as its president from 1998 until stepping down in 2004. In 2011, Alam and other LGBTQ Muslim activists were invited by the National Gay and Lesbian Task Force to form a Queer Muslim Working Group to evaluate the needs of the LGBTQ Muslim community. Alam was instrumental in bringing together a diverse group of seasoned leaders to undertake this project. In 2013, the Queer Muslim Working Group launched a new organization: the Muslim Alliance for Sexual and Gender Diversity (MASGD).

He is a former member of the Advisory Committee of the LGBT Program at Human Rights Watch.

== Media Mentions ==
"21 LGBT Muslims Who Are Changing the World." The Advocate. December 20, 2016. Web

== See also ==
- Muhsin Hendricks South African gay imam
- Mullah Taha Iranian gay mullah
- Ludovic-Mohamed Zahed French-Algerian gay imam
- Nur Warsame Australian-Somali gay imam
- Daayiee Abdullah American gay imam
