= Ludovic-Mohamed Zahed =

French-Algerian gay imam (born 1977)

- لودفيك محمد زاهيد
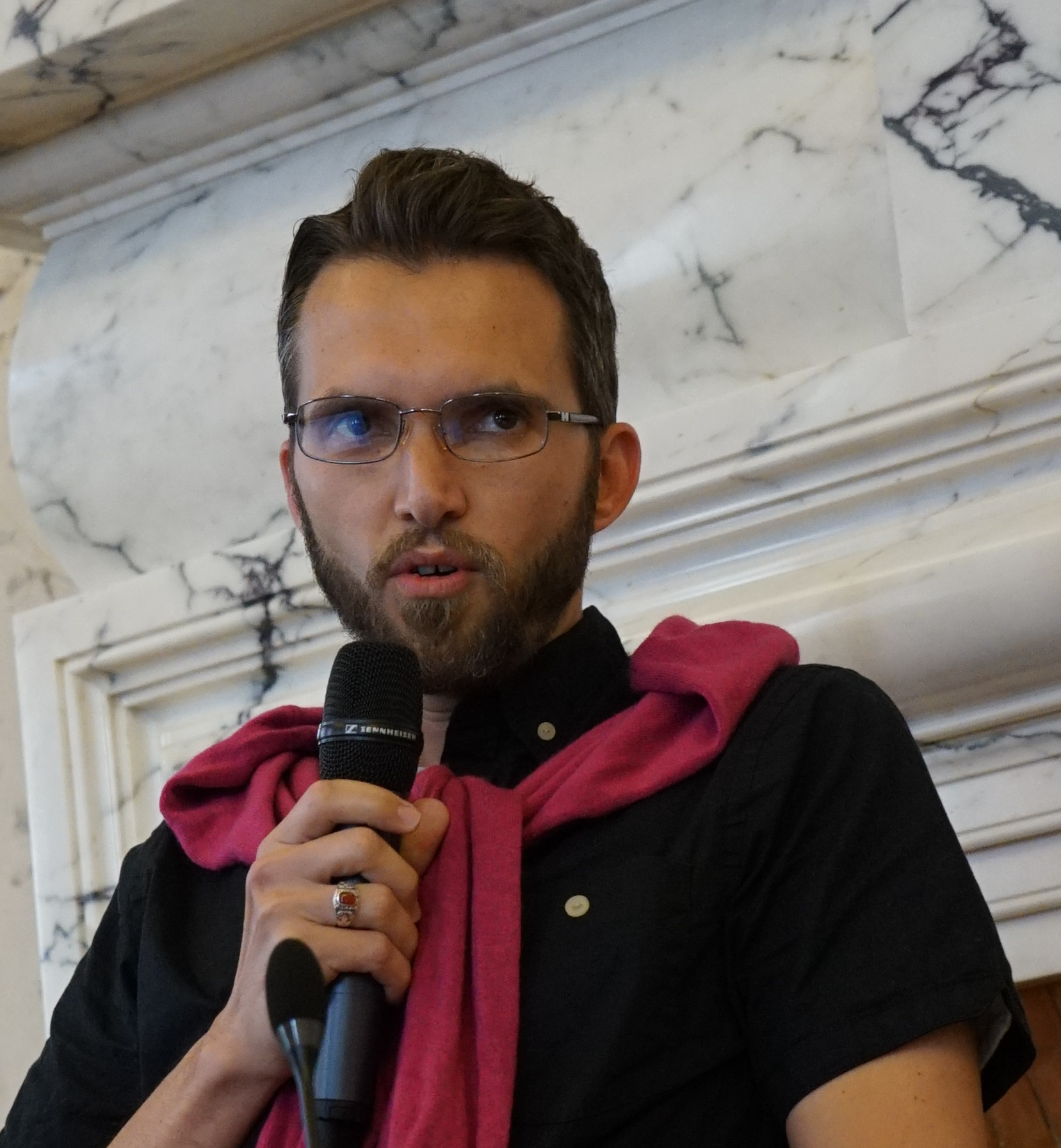
- Zahed in 2016
- Born: Mohamed Zahed; 1977 (age 48–49); Algiers, Algeria
- Citizenship: France
- Education: Ecole des Hautes Etudes en Sciences Sociales University of Nantes École normale supérieure
- Occupations: Imam and LGBTQ activist
- Years active: 2010–present
- Organization(s): Calem Institute, HM2F
- Movement: LGBTQ movements

Ludovic-Mohamed Zahed (Arabic: لودفيك محمد زاهيد; born 1977) is a French-Algerian imam. An openly gay Muslim, Zahed is the founder of an Islamic prayer room in Paris, France, with the goal of accommodating the LGBTQ and feminist Muslim communities. He also founded the LGBT Muslim association HM2F, and manages the Calem Institute in Marseille.

== Biography ==
He was born Mohamed Zahed in Algiers, Algeria, in 1977. Growing up between Algeria and France, he reported having felt "part boy, part girl" as a child. As a teenager, he struggled recognizing his own homosexuality while briefly involving himself in the Salafi movement; at the end of his teenage years, he rejected both Salafism and Islam and followed Buddhism instead. He acquired French citizenship at the age of 20, changing his first name to "Ludovic". At the age of 21, he decided to come out to his family, getting mixed reactions. He later returned to Islam, and in 2010 founded the organization HM2F, Homosexuel(les) musulman(es) de France (Muslim Homosexuals of France).

He studied Islamic theology at university in Algeria for five years, he is also a Hafiz and has preformed Hajj 5 times. He has a master's degree in Cognitive Psychology from the École Normale Supérieure, a PhD in The Social Psychology of Religions from the University of Nantes, and a further PhD in Anthropology from the École des Hautes Études en Sciences Sociales (EHESS) in Paris.

In November 2012, Zahed set up an "inclusive" Muslim prayer room in Paris, which has been described by the press as "Europe's first gay-friendly mosque". In 2019, he opened the Calem Institute in Marseille, which includes a prayer room and aims to raise awareness of progressive values (such as LGBT rights and feminism) within the Muslim world.

== Personal life ==
Zahed is HIV-positive, having contracted the illness as a teenager. In 2011, while same-sex marriage had yet to be legalized in France, he legally married a South African man in Cape Town. They later moved to France, and were united by another, religious marriage ceremony (having no legal value in France) performed by an imam in 2012.

In June 2019, Zahed gave an interview to Agenda, the blog of the World Economic Forum, regarding his experiences after his coming out as a homosexual man.

=== Political views ===
Ludovic-Mohamed Zahed has described himself as a "progressive Muslim" who argues that believers should "question institutional dogma" and insists that "neither homophobia or misogyny respect Islamic ethics". Through his works, he has voiced his concerns for the Muslim community in France, and LGBT Muslims in particular, who according to him, are facing both threats of homonationalism and religious fundamentalism. In France, he has openly stood in favor of same-sex marriage.

== Controversies ==
The opening of a Muslim prayer room by Zahed in Paris, which he described as more "inclusive" to LGBT believers, was met with mixed reaction from the rest of the Muslim community in France; a spokesman for the Grand Mosque of Paris stated that the prayer room did not belong to the Islamic community.

In 2014, two Muslim Iranian women were married by Zahed in a religious ceremony held in Stockholm, Sweden, which prompted a group of Algerian Salafists to demand that Zahed be stripped of his Algerian citizenship.

== Publications ==
- Homosexuality, Transidentity, and Islam: A Study of Scripture Confronting the Politics of Gender and Sexuality (2019), translated by Adi S. Bharat, Amsterdam University Press.
- LGBT Musulman-es: du Placard aux Lumières, face aux obscurantismes et aux homo-nationalismes (2016), Des Ailes sur un Tracteur.
- Queer Muslim Marriage: Struggle of a gay couple's true life story towards Inclusivity & Tawheed within Islam (2013), CALEM.
- Le Coran et la chair (2012), Éditions Max Milo.
- Révoltes extraordinaires: un enfant du sida autour du monde (2011), L'Harmattan.

== See also ==
- Muhsin Hendricks
- Mullah Taha
- Nur Warsame
- Daayiee Abdullah
- Faisal Alam
- El-Farouk Khaki
- Inclusive Mosque Initiative
- LGBT in Paris
