= Tynan Power =

Tynan Power (born 1970) is a progressive Muslim activist who advocates for gender equality and transgender rights in Muslim communities.

== Early life and education ==
Tynan Power was born in 1970 in Washington, D.C., to Carol Cargill and James Power. His mother was an applied linguistics professor and his father was a federal mediator and, previously, a Catholic priest. The couple divorced when Power was a baby.

Power spent most of his life in Tampa, Florida, before moving to Massachusetts in 1999. He was raised Catholic, but converted to Islam in 1985 at age fourteen. Although he was designated female at birth, he recognized that he identified as male at an early age and transitioned from female to male as an adult.

Power attended the University of South Florida in Tampa briefly in 1987, but moved to Morocco partway through his undergraduate education. After moving back to the United States, he returned to the University of South Florida and received his Bachelor of Arts in English in 1995. In 2000, at the University of South Florida in St. Petersburg, he received his Master of Arts in Mass Communication-Journalism.

== Work and activism ==
Power was a founding member of the Muslim Alliance for Sexual and Gender Diversity (MASGD), which works to support and connect LGBTQ+ Muslims. He served as a program coordinator at MASGD's Trans Wellness Conference from 2012 to 2014. Power also served as co-chair for MASGD's retreat for two years and served on the retreat planning team for five. Before his work with MASGD, Power was an early member of Al-Fatiha Foundation, a similar organization that disbanded in 2005, and served on its or advisory council.

In July 2015, Power was an invited speaker at the National Interfaith Service held in Philadelphia, Pennsylvania, as part of the LGBT 50th celebration. He joined Bishop Gene Robinson, Rev. Jeffrey H. Jordan-Pickett, Rabbi Linda Holtzman, Rabbi Margot Stein, Rev. Timothy Safford, Rev. Susan Richardson and singer Jonathan Allen at the event.

Power previously worked as the Muslim coordinator with Transfaith, which is a nonprofit based in Philadelphia that supports transgender individuals in religious communities. Power works for Smith College School for Social Work as a communications specialist. He also gives speeches about transgender and Islam, LGBT Muslims, and progressive Muslims.

== Publications ==
- Progressive Muslim Identities: Personal Stories from the U.S. and Canada. Eds. Zahra Ayubi, Sara Farooqi, Vanessa Karam, Tynan Power, Olivia Samad & Ani Zonneveld. Oracle Releasing, 2011. ISBN 0983716102
- Margaret Price with Leah (Phinnia) Meredith, Cal Montgomery, and Tynan Power. "In/ter/dependent Scholarship" in Mad at School: Rhetorics of Mental Disability and Academic Life"'. University of Michigan Press, 2011. ISBN 9780472071388
