= StraightWay Foundation =

Conversion therapy organization for Muslims in the UK

The StraightWay Foundation was established in the United Kingdom in 2004 as an organization that provides information and advice for Muslims who struggle with homosexual attraction. Its current chairman's name is Mujahid Mustaqim. They believe "that through following God's guidance", one may "cease to be" gay. They teach that the male-female pair is the "basis for humanity's growth" and that homosexual acts "are forbidden by God". NARTH has written favourably of the group.

In 2004, Straightway entered into a controversy with the Mayor of London (Ken Livingstone), and the controversial Islamic cleric Yusuf al-Qaradawi. It was suggested that Livingstone was giving a platform to Islamic fundamentalists, and not liberal and progressive Muslims. Straightway responded to this by compiling a document to clarify what they regarded as fundamental issues concerning Islam and homosexuality. They sent Livingstone a letter thanking him for his support of al-Qaradawi. Livingstone then ignited controversy when he thanked Straightway for the letter.

== See also ==
- LGBT and Islam
