= Muslim Alliance for Sexual and Gender Diversity =

Muslim LGBTQIA+ organization

The Muslim Alliance for Sexual and Gender Diversity (MASGD), founded in 2013, is an American support and advocacy organization for LGBTQ Muslims.

== History ==
The Muslim Alliance for Sexual and Gender Diversity was launched in January 2013 in Atlanta. The organization was formed by members of the Queer Muslim Working Group, with the support of the National Gay and Lesbian Task Force. Several initial MASGD members previously had been involved with the Al-Fatiha Foundation, including Faisal Alam, Urooj Arshad, Tynan Power, and Imam Daayiee Abdullah. Co-founders include Raquel Saraswati, Yas Ahmed, Imi Rashid and Sahar Shafqat.

In 2016, The Advocate magazine named four MASGD steering committee members in its list of "21 LGBT Muslims Who Are Changing the World." MASGD is currently led by Mx. Yaffa AS. As of late 2022, MASGD is one of the few entirely Global Majority and Trans Muslim orgs.

== Mission ==
The mission of MASGD is to support, empower, and connect LGBTQ+ Muslims. The mission statement goes on to say: "In our work, we challenge root causes of oppression, including misogyny, racism, capitalism, and xenophobia. We celebrate gender and sexual diversity within Muslim communities and promote an understanding of Islam that is centered on inclusion, justice, and equity."

== Retreat ==
The first project of MASGD was an LGBTQ+ Muslim Retreat. The first Retreat was held in 2011, under the auspices of the Queer Muslim Working Group. Since then, the Retreat has been held each May. In 2013, the Retreat welcomed a total of 85 adults, including both LGBTQ+ Muslims and their partners. In 2023, MASGD hosted its first Black QTM retreat.
