= University of Islamic Studies =

Muslim religious university in Karachi, Pakistan

The University of Islamic Studies is a Muslim religious university in Karachi, Pakistan. Work began on the university in 1987.

== Notable alumni ==
- Muhsin Hendricks, World's first openly queer imam.

== Criticism ==
Some of the students at the university have been accused of ties to terrorism. The Summary of Evidence memo prepared for Tawfiq bin Attash's Combatant Status Review Tribunal stated: The detainee's University of Islamic Studies identification card was found at an alleged al Qaida residence in Karachi, Pakistan." Tawfiq bin Attash is alleged to have been one of the key players in the 1998 East Africa Embassy bombings and the 2000 USS Cole bombing.

Amnesty International reports that Shahrulnizam Hamzah and Mohamed Akil abdul Raof were students at the University who were apprehended by Pakistani authorities on 20 September 2003 due to suspicion they had ties to terrorism.

== Bibliography ==
- "KARACHI: Unregistered institutes warned of closure". DAWN.COM. 24 February 2004.
- In the Name of Security: Counterterrorism and Human Rights Abuses Under Malaysia's Internal Security Act. Human Rights Watch. 2004.
- Gunaratna, Rohan; Hussin, Sabariah (26 September 2019). Terrorist Deradicalisation in Global Contexts: Success, Failure and Continuity. Routledge. ISBN 978-1-000-70754-0.
- Bubalo, A; Phillips, S; Yasmeen, S. Talib or Taliban? Indonesian students in Pakistan and Yemen (PDF).
