= LGBTQ rights in Algeria =

- Algeria
- Legal status: Illegal since 1966
- Penalty: Up to 3 years imprisonment with fines up to 10,000 dinars.
- Gender identity: No
- Military: No
- Discrimination protections: None

Family rights
- Recognition of relationships: No recognition of same-sex relationships
- Adoption: No

Lesbian, gay, bisexual, transgender and queer or questioning (LGBTQ) people in Algeria face legal challenges and discrimination not experienced by non-LGBTQ residents. According to the International Lesbian and Gay Association's May 2008 report, both female and male same-sex sexual acts are illegal in Algeria. Homophobic attitudes are normalised within Algerian society, and LGBTQ people are commonly subjected to discrimination and potential arrest.

== Law regarding same-sex sexual activity ==
Article 338 of Algerian law (English translation) reads:

"Anyone guilty of a homosexual act is punishable with imprisonment of between 2 months and two years, and with a fine of 500 to 2000 Algerian Dinars. If one of the participants is below 18 years old, the punishment for the older person can be raised to 3 years' imprisonment and a fine of 10,000 dinars"

— Article 338, ILGA May 2008 world laws report

Article 333 of the Algerian law (English translation) reads:

"When the outrage to public decency has consisted of an act against nature with an individual of the same sex, the penalty is imprisonment of between 6 months and 3 years, and a fine of between 1,000 and 10,000 Algerian Dinars."

— Article 333, ILGA May 2008 world laws report

Vigilante executions, beatings, and torture have also occurred, with police frequently joining in on the attacks, being complicit, or turning a blind eye.

The criminal laws originate from the prevailing mores in Algeria that view homosexuality and cross-dressing as against the Islamic faith.

== Living conditions ==
Homosexuality is prohibited by law, and the prevailing social attitude is openly negative, even violent. The law does not recognize or respect the civil rights of LGBTQ persons. Officially, there are no gay-friendly establishments and no political organization is allowed to campaign for LGBTQ rights. Examples of hate crimes against homosexuals include the stoning of two men in the street in 2001 and the killing of two men, one in 1994 and the other in 1996.

Most attempts of having unofficial same-sex marriages are blocked by police, as was the case in a 2005 attempt.

Assil Belatla was a student who was murdered in 2019 because he was suspected of being gay. The student was murdered in his dormitory in the university district and the words "he is gay" were painted on the wall with his blood. The killer thought he would avoid prosecution for the killing.

Houari Manar, a popular raï singer widely thought to be gay, died in 2019. Following his death, several homophobic comments were made on social media.

According to a survey done for BBC News Arabic by the Arab Barometer research network in 2018–19, about 26% of Algerians think that homosexuality should be accepted.

== Summary table ==
Same-sex sexual activity
Same-sex sexual activity legal	No	Penalty of up to three years imprisonment with fines up to 10,000 dinars
Equal age of consent	No	Not applicable, as all same-sex activity is illegal in Algeria
Anti-discrimination laws
Anti-discrimination laws in employment only	No	
Anti-discrimination laws in the provision of goods and services	No	
Anti-discrimination laws in all other areas (Incl. indirect discrimination, hate speech)	No	
Anti-discrimination laws in gender identity	No	
Legislative rights
Same-sex marriages	No	The Algerian family code specifically limits marriage to heterosexual couples
Same-sex civil unions	No	
Recognition of same-sex couples	No	
Adoption and children
Step-child adoption by same-sex couples	No	
Joint adoption by same-sex couples	No	
Automatic parenthood on birth certificates for children of same-sex couples	No	
Access to IVF for lesbians	No	
Commercial surrogacy for gay male couples	No	Illegal for all couples regardless of sexual orientation
Commercial surrogacy for lesbian female couples	No	Illegal for all couples regardless of sexual orientation
Military service
Gays and lesbians allowed to serve openly in the military	No	Algeria does not permit homosexual soldiers, with it being reportedly enforced
Transgender rights
Right to change legal gender	No	No legal option to change gender
Other
Conversion therapy ban	No	No laws banning conversion therapy in Algeria, with the practice reportedly being quite widespread
MSMs allowed to donate blood	Yes	No evidence of a legislative ban on MSM donating blood in Algeria

== See also ==
- Human rights in Algeria
- Politics of Algeria
- LGBTQ rights in Africa
