= Illegal Citizens =

2008 book by Afdhere Jama

- Front cover of book
- Author: Afdhere Jama
- Language: English
- Genre: Nonfiction
- Publisher: Salaam Press
- Publication date: July 25, 2008
- Publication place: United States
- Media type: Print (paperback)
- Pages: 184 pp (first edition, paperback)
- ISBN: 0-9800138-8-7 (first edition, paperback)
- OCLC: 268678619
- Preceded by: At Noonday with the Gods of Somalia

Illegal Citizens: Queer Lives in the Muslim World is a book by American writer Afdhere Jama published in 2008 by Salaam Press.

The book is about the lives of 33 people in 22 countries. Countries whose citizens are profiled include Nigeria, Egypt, Saudi Arabia, Israel, Iran, India, Indonesia, Turkey, Bosnia, and others. Its format is a collection of personal narratives, written in the first person.
