= Muhsin Hendricks =

South African gay imam (1967–2025)

Imam Muhsin Hendricks
- Hendricks in 2022
- Born: 7 June 1967; Cape Town, Western Cape, South Africa
- Died: 15 February 2025 (aged 57); Bethelsdorp, Eastern Cape, South Africa
- Cause of death: Murder by gunshot
- Education: Bachelor's degree in Classical Arabic and Islamic sciences
- Alma mater: University of Islamic Studies, Karachi, Pakistan
- Occupation: Imam (Sunni Islam)
- Years active: 1996–2025
- Organization(s): Al-Fitra Foundation, Al-Ghurbaah Foundation
- Known for: First openly queer imam
- Notable work: A Jihad for Love, The Radical
- Movement: LGBTQ movement
- Children: 3

Muhsin Hendricks (7 June 1967 – 15 February 2025) was a South African imam, Islamic scholar and LGBTQ activist. He was involved in various LGBTQ Muslim advocacy groups and was an advocate for greater acceptance of LGBTQ people within Islam. He has been described as the world's first openly gay imam, having come out in 1996. Hendricks died from gunfire wounds in an attack in February 2025 in Bethelsdorp, South Africa. In an obituary, The Economist wrote that Hendricks's ministry provided "meeting places, a mosque, constant reassurance and two human-rights foundations to defend Muslims torn between their faith and their sexuality".

== Early and personal life ==
Hendricks was born in Cape Town on June 7 1967 and brought up in a traditional Muslim home. His grandfather was an Islamic cleric. He studied at the University of Islamic Studies in Karachi, Pakistan. He also held a diploma in counselling and communications through the South African College of Applied Psychology. He stated that he used his studies to counsel the marginalised Muslim queer community. He stated that his "forefathers are a mixture of Indonesian and Indian background. They were brought to Cape Town as political prisoners and slaves by the Dutch colonialists".

He married a woman in 1991, and had children with her before they divorced in 1996: later that year he came out as gay. He subsequently lived in a barn for three months, fasting for around 80 days and meditating on his faith in the form of Salat al-Istikharah. Hendricks came out later that year, at the age of 29. At the time, he was serving as an imam, imparting teachings in mosques and at the nearby madrasa, and he was fired because of his sexual orientation. Although his father was supportive, his mother was shocked. He and his mother reconciled after she spent ten days living with Hendricks and his partner, and the two maintained a close relationship until her death.

Hendricks married a Hindu man in 2006.

== Activism ==
In 1996, Hendricks founded the Inner Circle, a support network aiding (but not exclusively for) gay Muslims in coming to terms with their sexual orientation and how this may impact their religious faith. They were founded in response to LGBTQ Muslims who felt excluded from mainstream mosques during Friday prayers. From 1998 onwards, Hendricks provided prayers, counselling and Muslim same-sex marriage ceremonies. Inner Circle was later known as Al-Fitrah Foundation.

His stated interpretation, in opposition to mainstream Islam, was that there is nothing in the Quran that condemns homosexuality. He interpreted the story of Sodom and Gomorrah as condemning rape, rather than homosexuality. This is in opposition to mainstream Muslim views, which use the story to condemn same-sex behaviour. The Muslim Judicial Council condemned Hendricks in 2007, later issuing a fatwa against gay people. This position, which is backed up by most of South Africa's mainstream Muslim organisations, has been criticised for not recognising gender and sexual diversity in pre-colonial Muslim societies. In addition to this, in the African context, there has often been pushback to LGBTQ rights from conservative groups of all faiths, who view homosexuality as un-African.

In 2011, he founded Masjidul Ghurbaah in South Africa, a mosque belonging to the Al-Ghurbaah Foundation. Of this endeavour, Hendricks said: "There is this love-hate relationship from the Muslim community. Sometimes they feel that I should be thrown from the highest mountain, and sometimes they appreciate that there is one imam who is willing to work with people who they are unwilling to work with". Al-Fitrah Foundation later founded the Masjid Ul-Umam.

In 2019, Hendricks travelled to Kenya to advocate for LGBTQ rights. By 2022, he developed multifaith training courses for the Global Interfaith Network.

In a podcast with Amina Wadud, Hendricks stated that he did not think that marriage is a requirement for sexual intercourse in sharia, and that consent and compatibility were the only requirements.

In 2022, Hendricks raised concerns about the Muslim Judicial Council (MJC)'s "Short Fatwa," which he believed could have detrimental effects on the gay community. Hendricks challenged the MJC's decision, expressing worries about the potential harm it could cause to LGBTQ individuals.

=== Internet and film activism ===
During the COVID-19 pandemic, Hendricks began posting TikToks with positive messages about love. By 2022, he was creating online videos about LGBTQ Muslims in Hindi and Urdu.

Hendricks appeared in the 2007 documentary film A Jihad for Love. In 2022, he was the subject of The Radical, a German documentary film.

== Death and responses ==
Hendricks was shot dead in Bethelsdorp, Eastern Cape, on 15 February 2025, aged 57. While Hendricks was travelling in the back seat of a car, a Toyota Hilux stopped in front of the car – blocking the road – before two masked gunmen opened fire. Security camera footage shows the assailants fleeing the scene. As of 16 February, the police were still investigating a motive for the killing. South African president Cyril Ramaphosa paid his condolences to Hendricks' family and friends. Hendricks was laid to rest in a private ceremony, and buried in a secret location (kramat) according to Sufi traditions in the Cape.

The Cape Town Ulama Board (CTUB) and United Ulama Council of South Africa (UUCSA) condemned the murder of Hendricks, while expressing their disapproval of his views. They emphasised the Islamic condemnation of violence and the importance of adhering to the rule of law, and stated that violence as a response to disagreements is unacceptable. They urged against speculation about the motive behind the murder and condemned any acts of violence against the LGBTQ community.

The International Lesbian, Gay, Bisexual, Trans and Intersex Association (ILGA) criticised Hendricks's killing and called on authorities to investigate the death.

Initial reports claimed that he was murdered after reportedly officiating a lesbian wedding in Gqeberha. The Al-Ghurbaah Foundation, founded by Hendricks, disputed this and said that he had instead officiated the weddings of "two interfaith heterosexual couples" in Gqeberha.

As of September 2026, no arrests had been made in his murder, despite the existence of CCTV footage. No residents near the crime scene have been interviewed by police. Footage shows both the shooter and the vehicle used in the killing. A man claiming to know the killers has contacted Hendrick's supporters anonymously, alleging that local police have been bribed by those contracted to commit the murder.

== See also ==
- Mullah Taha
- Ludovic-Mohamed Zahed
- Nur Warsame
- Daayiee Abdullah
