= Taha (Shia cleric) =

Iranian gay mullah

Hojjatoleslam Taha
- طه
- Born: Iran
- Occupation: Shia Muslim cleric
- Known for: First openly queer Shia cleric
- Title: Hujjat al-Islam
- Movement: LGBTQ movement

Mullah Taha (Persian: طه) is a gay Shia Muslim cleric from Iran, and the first openly queer cleric in Shia Islam.

He is the son of a cleric, and described his childhood self as being "effeminate". He attended Islamic school at the age of 15, where he realized his homosexuality, and attained the rank of Hujjat al-Islam.

He officiated gay marriages in secret, leading to him being questioned by other clerics and threatened with death. He was forced by the Iranian government to flee to Turkey, where he has lived as of 2016.

He continued to perform same-sex marriages for queer Shia Muslim refugees in Istanbul. He stated that he's treated with suspicion by both the Muslim community and the LGBTQ community. He resides temporarily in Turkey, as his ultimate destination is Canada, where he has sought asylum.

== See also ==
- Muhsin Hendricks
- Ludovic-Mohamed Zahed
- Nur Warsame
- Daayiee Abdullah
