= Inclusive Mosque Initiative =

The Inclusive Mosque Initiative (IMI) was founded in 2012, in London, UK. It is a grassroots activist organisation which works towards promoting the understanding of an intersectional feminist Islam. In practice, this means that IMI spaces and events are organised to be as inclusive as possible; unlike many existing mosques and religious organisations, IMI is not divided along linguistic, sectarian, political or ethnic lines. The organisation makes every effort towards providing disabled access to and within its venues, including British Sign Language (BSL) within its services, and giving translations of Arabic words when used.

The organisation is based in London and occasionally holds events in other UK cities. IMI is a registered charity in the UK with a board supported by advisers, volunteers, and two members of staff. The team that runs IMI "are a collective of practising Muslims who are part of many Muslim communities… [they] come from a range of Islamic backgrounds, including Sunni, Shia, Sufi, Quranist, Salafi, Barelvi, Islamic feminist, traditional, secular, progressive, unsure and conservative... [their] backgrounds also reflect the diversity within British Islam, including: Arab, mixed heritage, Malaysian, Central European, South Asian, East African, white reverts, North African and Persian".

Significantly, the organisation was founded by two female activists, and female leadership remains central to their ethos. The initial conversations were between two women. Though the issue of gender justice in action was and still is a key component in the formulation of IMI, the differences in race, religious practice-denomination, age and activist experience helped shape the IMI concept to be plural from its outset. The beginning of IMI emerged from their frustrations with the situation for women in many British mosques, where often women’s sections do not exist and ‘sometimes the facilities for women are very inferior, cramped, and not at all conducive to the attitude of worship.’ The Inclusive Mosque Initiative aims to offer alternative spaces of worship and promote Islam in a way which particularly includes marginalised communities. In 2015, the Inclusive Mosque Initiative UK became a registered charity.

== IMI’s religious activities ==
IMI’s long-term aim is to build permanent, carbon-neutral mosque spaces which can function as physical centres for the organizations ongoing activities. In the meantime, IMI’s prayer spaces are ‘nomadic,’ based on the 'pop-up restaurant' or shop format, and traveling around the city of London and, less often, the country, in rented spaces; ‘Venue sites have therefore included cafes, secular community centres, a church, Buddhist centre, an Islamic institute and public parks.’ Since its inception IMI has held over 80 group prayers, and spiritual services, including zhikr, Qur'anic discussion circles, and multiple discussion and social events. Throughout the year IMI offers jummah services, iftaars and special events for religious festivals, and Eid prayers.

In 2015 it held a jummah in recognition of International Women's Day at St Johns Church in Waterloo London, hosting notable scholar and activist Dr. Wadud.

== Other IMI events ==
In addition to such religious services and practices, IMI organizes regular social events and discussions, which take up contemporary themes and facilitates discussion. In addition to its ongoing interest and commitment to eco-Islam, IMI’s working themes seem to be threefold; (1) gender and sexuality, (2) disability and mental health, and (3) interfaith, intrafaith and commonalities amongst humans.

IMI events usually feature a respected speaker, religious scholar, or specialist on the topic, and allows for informal exchange of ideas and experiences in an intentionally safe space. They also actively welcome non-Muslims to their spaces, which distinguishes IMI from many other mosques, and have held interfaith prayers and events in spaces rented from other faith-groups (such as St Johns Church, London). In practice IMI further proactively works towards welcoming and respecting everybody who attends their events, and promoting acceptance on both the inter-faith, and intra-faith levels. As the founders say;

The aims and purposes of an inclusive mosque are perhaps best demonstrated in what we do, or, our practices. These include, whilst continuing to widen as we learn(!), a range of practices such as full involvement of women at every level of the organisation (including ritual leadership); truly democratic decision making processes and organizational practices; fully accessible venues; that the dominant language of any geographic area be spoken at mosques, and if other languages are used during formal talks/prayers, that they are translated including the use of Sign Language, whenever possible; considerations of whether a hearing induction loop is available at venues and to utilize it, if there is accessible public transport links nearby and suitable car parking. Relatedly, food offered at Friday prayers (jummah) and events aim to be vegetarian, gluten free, along with dairy alternatives and maintaining a high level of health & safety cleanliness during preparations and clearly labeling foods which may contain allergens. IMI texts are printed in a relevantly suitable size font and ideally on an off-white background against the text to improve contrast for those with visual impairments.

IMI’s events aim to reflect the interests and concerns of its regular stake-holders, whilst also expanding the boundaries of thinking on relevant social issues. Some recent topics covered include; Islamic banking, Humor in the Hadith, Mental Health & Jinn possession, Hijab & mosques, The Importance of Isa to Muslims, Islamic Masculinity, Mental health, Tackling Shadeism, converts, reverters, ex-Muslims, eco-Islam, Islam and adoption. IMI has also organized numerous talks around aspects of the Qur'an (such as Human rights in the Quran, natural phenomena and divine signs, and the significance of the Hijra), and collaborated with other organisations to provide discussions, spiritual services, creative and musical events and soup kitchen projects.

In addition IMI is particularly concerned with female involvement, management and access to its spaces, and ensuring that every attendee is able to access the space and content; 'The Management committee is a majority percentage of women, and all together takes responsibility for the strategic vision and its implementation of the inclusive mosques. The Management committee is supported by administrators and various other roles, including Imams, scholars, teachers, event organizers, advisors and consultants.' Whilst not all of IMI’s volunteers may agree with Islamic feminist concepts, or identify as feminists, they remain, overall, united in their understanding of mosques as necessarily accessible to everyone. Unlike some of IMI’s producers, the volunteers reflect a vast range of religious identities and traditions, and it is this unique blend of inclusive ethos and diversity amongst its organizers that renders IMI spaces and events attractive to a wide demographic. Many of the events IMI organises are recorded and posted on their YouTube channel.

== Funding ==
IMI is funded entirely by donations and volunteers own contributions, and receives no local or national government funding.

== Research ==
In 2013 IMI commissioned a pilot study into women's experiences of UK mosques, and aspirations for inclusion. This study ‘showed ... just how important mosques are to Muslim women and just how passionate, and emotional, people feel about being able to access and enjoy them. What was most surprising was how non-practicing women insisted that they would like to attend events and benefit from their local mosques, and how central they could be in everyone's lives, regardless of religious practice.

As well as informing IMI’s work and stake-holder strategies, research output from this pilot study includes a book chapter in an edited collection and as a peer-reviewed academic article in the Journal of Contemporary Islam.

== Genealogy of IMI ==
IMI was inspired by progressive Muslim scholarship, female disillusionment with existing mosque options, and recent activists efforts to reclaim the inclusive spirit of early Muslim community. As an organisation IMI traces its genealogy through Muslim activist efforts across the globe, particularly efforts around ritual and space-making practices which reflect an inclusive, plural and liberationist Islam. These include, but are not limited to; Nüsi mosques, Progressive Muslim Union, Muslims for Progressive Values chapters across the United States and the El-Tawhid Jummah Circle in Canada. Other influences include the social medias which relate to such spaces (such as side entrance website), Free Minds website and the Muslim WakeUp! website. Under its statement of Intent the Inclusive Mosque Initiative offers five key aims;

- provide a peaceful, enriching environment for worship and remembrance of Allah
- create an inclusive sacred space that welcomes all people
- respect the natural environment
- value gender expression and gender justice as an integral manifestation of Islamic practice
- facilitate inter-community and inter-faith dialogue and collaborate with others who are seeking change for social and economic welfare and justice

Relatedly, and thematically linking both the above channels of influence is the work of progressive, feminist and liberationist scholars rereading primarily Islamic sources in practice-based ways, such as Wadud’s canonical work and activist endeavours on gender equality, and Asra Nomani’s ‘Islamic Bill of Rights for Women’. The emergence of IMI in the UK seems to accord with recent social commentary that observes an increasingly visible ‘emergence, and reemergence, and expansion of female religious leadership in a wide variety of Muslim communities ... Over the past thirty years the ranks of Muslim women active as religious leaders have swelled to include individuals from almost all parts of the globe, including the Middle East; North, East, West, and South Africa; Central, South, Southeast, and East Asia; Europe; and North America.

That said, from its inception IMI has functioned to broaden the mosque environment, adding to the diversity of the 1500 mosques in the UK and promoting discussion about women’s inclusion within mosque culture. IMI is also fully committed to engaging with the broader community and welcomes non-Muslim attendants and participants to all events and activities. It allows for a space dialogue for various expressions of Islam to engage with one another and participate in a variety of Islamic traditions and practices.

== IMI and the media ==
IMI works to engage Muslim and non-Muslim organizations around its inclusive ethos, and maintains various social justice campaigns. To this aim, it has collaborated with a range of other organizations on particular events, and is rapidly becoming an alternative British Muslim voice within British, and international, media channels.

== Tolerance and non-violence ==
Tolerance is a key principle of Inclusive Mosque Initiative, which promotes interfaith dialogue and conflict resolution within both intra-faith and inter-faith situations. It is also one of the few British Muslim organisations which proactively includes non-Muslims in its work and events, although the management committee is all Muslim identified.

== Feminism ==
Feminism is one of Inclusive Mosque Initiative's key concerns, the place of women in Islam, traditional gender roles in Islam and Islamic feminism are likewise major issues. IMI provides a space where families can pray together and at times are led by women. In all circumstances, regardless of the madhab of salah or who's leading, there is no compulsion for attendants to join in salah.

== LGBT rights ==
Inclusive Mosque Initiative is intentionally inclusive and welcomes everyone who is interested in its activities. Whilst IMI is not a specifically queer organisation, amongst its social justice campaigns, IMI is openly concerned with the rights and safety of the LGBT community. Imi also works with, and follows, guidance of progressive, liberationist readings of Islam, and welcomes everyone regardless of gender or sexual identities.

== Ijtihad ==
IMI stresses the importance of freedom of expression with regards to Islamic law and the personal practice of Islamic spirituality. Ijtihad is the questioning of traditional interpretations of sharia in the light of modern wisdom and scientific knowledge. IMI encourages a holistic view of Islam which takes into account the 7th-century Arabian cultural context and recognises the differences between Muslim understandings of Islam and tradition.
