= Nur Warsame =

Australian gay imam (born c.1984)

Nur Muhammad Warsame (Arabic: نور محمد وارسام; born c. 1984) is a gay imam from Australia. He is a hafiz, i.e. one who has memorised the Quran; he is the second Victorian imam to earn this title.

Warsame was born in Somalia and lived in Egypt and Canada as a child. He moved to Melbourne in Australia as a high school student, and has been an imam since 2003.

Previously married to a woman and with one daughter, Warsame came out as Australia's first openly gay imam in 2010, after a suicide attempt that made him "much stronger". As of 2018, he was the only openly gay imam in the country.

He studied partly at Al-Azhar University, and served as an imam at several mosques in Australia before he came out as gay. He has performed Hajj 6 times.

Since 2014, he has run the underground LGBT support group Marhaba ('welcome' in Arabic) and says he was ostracised by the Muslim community because of his sexual orientation, and intended to open Australia's first mosque which was open to the LGBT community. That year, he spoke at the Sydney Gay and Lesbian Mardi Gras.

== See also ==
- Muhsin Hendricks
- Mullah Taha
- Ludovic-Mohamed Zahed
- Daayiee Abdullah
