= Al-Fatiha Foundation =

Advocacy organization for LGBTQ+ Muslims

The Al-Fatiha Foundation was an organization which advanced the civil, political, and legal rights of LGBTQ+ Muslims. It was founded in 1997 by Faisal Alam, a Pakistani American LGBTQ+ rights activist, and was registered as a nonprofit organization in the United States until 2011.

== History ==
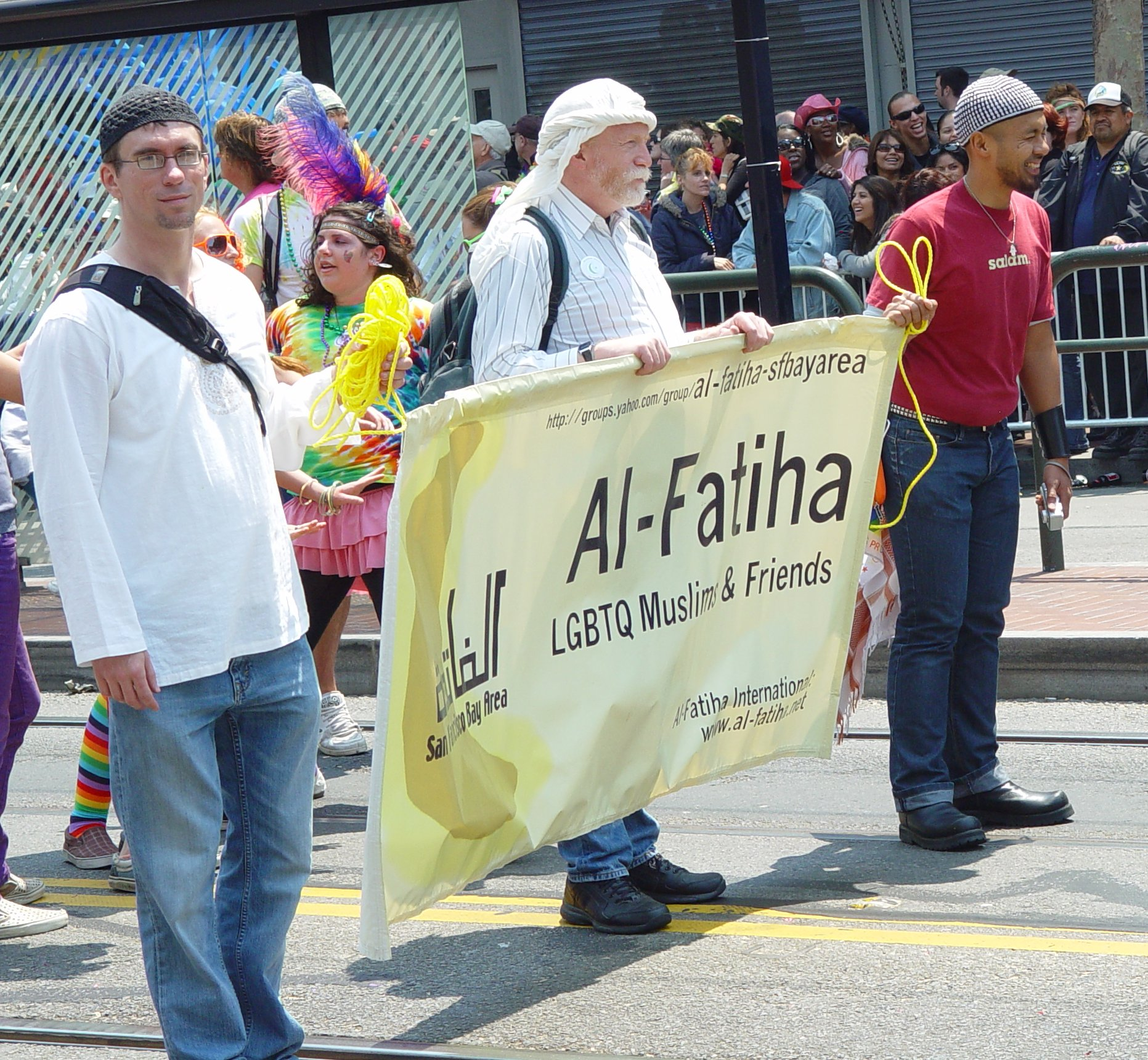
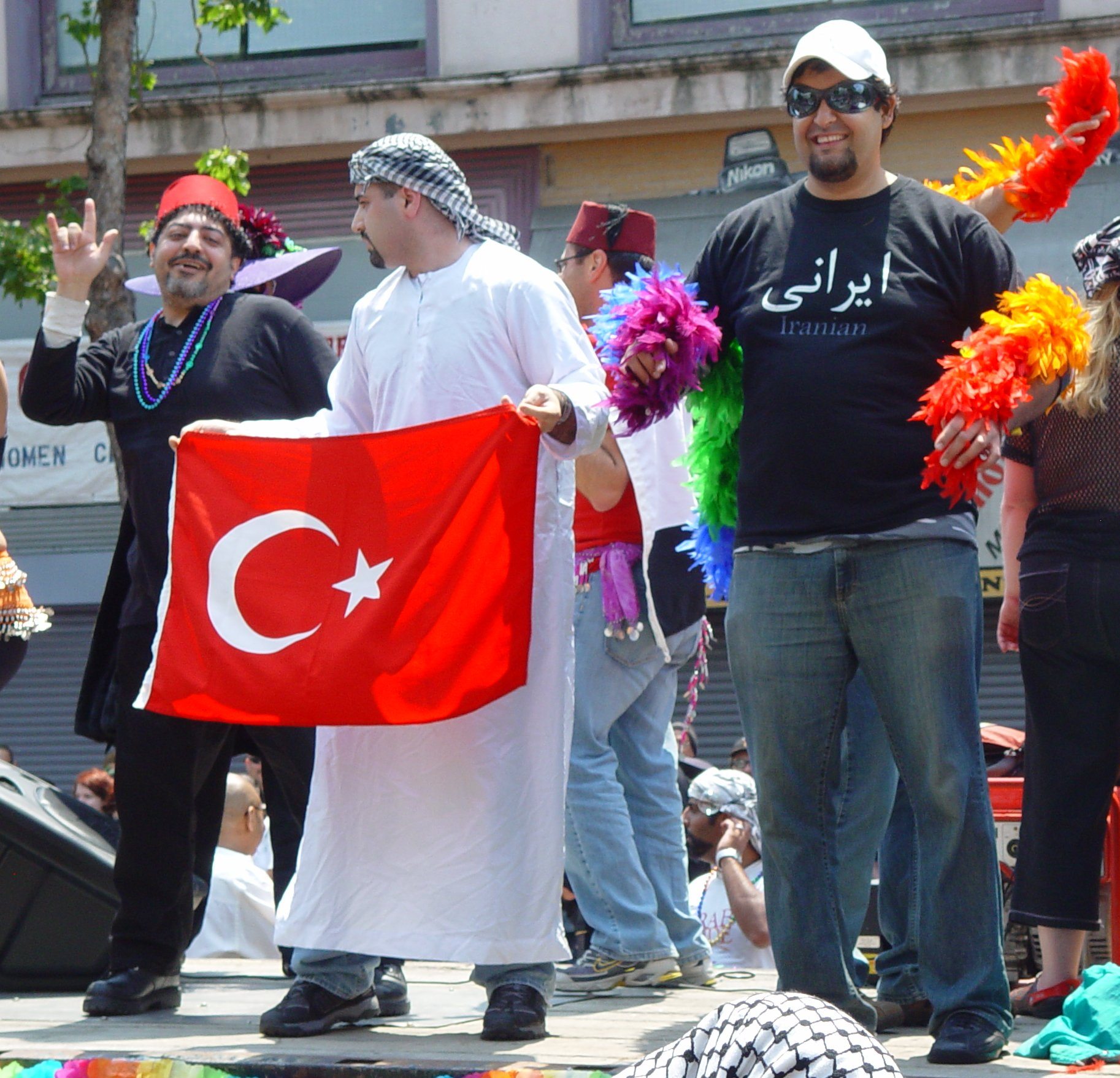
Members of Al Fatiha at the LGBT Pride parade in San Francisco 2008.

Alam founded Al-Fatiha in November 1997. The organization grew out of an internet listserve for questioning Muslims from 25 countries, and by October 1998 had developed numerous in-person chapters. At its height, Al-Fatiha had 14 chapters in the United States, as well as offices in England, Canada, Spain, Turkey, and South Africa.

The name "Al-Fatiha" means "the Opening." It is also the name of the first chapter of the Qur'an. In the beginning of that chapter ('surah'), God is described as compassionate and merciful; the organization's founders believe that these attributes characterize Islam, rather than hatred and homophobia. Each year, Al-Fatiha hosted an international membership retreat and conference. Early conferences took place in Boston, New York, London and San Francisco in the late 1990s and early 2000s, and focused on issues such as the reconciliation of religion and sexual orientation. The last Al-Fatiha conference was held in 2005 in Atlanta, Georgia.

=== 2001 death threats ===
In 2001, Al-Muhajiroun, an international organization seeking the establishment of a global Islamic caliphate, issued a fatwa declaring that all members of Al-Fatiha were murtadd, or apostates, and condemning them to death. Because of the threat and coming from conservative societies, many members of the foundation's site still prefer to be anonymous so as to protect their identity while continuing a tradition of secrecy.

=== Challenges ===
While Al-Fatiha worked to combat homophobia within Muslim communities, it also felt it faced the challenge of seeking to avoid provoking an Islamophobic reaction among non-Muslims.

After the organization's founder, Faisal Alam, stepped down, subsequent leaders failed to sustain the organization. It began a process of legal dissolution in 2011.

== See also ==
- Liberal movements in Islam
- Lut, source of Qur'anic views against homosexuality
- Homosexuality and Islam
- Board member Daayiee Abdullah
