= Daayiee Abdullah =

Gay Muslim activist (1954–2025)

- Abdullah in 2005
- Born: Sidney Thompson; January 11, 1954; Detroit, Michigan, U.S.
- Died: August 3, 2025 (aged 71); Bogotá, Colombia
- Other name: داعية عبدالله
- Education: Georgetown University (BSLA); University of Michigan (MA); University of the District of Columbia (JD)
- Occupation: Imam
- Years active: 2000–2025
- Organization(s): Muslim Alliance for Sexual and Gender Diversity, Al-Fatiha Foundation, Muslims for Progressive Values
- Known for: First American queer imam
- Website: https://daayiee.com/

Daayiee Abdullah (January 11, 1954 – August 3, 2025; Arabic: داعية عبد الله, born Sidney Thompson) was an American Imam based in Washington, D.C. Abdullah was, after the 2025 death of Muhsin Hendricks until his own death in August 2025, one of five living openly gay Imams in the world (the others being Ludovic-Mohamed Zahed of France, Mullah Taha of Iran, El-Farouk Khaki of Toronto's el-Tawhid Juma Circle/The Unity Mosque, and Nur Warsame of Australia). Abdullah was a member of and spiritual advisor of the Al-Fatiha Foundation until it closed in 2011. As a Muslim leader, Abdullah's homosexuality caused controversy due to the traditionally upheld beliefs about homosexuality in Islam.

== Early life and education ==
Abdullah was born in 1954 as Sidney Thompson in Detroit, Michigan. He was African American. His parents supported him, his six older brothers, his younger sister, and his oldest step-sister from his father's first marriage to find religion despite his parents' Southern Baptist beliefs. When he was 8 years old, he visited a synagogue, a Hindu temple, and an assortment of Christian denominations. None of these religions he had explored fit him exactly, so he continued to search for a religion he could put his faith into. He converted to Islam at age 30. When Abdullah was 15, he graduated from high school early because he had gone to summer school most summers. Along with summer school, he and his family travelled around North America so that he could see what the world was truly like. His parents believed that once a member of the family had graduated high school, he was an adult. Knowing this, Abdullah came out to his parents, and was accepted after assuring his parents that they had "done nothing wrong." Abdullah has said that he knew he was attracted to other boys at the age of five. His parents, now both deceased, were a source of inspiration and confidence for him growing up.

Abdullah was a Community Scholar at Georgetown University studying Chinese and graduated from the David A. Clarke School of Law in Washington, D.C. in 1995 as a juris doctor. He attended the Graduate School of Islamic Social Sciences in Ashburn, Virginia from 2000 to 2003, but was expelled when the school discovered he was gay.

== Activism ==
In 1978, Abdullah went to Washington D.C. for a conference because he was working for Governor Jerry Brown's office in San Francisco. In 1979, he returned to D.C. as a coordinator for the National March on Washington for Lesbian and Gay Rights. Because he was a coordinator, he went a week early and then stayed a week later for his vacation only to return a month later. After two weeks in San Francisco, he decided that he wanted to live in D.C.

In the 1980s, Abdullah began his tenure at Georgetown University and spent several years at Beijing University and Taiwan National University Beijing University. He studied the Chinese language and literature, and later Arabic, Arabic Linguistics, North African, and Middle Eastern Studies, and several years working and studying in Muslim countries. Some of his classmates were Chinese Muslims from Ürümqi, who invited him to a Beijing Mosque, the first mosque he had visited. Following that experience, at age 30, he became a Muslim and adopted the Islamic name Daayiee Abdullah. He didn't add on the title Imam until later. Abdullah would go on to study Islam in Egypt, Jordan, Saudi Arabia, and Syria.

He was the business manager at Georgetown Fitness Center from 2007 to 2009. Abdullah, under his legal name Sidney Thompson, was the CEO of Asiad & Associates, a software company in Washington, D.C.

=== Pro-LGBT activism ===
Around 2000, he joined the online Yahoo! group Muslim Gay Men. On this forum, there were many who were gay, but were intent on telling those who were seeking help that the Qur'an forbids homosexuality. Abdullah refuted these comments by explaining that one is to follow the Qur'an first and the Haddith second. Through this, he began to gain popularity among homosexuals and allies across the online community.

He began being called Imam after performing ceremonies for people who were considered pariahs in their community due to illnesses or the gender or religion of the person they wished to marry. For example, Abdullah has performed Janazah for gay Muslims who have died from AIDS-related complications.

Abdullah also performed same-sex marriages for men and women and counseling for all couples—heterosexual and homosexual. He has also married religiously differing couples who are from the Abrahamic faith. Because the Abrahamic faiths are sister religions, and because the Qu'ran says that Abrahamic believers can interact with other Abrahamic believers, Abdullah believed that it is plausible to marry between Abrahamic religions. In 2015, Abdullah reported having officiated 65 marriages.

Since 2000, Abdullah has provided specialized counseling services for Muslims from a wide spectrum of Muslim religious and cultural backgrounds.

Abdullah was Director of LGBT Outreach at Muslims for Progressive Values from 2010 until 2014 and remained on the advisory board of Muslims for Progressive Values. He also held a position in Oslo, Norway at Skeiv Verden ("Gay World").

Abdullah was a board member of the round table of the Al-Fatiha Foundation for several years. From 2011 to 2012, he served as part of the Queer Muslim Working Group, which evolved into the Muslim Alliance for Sexual and Gender Diversity in 2013. Abdullah also has served on the planning team for the LGBT Muslim Retreat since 2011.

=== Masjid Nur Al-Isslaah ===
Abdullah created an LGBT-friendly masjid in Washington D.C in 2011, called Masjid Nur Al-Isslaah (English: "Mosque for Enlightenment and Reformation" or "Light of Reform Mosque"), of which he was the imam and religious director. The mosque was initially hosted by a public library in D.C., with a plan to raise funds to create a purpose-built mosque of their own.

=== MECCA Institute ===
In 2015, Abdullah founded the Mecca Institute, a self-described "inclusive and progressive online Islamic seminary," in Washington D.C.

He launched its online progressive Islamic seminary program in August 2017 and expanded it in 2019 to include an Islamic continuing education department tailored for modern, multifaith, and secular societies.

== Personal life ==
In 2006, Abdullah was in a long-term relationship of ten years. His partner was Christian, which is one of the reasons he performed religious ceremonies between Abrahamic religions.

As of 2015, Abdullah was declared single, claiming that the pressure on his closeted partner was too much for the relationship.

== Publications ==
On March 5, 2021, Abdullah published the book “Progressive Islam: The Rich Liberal Ideas of the Muslim Faith.” The book focuses on liberal ideas of the Muslim faith, such as freedom, cooperation, responsibility, and opportunity throughout its five sections, which cover the Qur’an, the Prophet Muhammad, diverse perspectives on Islam, and a short autobiography of Abdullah himself.

== See also ==
- African American Muslim converts
- Islam in Washington, D.C.
- LGBT in Islam
- Al-Fatiha Foundation Fatwa
