= Women as imams =

There is a difference of opinion among Muslims regarding the circumstances in which women may act as imams, i.e. to lead a mixed gendered congregation in salat (prayer).

A small number of schools of Islamic thought make exceptions for tarawih (optional Ramadan prayers) or for a congregation consisting only of close relatives. Women acting as leaders, teachers, and authorities in other capacities however is not deviating from the Islamic orthodoxy, as women have never been restricted from becoming scholars, ulema, jurists, muftis, preachers, missionaries, or spiritual guides. There is a long history of female masters of Islamic sciences teaching men.

Historically, certain sects have considered it acceptable for women to function as imams. This was true not only in the Arab heartland of early Islam, but in China over recent centuries, where women's mosques developed. The debate has been reactivated during the 21st century as the west and the world revisit sexism. Those critical of the ruling that women cannot lead congressional prayers have argued that the spirit of the Qur'an and the letter of a da'if (weak) hadith (saying of Mohammed) indicate that women should be able to lead mixed (albeit children) congregations, as opposed to sex-segregated congregations, and they suggest that the prohibition against the practice originated from sexism in the medieval environment and from inaccurate patriarchal interpretations of religious texts, rather than from a spirit of "true Islam".

== Precedents ==
The Qur'an does not address this issue; relevant precedents are therefore sought for in the hadith, the traditions attributed to Muhammad; the sunnah, his actions, including but not limited to hadith; and the principle of ijma, consensus.

An indirectly relevant hadith is widely considered to be crucial, since the imam stands at the front of the congregation. The hadith in question is #881 of Sahih Muslim: "Abu Huraira said: The best rows for men are the first rows, as opposed to the last ones, and the best rows for women are the last ones as opposed to the first ones."

The hadith of Umm Waraqa has given rise to debates among Islamic leaders on whether it is acceptable or not for women to lead prayers, including mixed-gender congregational prayer. Umm Waraqa bint Abdallah, an Ansari woman, who knew the entire Quran, was instructed by Muhammad to lead ahl dariha, which consisted of both men and women, in prayer. The Arabic phrase means "the people of her home", but the ambiguity hangs on the exact translation of dar, "home", which can refer to one's residence, neighborhood, or village. The "people of Umm Waraqa’s home" were so numerous that Muhammad appointed a muezzin to call them to prayer. Umm Waraqa was one of the few to hand down the Quran before it was recorded in writing. She could do so because she had memorized the entire corpus.

The use of the word dar in the hadith, when speaking of where the prayer was held, has resulted in different interpretations. A general translation is "area", constituting the community around where Umm Waraqa lived. This idea is not accepted by many scholars. Another translation of dar is "household", which would mean that Umm Waraqa led prayers in her home. Who was she leading? Imam Zaid presents three possibilities: the two servants of her household and the mu'ahdhin, or the women of her surrounding “area”, or only the women of her household. Each of these possibilities requires certain assumptions, but the most accepted is that Umm Waraqa was leading the women of her household, thus leading to the conclusion that women are allowed to lead prayers of all-female congregations. Zaid insists that if Muhammed established a mosque in the household of a man, which was not uncommon, Itban b. Malik, then he must also have set up women-only congregations.

With regard to women leading congregations of women, however, several hadith report that two of Muhammad's wives, Aisha and Umm Salamah, did so, and as a result most madhhabs support this. According to Qaradawi:

The hadith of `A’ishah and Umm Salamah (may Allah be pleased with them). `Abdur-Raziq (5086), Ad-Daraqutni (1/404) and Al-Bayhaqi (3/131) reported from the narration of Abu Hazim Maysarah ibn Habib from Ra’itah Al-Hanafiyyah from `A’ishah that she led women in Prayer and stood among them in an obligatory Prayer. Moreover, Ibn Abi Shaybah (2/89) reported from the chain of narrators of Ibn Abi Layla from `Ata’ that `A’ishah used to say the Adhan, the Iqamah, and lead women in Prayer while standing among them in the same row. Al-Hakim also reported the same hadith from the chain of narrators of Layth Ibn Abi Sulaim from `Ata’, and the wording of the hadith mentioned here is Al-Hakim’s.

Furthermore, Ash-Shafi`i (315), Ibn Abi Shaybah (88/2) and `Abdur-Raziq (5082) reported from two chains of narrators that report the narration of `Ammar Ad-Dahni in which he stated that a woman from his tribe named Hujayrah narrated that Umm Salamh used to lead women in Prayer while standing among them in the same row.

The wording of `Abdur-Raziq for the same hadith is as follows: “Umm Salamah led us (women) in the `Asr Prayer and stood among us (in the same row).”

In addition, Al-Hafiz said in Ad-Dirayah (1/169), “Muhammad ibn Al-Husain reported from the narration of Ibrahim An-Nakh`i that `A’ishah used to lead women in Prayer during the month of Ramadan while standing among them in the same row.

Further, `Abdur-Raziq reported (5083) from the narration of Ibrahim ibn Muhammad from Dawud ibn Al-Husain from `Ikrimah from Ibn `Abbas that the latter said, “A woman can lead women in Prayer while standing between them.”

All of the hadiths state that the given woman leads the other women in prayers while standing among them in the same row, and not standing on the first row of the prayers as imams do. They further state that they were among only women, not male worshippers.

Aside from the hadith, there are other sources to consider. The sunnah is a more general source of precedent; it is usually considered to count against women leading mixed congregations, as there are no reports of it happening in Muhammad's time, unless, as Amina Wadud suggested, the aforementioned Umm Waraqa hadith is interpreted to apply to her town rather than to her household alone.

A third source of precedent is the principle of ijma—consensus—supported by the hadith "My community will never agree upon an error." This is also generally quoted against the idea of women leading mixed congregations, since the consensus of the traditional jurists is overwhelmingly against the concept; however, supporters of the idea argue that this consensus is not universal.

One of the most authoritative overviews of the viewpoints of the classical jurists on whether women may lead the prayer or not is "Whether to Keep Women out of the Mosque: A Survey of Medieval Islamic Law" written by Christopher Melchert.

== Women-only congregations ==
Schools differ on whether a woman may be imam (leader) of a jama'ah (congregational) prayer if the congregation consists of women alone. Three of the four Sunni madhhabs—Shafi'is, Hanafis, and Hanbalis—allow this, although Hanafis consider it to be makrooh, a disliked act. (The fourth division, Malikis, do not permit women to lead women in prayer.) Where it is allowed, the woman stands among the congregation in the front row, instead of alone in front of the congregation. In 2000, six maraji among Iran's Shia leadership declared that they too allowed women to lead a woman-only congregation, reversing a previous ban in that country.

An unusual feature of Islam in China is the existence of nüsi, mosques solely for women. The imams and all the congregants are women and men are not allowed into the buildings. A handful of women have been trained as imams in order to serve these mosques. However, in at least some communities where these mosques operated, women were not allowed in the men's mosques. In recent years, efforts have been made to establish similar mosques in India and Iran.

== Mixed-gender congregations ==
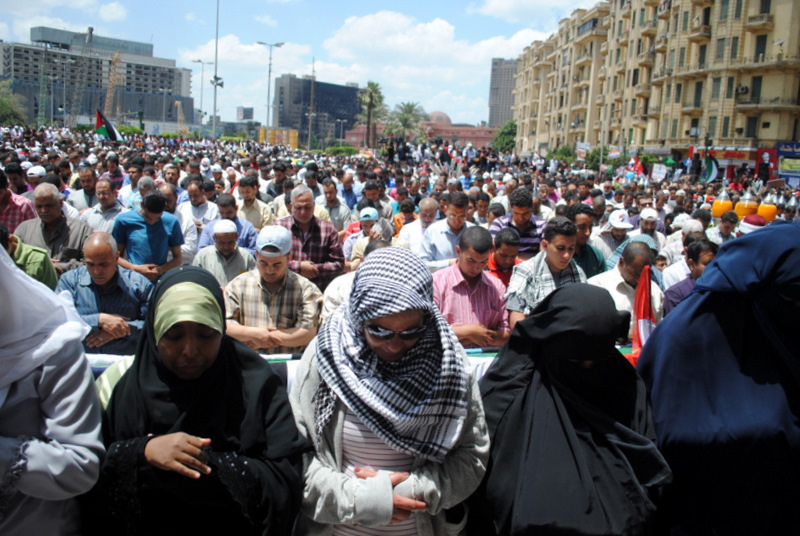
Egyptian demonstrators in Tahrir Square, Cairo at prayer. Unusually, the women are in front of the men.

On the basis of the following interpretation of the Qur'an, Ibn al-Arabi, a Sufi scholar, said female prayer leadership is absolutely permissible.

There are those who unconditionally permit women to lead men [in prayer], which is my opinion as well. There are those who completely forbid her from such leadership and there are those who permit her to lead women, but not men. The reasoning (behind the unconditional permission) is that [Muhammad] testified that some women attained perfection just as he testified regarding some men—even though the latter were more than the former... a women's leadership (in prayer) is sound... and one should not listen to those who prohibit it without proof, for there is no text to support their claim" - Abu 'Abd Allah Muhammad b. 'Ali b. Muhammad Ibn al-' Arabi, Al-Futuhat Al Makiyya.

Within the household, if no qualified man is present, is the one exception for women to lead men in prayers. Modern Islamic scholars such as Dr. Yusuf Al-Qaradawi, based on the Umm Waraqah hadith mentioned above, consider it permissible for a knowledgeable woman to lead mixed prayers within her own household, as he considers this to largely obviate the danger of the men being aroused by her presence.

In the early years of Islam, the Haruriyyah sect, a branch of the Kharijites movement, founded by Habib ibn-Yazīd al-Harūrī, held that it was permissible to entrust the imamate to a woman if she were able to carry out the required duties. Not only did she lead Muslim men in prayer, she recited the two longest chapters in the Quran during that prayer.

Well-known early jurists—including Al-Tabari (838–932), historian, exegete and founder of a now defunct juristic school; Abu Thawr (764–854), mufti of Iraq; Al-Muzani (791–878); and Ibn Arabi (1165–1240)—considered the practice permissible at least for optional (nafl salat) prayers.

A few fatwas exist permitting women to lead a mixed gender congregation regardless of familial relationship. For instance, Dr. Khaled Abou El Fadl recommends that the placement of the imam be made with greater modesty in mind for a female imam. Some traditional scholars caution against Yusuf Qaradawi's methodology and regard him as excessively lenient as he does not limit himself to the positions of the four Sunni schools of fiqh.

Adding to the arguments in favor of woman-led prayer of mixed congregations, Laury Silvers and Ahmed Elewa recently published a detailed article in the Journal of Law and Religion arguing that female imams are permissible in all circumstances. Their abstract reads:

This paper, written five years after the Wadud prayer, presents a survey and analysis of the various responses to female led mixed-gender congregational prayers as well as a legal argument for its default permissibility. We show that, in interpreting the Hadiths on woman-led prayer, Sunni schools of law hold a range of opinions on its permissibility. We discuss how Muslim jurists consider historical needs in their rulings, the role of female modesty in this debate, and the nature of juristic consensus. We present our own argument that unrestricted female prayer leadership is legal by default rather than an innovation as many critics have charged. Finally, we set out our own different positions on the propriety of Muslim women asserting their inclusion in the current situation.

== In individual countries ==
=== Algeria ===
The first female imam was recruited in 1993 during the Algerian Civil War. Appointed by the Ministry of Religious Affairs, they all have at least a bachelor's degree in Islamic sciences and a thorough knowledge of the Quran. There were around 500 of them in 2015.

=== Bahrain ===
A woman disguised as a man attempted to deliver a Jum'ah khutbah but was detected by members of the congregation and arrested by the Bahraini police. The incident occurred at one of the biggest mosques in the island state, in front of 7,000 worshippers, on the last Friday of Ramadan in 2004. The would-be khatib, wearing full male dress with a false beard and moustache, sat on the mimbar just before speaking, at which point some worshippers realised that the new imam was a woman in disguise. They and the mosque's imam, Sheikh Adnan Al-Qattan, handed the 40-year-old woman over to the police.

=== Canada ===
Canadian Muslims have been active in the woman-led prayer movement since 2003 when El-Farouk Khaki organized a woman-led prayer with Ghazala Anwar leading for the Salaam/al-Fatiha International Conference. In 2004, United Muslim Association UMA demonstrated its commitment to having women deliver the sermon and lead the prayer.

In that year, 20-year-old Maryam Mirza delivered the second half of the Eid al-Fitr khutbah at the Etobicoke mosque in Toronto, run by the UMA. Later the same year, Yasmin Shadeer led the night isha prayer with her male and female congregants.

In April 2005, Raheel Raza led Toronto's first woman-led mixed-gender Friday service, delivering the khutbah and leading the prayers of the congregation. The event was organized by the Muslim Canadian Congress to celebrate Earth Day, and was held in the backyard of the downtown Toronto home of activist Tarek Fatah. In July 2005, Pamela K. Taylor, a Muslim convert since 1986, gave the Friday khutbah and led the mixed-gender prayers at the UMA Toronto mosque at the invitation of the Muslim Canadian Congress on Canada Day. In addition to leading the prayers, Taylor also gave a sermon on the importance of equality among people regardless of gender, race, sexual orientation, and/or disability, marking the first occasion where a Muslim woman led prayers in an official mosque. In 2006, the former Mufti of Marseille, Soheib Bencheikh, requested that either Raza or Taylor lead him in prayer, which Imam Taylor did during a visit to Canada in February 2006. The prayers were sponsored by the Muslim Canadian Congress and held in a private venue with a mixed gender congregation. In 2007, Imam Taylor led prayers for International Woman's Day hosted by the Canadian Muslim Union

From 2008, the Noor Cultural Centre in Toronto has included women on their Board of Khatibs, and women and men alternate giving the call to prayer each week. Women regularly give full length sermons prior to the second adhan, with a male khatib delivering the Arabic portion in brief after the second call until 2012. In 2012, the Noor began having women give the full sermon including the Arabic portions.

In 2009, academic Laury Silvers, activist/lawyer El-Farouk Khaki and artist Troy Jackson founded the Toronto Unity Mosque, the foundation mosque of El-Tawhid Juma Circle, in downtown Toronto. The circle is gender-equal, LGBTQ-affirming, and religiously non-discriminatory. All Muslims are welcome to lead the prayer and give the sermon. It helps set up similar circles when asked: The first two sister circles were founded in Washington, D.C., and Atlanta, Georgia in early 2011. These two communities are now associated with Muslims for Progressive Values (see United States section). Since then, Montréal, Quebec, London, Ontario, and Vancouver, British Columbia have also established gender-equal/LGBTQ-affirming prayer communities with the El-Tawhid Juma Circle.

Muslims for Progressive Values Canada, an affiliate of Muslims for Progressive Values USA, founded in 2010 by Shahla Khan Salter (chair) leads mixed congregational prayers in Ottawa, Canada. Prayers for MPV Canada have been led by women, including Farhat Rehman and by Zeinab A.

=== China ===
A unique feature of Islam in China is the presence of female-only mosques. Among the Hui people, but not other Muslim ethnic minorities such as the Uyghurs, Quranic schools for girls evolved into woman-only mosques and women acted as imams as early as 1820. These imams are known as nü ahong (女阿訇), i.e. "female akhoond", and they guide female Muslims in worship and prayer. Ahong Du Shuzhen of Kaifeng became the first woman in Henan to perform the Hajj in 1992.

Due to Beijing having tight control over religious practices, Chinese Muslims are isolated from Islamic world trends. According to Dr Khaled Abou el Fadl from the University of California in Los Angeles, this explains the situation whereby female imams can exist in China, as they often tend to develop their own institutions in isolation due to increased control over their practices from the central Chinese government. Such developments in the Islamic community in China, such as that of female imams, are often contrary to the overwhelming opinion within the Muslim World proper. There is no historical evidence for female imams in China before the early 1800s.

=== Denmark ===
The Mariam mosque in Copenhagen, which was founded by Sherin Khankan in February 2016, has only female imams. The mosque is open to male and female worshippers, with the exception of Friday prayers, which are only open to female worshippers. Khankan became Scandinavia's first female imam when she opened the mosque.

=== France ===
In 2019, Eva Janadin, Anne-Sophie Monsinay and Kahina Bahloul became the first female imams to lead Muslim prayers in France.

=== Germany ===
Rabeya Müller (1957–2024) was a pioneer of Islam in Germany as one of the first female imams. She was a liberal Islamic theologian.

=== India ===
In 2018, Jamida Beevi, a woman from Malappuram district in Kerala became the first woman imam in the country to lead the Jumu'ah prayer and Qutuba (sermons) for women and men.

=== Morocco ===
Kathleen O'Connor noted in 2009 that a madrasa in Morocco had started training women as Islamic guides (mourchidats). Although, O'Conner's entry may refer to the training of women for pastoral roles as local preachers, not as prayer leaders.

The Italian researcher Sara Borrillo studies the 2004 reform of Moroccan Ministry of Islamic Affairs that institutionalized official women preachers with the task to teach other women the "right" Islam in the mosques. The first official training for mourchidates was established in 2005 and each year since then 50 mourchidates are trained, together with 150 men preachers that could become imam. No woman in Morocco could become imam nor guide a mixed group in Friday prayer. Women can only lead other women in prayer in private spaces.

=== Netherlands ===
Since 2015 "Avant-garde" female imam and artist, Salima el Musalima, has led prayers in the Netherlands.

=== South Africa ===
One of the earliest reported cases of a woman imam in the West occurred in 1995 in Johannesburg, South Africa. For about two years, a congregation met every Friday for the Jum'ah prayer and every night in Ramadan for the special tarāwīh prayer in a building owned by the Muslim Youth Movement of South Africa (MYM). The khutbah for the Jumu'ah was delivered by either a male or female khatib and the imams for the prayer also included men and women. One of the prime movers behind this congregation was Muslim women's rights activist Shamima Shaikh. In January 1998, as per her wishes, one of her four funeral prayers was led by her friend, who was also a woman, Farhana Ismail.

South African Muslims heard their first female-led Jum'ah khutbah in 1994 when African-American Islamic studies professor Amina Wadud spoke at the Claremont Main Road Mosque in Cape Town, an experience she discusses in Inside the Gender Jihad. Since then, both that mosque and Masjidul Islam in Johannesburg often have women speakers for jum'ah. Since 1994, many South African and foreign women have been hosted in these two mosques.

In 2003, a new venue for Eid prayer was established in Durban, designed to allow families to attend the Eid prayer together in a pleasant and comfortable atmosphere. It is run by Taking Islam to the People. At each Eid salaah there are two khutbahs delivered, one by a male and one by a female. Over the seven years from 2003 to 2010, fourteen women have offered khutbah, including Dr. Lubna Nadvi, Zaytun Suleyman, Fatima Seedat, Fatima Hendricks, Dr Mariam Seedat and Zulaykha Mayat.

In 2005, Farhana Ismail first officiated at a nikah (wedding) ceremony. She has trained other women to do so; since 2006, Fatima Seedat has officiated at three such ceremonies.

=== Spain ===
Spanish Muslims have been some of the greatest supporters of the woman-led prayer movement. Spanish imam Abdennur Prado responded immediately to the controversial prayer by American Amina Wadud (see USA section) with a supportive legal opinion. He was one of the organisers of the October 2005 Islamic feminism conference in Barcelona, the first attended by men and women from around the world, at which Wadud led a mixed gender congregational prayer. In 2010, another visiting academic, South African Dr. Sa'diyya Shaikh, gave the khutbah and led the Friday prayer for a mixed congregation.

=== Turkey ===
Turkish Muslims are conscious of their influence in interpreting Islam. The state-run mosques have trained hundreds of women as vaizes, a term translated by the BBC as "senior imams" and by the Washington Times as "female preachers". The WT says, "As well as being preachers, women now have the right to lead groups on the annual pilgrimage to Mecca, and 15 Turkish provinces have women serving as deputy muftis—specialists on religious law who monitor the work of imams in mosques. Significantly, given that 70 percent of requests for advice come from women, the assistant muftis have the right to issue fatwas, or religious opinions." According to the Christian Science Monitor, in 2005 "Diyanet, a government body that oversees the country's mosques and trains religious leaders, added 150 women preachers across Turkey" and has moved on to "selecting a group of women who will serve as deputies to muftis, or expounders of religious law. From this post, they'll monitor the work being done by imams in local mosques, particularly as it relates to women."

=== United Kingdom ===
British Muslims had their first chance to hear a female-led mixed-gender salat in 2008, when the American scholar Amina Wadud performed the Friday prayer at Oxford's Wolfson College. In 2010 Raheel Raza became the first Muslim-born woman to lead a mixed-gender British congregation through Friday prayers. Amina Wadud returned to the UK to lead a mixed-gender prayer on March 6, 2015, with Inclusive Mosque Initiative (IMI). IMI was set up in 2012 by Tamsila Tauqir and Dervla Zeynab Shannahan. At IMI women, nonbinary, genderqueer and male people lead mixed prayers.

In 2021, Zara Mohammed became the first female leader of the Muslim Council of Britain. When pressed on BBC Radio 4's Woman's Hour over the number of female imams in Britain, she instead chose to focus on other issues. Many Muslim women celebrated her appointment, and urged her to include more minority groups within MCB's membership and supported her focus on addressing the impact of the coronavirus pandemic on Muslims in the UK.

=== United States ===
Ghazala Anwar led a mixed-gender prayer at the al-Fatiha conference in New York City, in 1999. Pamela Taylor (a convert to Islam and co-founder of Muslims for Progressive Values) held one of the first woman-led mixed prayers around 2005. Taylor believed that men and women should be perceived and treated as equal under Islam which prompted the woman-led mixed prayer on International Women's Day. She also spoke against the exclusion of women in the mosque which is supposed to considered a place of God. In interviews, she has focused on the inequality of locations regarding where women pray; for instance, they are not permitted to pray in main prayer halls and other locations are very crowded with low-quality sound systems. Furthermore, children are also forced into the women's sector of the mosque which make it highly difficult for the women to concentrate while praying. However, it is believed that the first woman in Canada to lead a mixed-prayer is Canadian journalist, Raheel Raza. Raza has also become the first Muslim woman to also lead a mixed-gender predominantly British group. Her prayers and work within the British congregation has allowed scholars to question the relationship between female leadership and the Islamic religion.

In 2005, African-American Islamic scholar Amina Wadud led a congregation in Friday prayer and gave a sermon in New York City. Another woman sounded the call to prayer, while not wearing a headscarf, and no curtain divided the men and women. This was not the first woman-led mixed-gender congregational prayer (see the above noted events), but it was the first to gain national and international attention. The prayer was the "shot across the bow" that galvanized conversations and action concerning women's place in the mosque ultimately leading to the ISNA pamphlet "Women Friendly Mosque Initiative" and websites such as Side Entrance, increased presence of women in mosques in positions of authority, and most recently the woman-only mosque Women's Mosque of America.

The Progressive Muslim Union followed the Wadud prayer with a woman-led prayer initiative. The initiative sought to bring together the varied progressive opinions on the prayer as well as engage more conservative Muslims by encouraging further debate, highlighting legal opinions in support of the prayer (as well as giving space to the overwhelming negative opinions), facilitating Muslims who would like to organize future prayers, and documenting those events as they heard of them. Progressives and others sympathetic to bringing about a transformation of gender privilege in Islam continue to work for the establishment of woman-led prayer.

Many perceived the Wadud prayer to be an inevitable reaction to the deplorable situation of women in mosques in North America. The attention garnered by the event forced more conservative Muslim organizations to publicly acknowledge the situation and call for changes. ISNA responded with guidelines for women-friendly mosques. Scholars such as Imam Zaid Shakir and Dr. Louay M. Safi have been calling attention to and working to change mosque conditions for years. Progressives and others would argue, though, that mosque conditions are merely a symptom of a widespread sense of male entitlement following centuries of male privilege in the intellectual and political power centers of Islam.

Women continue to lead prayers in the United States in their communities with or without media coverage: Nakia Jackson led Eid prayers in 2006 and 2007, with Laury Silvers giving the khutba. When Nakia Jackson led Laury Silvers in prayer, Silvers was a Muslim and a professor at Skidmore College teaching Islam; it was her first time having a prayer led by a woman in which it was Nakia Jackson. Jackson's leadership as a female in Islam allowed women to challenge the norms of Islamic culture and sparked a movement to break traditional barriers. Ultimately, the end goal was to develop a community and global movement that would stimulate and encourage Islamic female leadership that is equal to those of men. Qalbu Maryam Women's Mosque, established in Berkeley California is one of the few progressive mosques in the USA that is also inclusive of all people, Founder Rabi'a Keeble has acted as Imam on some occasions but insists that women should learn to lead prayer, call to prayer, and all aspects of participation once held only for males.

Since early 2006, Muslims for Progressive Values has had a continuous gender-equal prayer space in West Hollywood, California. Both men and women are allowed to lead prayers and deliver a khutba. Although congregants may choose to position themselves wherever they like, there is no gender segregation policy during prayer. The first dedicated gender-equal prayer space in the United States was founded by Fatima Thompson and Imam Daayiee Abdullah in Washington D.C., as a sister mosque to the El-Tawhid Juma Circle founded two years previously in Toronto (see above). Imam Pamela K. Taylor led the DC congregation prayers for Eid Ul Adha in 2010 at the All Souls Church. She also gave the inaugural sermon for the MPV mosque in Columbus, OH in 2012 with a sermon focused on God's Love.

In 2015, the Women's Mosque of America opened in Los Angeles, California, which includes female imams.

== See also ==
- Christopher Melchert
- Theology and feminism
- Imam
- Ijtihad#Female mujtahids
- Liberal movements within Islam
- Ordination of women
- Sex segregation in Islam
- Shia Imam
- Tynnetta Muhammad
- Women in Islam
