= PMU =

PMU may refer to:

- Paracelsus Private Medical University of Salzburg
- Periyar Maniammai University, in Tamil Nadu, India, now Periyar Maniammai Institute of Science & Technology
- Permanent makeup
- Phasor measurement unit, a measurement device in power systems to estimate magnitude and phase angle of time-varying electric signals
- Police MRT Unit, Singapore Police Force
- Pomeranian Medical University
- Popular Mobilization Forces or Popular Mobilization Units, Iraqi state-sponsored umbrella organization of Shia-dominated militias
- Power Management Unit, an integrated circuit on some computers that controls power-related features
- Pump Me Up, type of kite used in kiteboarding/kitesurfing
- Pregnant mare urine
- Presbyterian Missionary Union
- Prince Mohammad bin Fahd University
- Progressive Muslim Union
- Pari Mutuel Urbain, betting company with a monopoly on horse race betting in France
