= Syrian Americans =

Ethnic group

أمريكيون سوريون
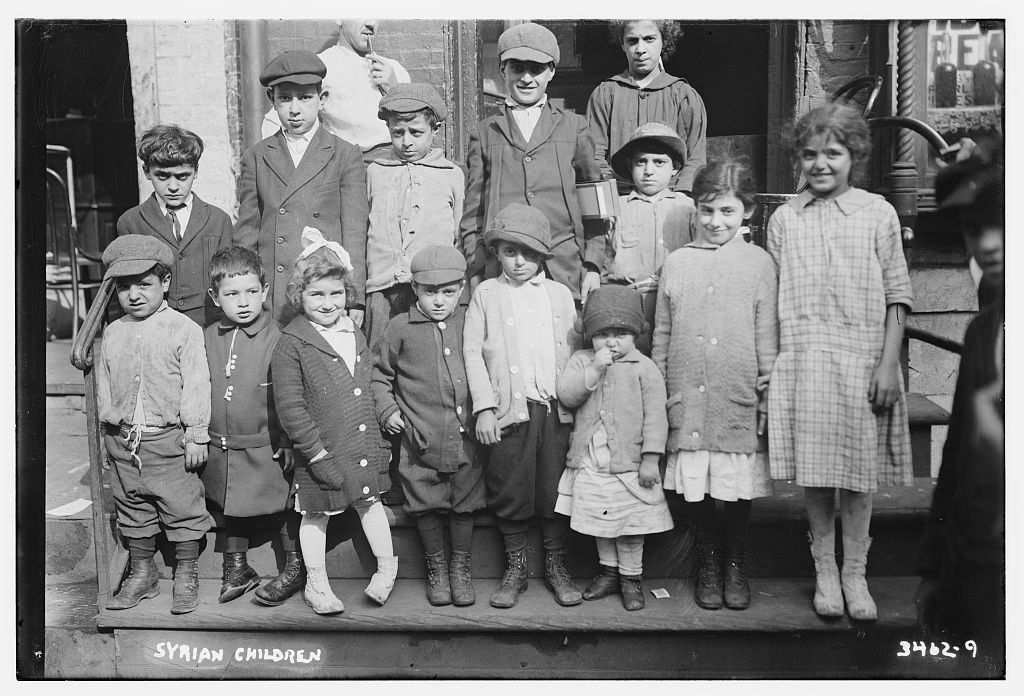
- Syrian children between 1910 and 1915

Total population
- 187,331

Regions with significant populations
- New Jersey, Tennessee, New York, Massachusetts, Michigan, Louisiana, Pennsylvania, Ohio, Iowa, Texas, California, Florida (especially Jacksonville)

Languages
- American English, Hebrew, Arabic (variants of Syrian Arabic), Kurdish, Neo-Aramaic, Armenian, French, other languages

Religion
- Majority: Christianity (Eastern Catholic, Eastern Orthodox, and Oriental Orthodox); Significant minorities: Sunni Islam, Druze, and Judaism

Syrian Americans (Arabic: أمريكيون سوريون) are Americans of Syrian descent or background. The first significant wave of Syrian immigrants to arrive in the United States began in the 1880s. Many of the earliest Syrian Americans settled in New York City, Boston, and Detroit. Immigration from Syria to the United States suffered a long hiatus after the United States Congress passed the Immigration Act of 1924, which restricted immigration. More than 40 years later, the Immigration Act of 1965, abolished the quotas and immigration from Syria to the United States saw a surge. An estimated 64,600 Syrians immigrated to the United States between 1961 and 2000. Additionally, between 2011 and 2024, amid the Syrian civil war, an estimated 50,004 Syrian refugees immigrated to the United States.

The overwhelming majority of Syrian immigrants to the U.S. from 1880 to 1960 were Christian, a minority were Jewish, whereas Muslim Syrians arrived in the United States chiefly after 1965. According to the 2016 American Community Survey 1-year estimates, there were 187,331 Americans who claimed Syrian ancestry, about 12% of the Arab population in the United States. There are also sizeable minority populations from Syria in the U.S. including Jews, Kurds, Armenians, Assyrians, and Circassians.

== History ==
=== American Revolutionary War ===
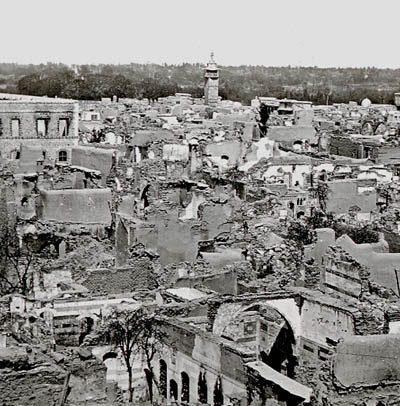
The Christian quarter of Damascus, which was destroyed in the 1860 civil war

The earliest known Syrian and first Arab to die for the United States was Private Nathan Badeen, an immigrant from Ottoman Syria who died fighting British forces during the American Revolutionary War on May 23, 1776, a month and a half prior to the unanimous signing of the Declaration of Independence by the Second Continental Congress in Philadelphia on July 4 of that year.

=== 20th century ===
The first major wave of Syrian immigrants arrived in the United States from Ottoman Syria in the period between 1889 and 1914. A small number were also Palestinians.

According to historian Philip Hitti, approximately 90,000 "Syrians" arrived in the United States between 1899 and 1919. An estimated 1,000 official entries per year came from the governorates of Damascus and Aleppo, which are governorates in modern-day Syria, in the period between 1900 and 1916. Early immigrants settled mainly in Eastern United States, in the cities of New York, Boston, Detroit, Cleveland, and the Paterson, New Jersey, area. Until 1899, all migrants from the Ottoman Empire registered as "Turks" when entering the U.S. When "Syrian" became available as a designation at the turn of the 20th century., 3,708 migrants from the region registered as Syrians, only 28 as Turks. In the 1920s, the majority of immigrants from Mount Lebanon began to refer to themselves as Lebanese instead of "Syrians".

Like most immigrants to the U.S., Syrians were motivated to pursue the American Dream of economic success. Many Christian Syrians had immigrated to the U.S. seeking religious freedom and an escape from Ottoman hegemony, and to escape the massacres and bloody conflicts that targeted Christians in particular, after the 1860 Mount Lebanon civil war and the massacres of 1840 and 1845 and the Assyrian genocide. Thousands of immigrants returned to Syria after making money in the United States; these immigrants told tales which inspired further waves of immigrants. Many settlers also sent for their relatives.

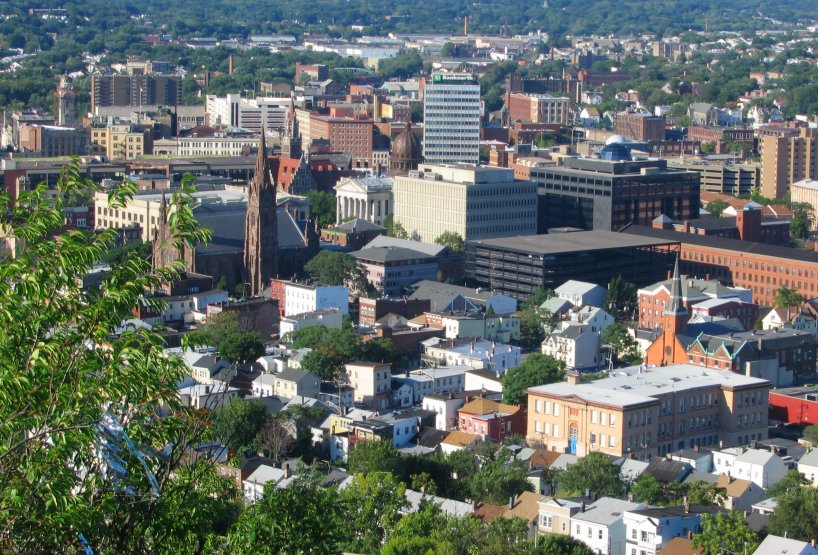
Paterson, New Jersey, home to the second-largest Syrian American population after New York City

Although the number of Syrian immigrants was not sizable, the Ottoman government set constraints on emigration in order to maintain its populace in Greater Syria. The U.S. Congress passed the Immigration Act of 1924, which greatly reduced Syrian immigration to the United States. However, the quotas were annulled by the Immigration Act of 1965, which opened the doors again to Syrian immigrants. 4,600 Syrians immigrated to the United States in the mid-1960s. Due to the Arab-Israeli and religious conflicts in Syria during this period, many Syrians immigrated to the United States seeking a democratic haven, where they could live in freedom without political suppression. An estimated 64,600 Syrians immigrated to the United States in the period between 1961 and 2000, of which ten percent have been admitted under the refugee acts. Between 2011 and 2015, the U.S. received 1,500 Syrian refugees fleeing the war in their country.

=== 21st century ===
In 2016, the country received 10,000 more refugees. However, the Trump administration banned Syrian migration to the U.S., as well as the migration of any refugee in 2017.

== Demography ==
According to the 2023 American Community Survey, there are 198,731 Americans of Syrian ancestry living in the United States. New York City has the highest concentration of Syrian Americans in the United States. Other urban areas, including Paterson, New Jersey, Allentown, Boston, Cleveland, Dearborn, New Orleans, Toledo, Cedar Rapids, and Houston have large Syrian populations.

== Assimilation ==
=== Pre-1965 ===
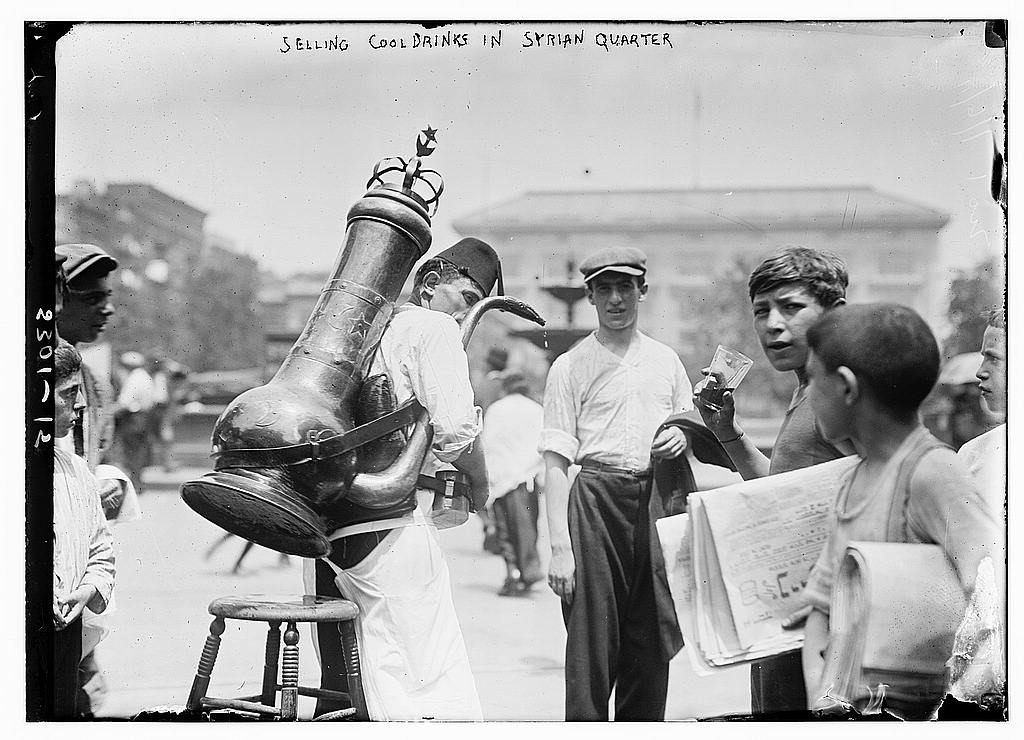
Syrian man selling cold drinks in Lower Manhattan, 1916

The traditional clothing of the first Syrian immigrants in the United States, along with their occupation as peddlers, led to some xenophobia. Scholars such as Oswaldo Truzzi have speculated that this work ultimately helped Syrian integration into the United States by accelerating cultural contact and English language skills. It has been estimated that nearly 80% of first generation Syrian women worked as street merchants. They and their children were often negatively stigmatized as "street Arabs" or inaccurately assumed to be unmarried mothers or prostitutes. In 1907, Congressman John L. Burnett called Syrians "the most undesirable of the undesirable peoples of Asia Minor" and such stigmas appear again in a 1929 survey in Boston that associated Syrians with "lying and deception".

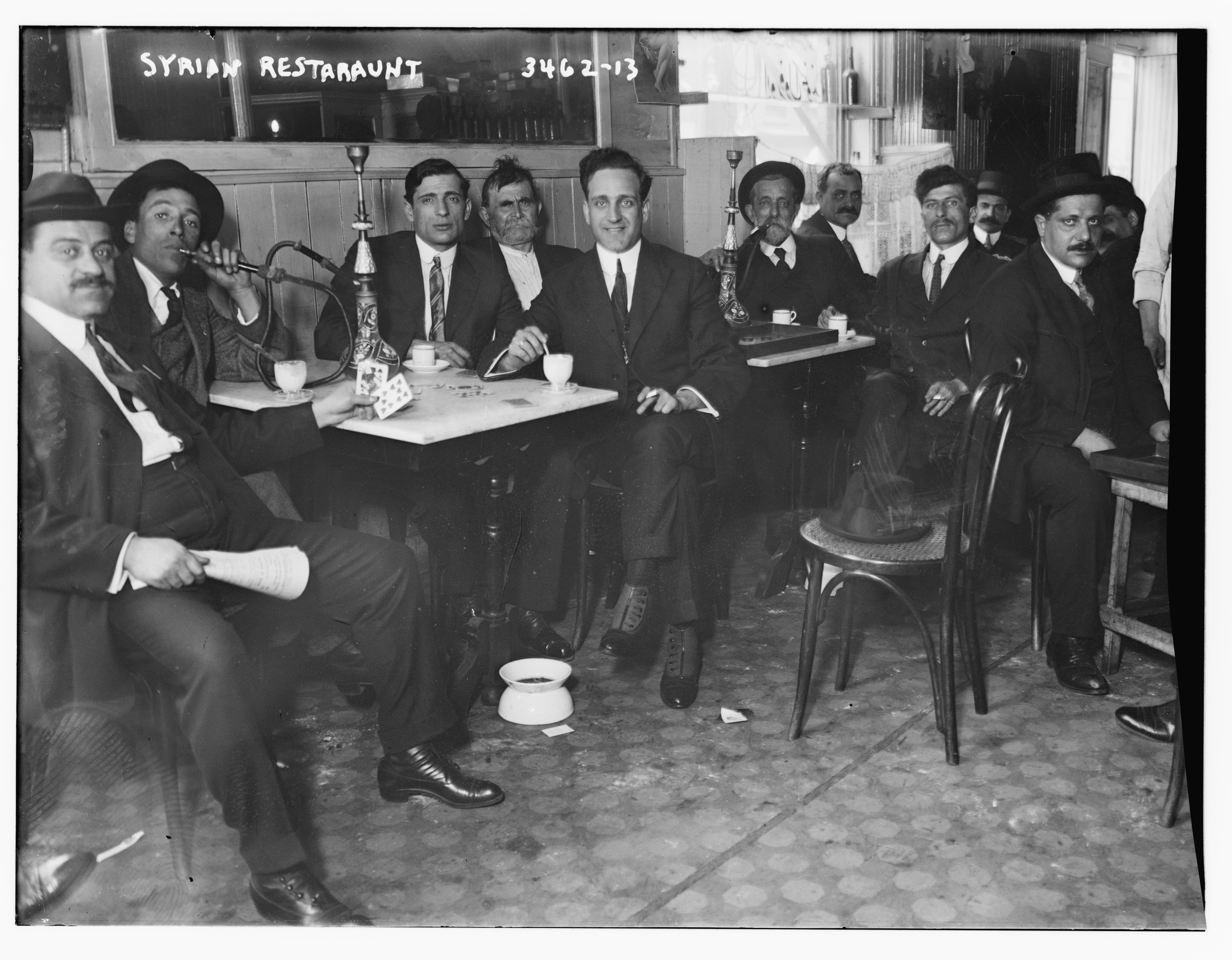
Men smoking shisha and playing cards in a Syrian restaurant, Little Syria (Manhattan), 1910

In 1890, the writer Jacob Riis wrote How the Other Half Lives, a book focused on Syrian children, representing the children as pitiful but dangerous. In 1899, the National Conference on Charities declared children engaged in the street market to be equivalent to begging, opening the possibility that women street merchants with children could be deported.

However, Syrians reacted quickly to assimilate fully into their new culture. Immigrants Anglicized their names, adopted the English language and common Christian denominations. Syrians did not congregate in urban enclaves; many of the immigrants who had worked as peddlers were able to interact with Americans on a daily basis. Aside from negative stigmas, the first generation of Syrian migrants also faced romantic stereotyping for their Christian origins. The migrant and writer Mary Amyuni described being advised to describe her home as "the Holy Land" to ease her integration into the United States: "hold up the rosaries and crosses first; say they are from the Holy Land because Americans are very religious". Writers such as Horatio Alger and Mark Antony De Wolfe Howe contributed to the understanding of Syrian migrants as "redeemable peasants". This view pressured Syrians to reject old ways of life as "un-American" and to "accept new ideals".

Immigrant writers often balanced an adopted culture with a home culture, such as in Ameen Rihani's 1911 "The Book of Khalid", which revolved around an imagined Arabic text inscribed with images of skyscrapers and pyramids. Others argued for the possibility of both identities in public discourse, including Syrian academic Abbas Bajjani, who wrote that "inhabiting two separate worlds—physically and socially—was not only possible but actually desirable, since it was the only hope for the salvation, edification, and modernization of "Syria".

Additionally, military service during World War I and World War II helped accelerate assimilation. Assimilation of early Syrian immigrants was so successful that it has become difficult to recognize the ancestors of many families which have become completely Americanized.

== Religion ==
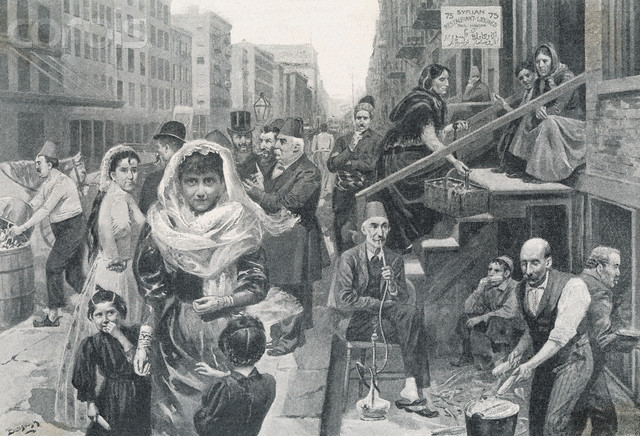
"The Foreign element in New York, the Syrian colony, Washington Street." Drawn by W. Bengough

Christian Syrians arrived in the United States in the late 19th century. Most Christian Syrian Americans are Greek Orthodox, Eastern Catholic, and Syriac Orthodox. There are also many Catholic Syrian Americans; most branches of Catholicism are of the Eastern rite, such as Maronite Catholics, Melkite Greek Catholics, Armenian Catholics, Syrian Catholics, and the Assyrian Chaldean Catholics. A few Christian Syrian Americans are Protestant. There are also members of the Assyrian Church of the East and Ancient Church of the East. The first Syrian American church was founded in Brooklyn, New York in 1895 by Saint Raphael of Brooklyn. There are currently hundreds of Eastern Orthodox churches and missions in the United States.

The first wave of Syrian religious communities in the United States established ninety Maronite, Melkite, and Eastern Orthodox churches across the country by 1920, many establishing firm contrasts between themselves and American Christian faiths such as the Episcopalians or Catholics. Historian Naff writes that as a broad global diaspora threatened the Syrian identity, the preservation of its religious traditions became increasingly important.

Muslim Syrians arrived in the United States chiefly after 1965. The largest sect in Islam is the Sunni sect, forming 74% of the Muslim Syrian population, of whom 12% are ethnic Kurds and 5% Turks. The second largest sect in Islam in Syria is the Alawite sect, a religious sect that originated in Shia Islam but separated from other Shiite Islam groups in the ninth and tenth centuries.

Druze form the third largest sect in Syria, which is a relatively small esoteric monotheistic religious sect. Early Syrian immigrants included Druze peddlers. The United States is the second largest home of Druze communities outside Western Asia after Venezuela (60,000). According to some estimates, there are about 30,000 to 50,000 Druze in the United States, with the largest concentration in Southern California. Most Druze immigrated to the U.S. from Lebanon and Syria.

Syrian Jews first arrived in the United States around 1908 and settled mostly in New York. Initially they lived on the Lower East Side; later settlements were in Bensonhurst and Ocean Parkway in Flatbush, Brooklyn. The Syrian Jewish community estimates its population at around 50,000. Jewish organizations have assisted Syrian refugees by providing various services in Northern New Jersey.

== Politics ==
Early Syrian Americans were not involved politically. Business owners were usually Republican, meanwhile labor workers were usually Democrats. Second generation Syrian Americans were the first to be elected for political roles. In light of the Arab–Israeli conflict, many Syrian Americans tried to affect American foreign policy by joining Arab political groups in the United States. In the early 1970s, the National Association of Arab-Americans was formed to negate the stereotypes commonly associated with Arabs in American media. Syrian Americans were also part of the Arab American Institute, established in 1985, which supports and promotes Arab American candidates, or candidates commiserative with Arabs and Arab Americans, for office. Mitch Daniels, who served as Governor of Indiana from 2005 to 2013, is a descendant of Syrian immigrants with relatives in Homs. As of 2024, many Syrian Americans who are involved with politics were more favorable to supporting Republicans as opposed to supporting Democrats. When Syrian American community leaders attended a conference in Michigan, one of Donald Trump's former foreign-policy advisers, Richard Grenell, said that Syrian Americans were more favorable to vote for Donald Trump in the 2024 United States Presidential Election.

== Employment ==
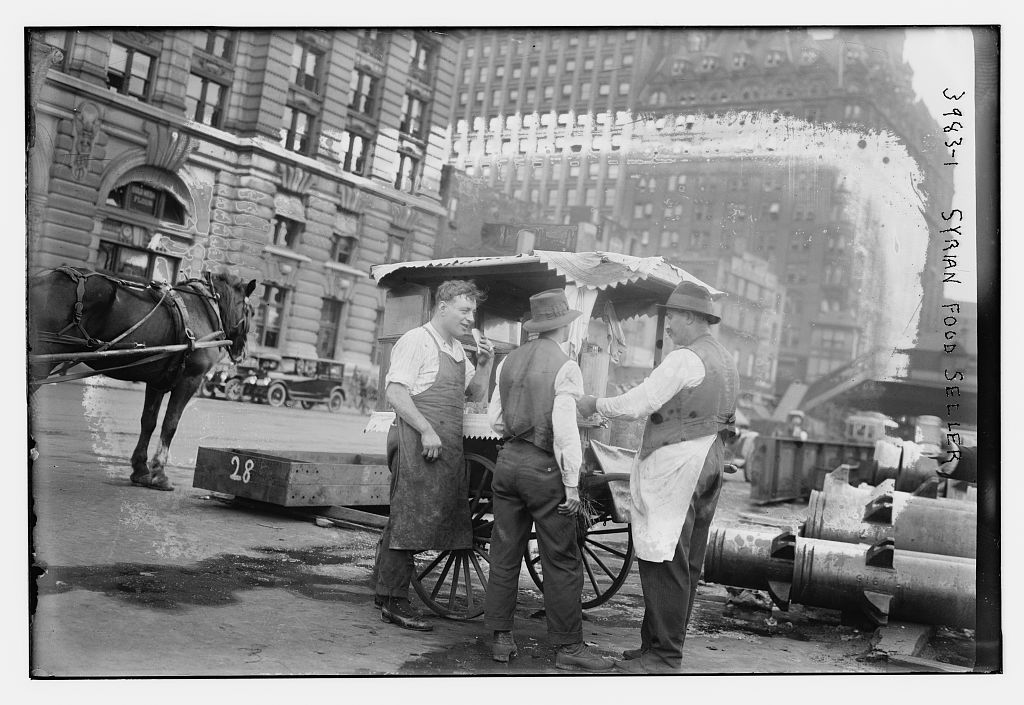
Syrian peddlers in Lower Manhattan, late 1910s

The majority of the early Syrian immigrants arrived in the United States seeking better jobs; they usually engaged in basic commerce, especially peddling. Syrian American peddlers found their jobs comfortable since peddling required little training and mediocre vocabulary. Syrian American peddlers served as the distribution medium for the products of small manufacturers. Syrian peddlers traded mostly in dry goods, primarily clothing. Networks of Syrian traders and peddlers across the United States aided the distribution of Syrian settlements; by 1902, Syrians could be found working in Seattle, Washington. Most of these peddlers were successful, and, with time, and after raising enough capital, some became importers and wholesalers, recruiting newcomers and supplying them with merchandise. By 1908, there were 3,000 Syrian-owned businesses in the United States. By 1910, the first Syrian millionaires had emerged.

Syrian Americans gradually started to work in various métiers; many worked as physicians, lawyers, and engineers. Many Syrian Americans also worked in the bustling auto industry, bringing about large Syrian American gatherings in areas like Dearborn, Michigan. Later Syrian emigrants served in fields like banking, medicine, and computer science. Syrian Americans have a different occupational distribution than all Americans. According to the 2000 census, 42% of the Syrian Americans worked in management and professional occupations, compared with 34% of their counterparts in the total population; additionally, more Syrian Americans worked in sales than all American workers. However, Syrian Americans worked less in the other work domains like farming, transportation, construction, etc. than all American workers. According to the American Medical Association (AMA) and the Syrian American Medical Society (SAMS), which represents American health care providers of Syrian descent, there are estimated 4000 Syrian physicians practicing in the United States representing 0.4% of the health workforce and 1.6% of international medical graduates.

The median household income for Syrian families is higher than the national earning median; employed Syrian men earned an average $46,058 per year, compared with $37,057 for all Americans and $41,687 for Arab Americans. Syrian American families also had a higher median income than all families and lower poverty rates than those of the general population.

== Culture ==
=== Cuisine ===
Further information: Syrian cuisine

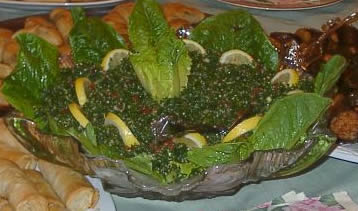
A garnished dish of tabbouleh

Syrians consider eating an important aspect of social life. There are many Syrian dishes which have become popular in the United States. Unlike many Western foods, Syrian foods take more time to cook, are less expensive and usually more healthy. Pita bread (khubz), which is round flat bread, and hummus, a dip made of ground chickpeas, sesame tahini, lemon juice, and garlic, are two popular Syrian foods. Baba ghanoush, or eggplant spreads, is also a dish made by Syrians. Popular Syrian salads include tabbouleh and fattoush. The Syrian cuisine includes other dishes like stuffed zucchini (mahshe), dolma, kebab, kibbeh, kibbeh nayyeh, mujaddara, shawarma, and shanklish. Syrians often serve selections of appetizers, known as meze, before the main course. Za'atar, minced beef, and cheese manakish are popular hors d'œuvre. Syrians are also well known for their cheese. A popular Syrian drink is the arak beverage. One of the popular desserts made by Syrians is the baklava, which is made of filo pastry filled with chopped nuts and soaked in honey. One of the first Syrian-Americans to popularize Levantine cuisine was Helen Corey, who published the bestselling The Art of Syrian Cookery in 1962.

=== Music ===
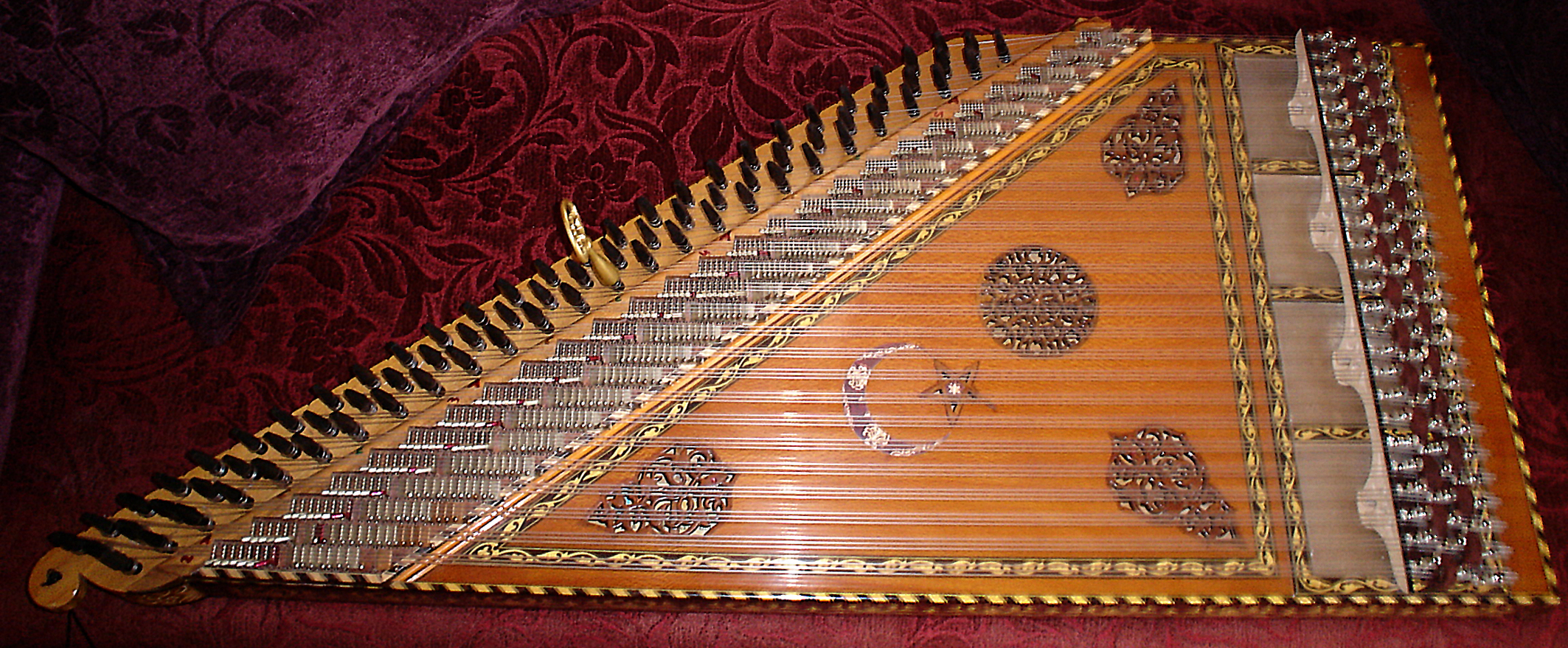
Typical kanun with a 79-tone mandal configuration

Syrian music includes several genres and styles of music ranging from Arab classical to Arabic pop music and from secular to sacred music. Syrian music is characterized by an emphasis on melody and rhythm, as opposed to harmony. There are some genres of Syrian music that are polyphonic, but typically, most Syrian and Arabic music is homophonic. Syrian music is also characterized by the predominance of vocal music. The prototypical Arabic music ensemble in Egypt and Syria is known as the takht, and relies on a number of musical instruments that represent a standardized tone system, and are played with generally standardized performance techniques, thus displaying similar details in construction and design. Such musical instruments include the oud, kanun, rabab, ney, violin, riq, and tableh. The Jews of Syria sang pizmonim.

=== Traditional clothing ===
Traditional dress is not very common with Syrian Americans, and even native Syrians; modern Western clothing is conventional in both Syria and the United States. Ethnic dance performers wear a shirwal, which are loose, baggy pants with an elastic waist. Some Muslim Syrian women wear a hijab, which is a headscarf worn by Muslim women to cover their hair. There are various styles of hijab.

Traditional Syrian clothing for women is typically a long garment with triangle sleeves, referred to as a Thob. These dresses are often embroidered with a variety of motifs and colors. Traditional Syrian clothing for men include the Shirwal which is a type of pants only worn by men. These pants are usually black and baggy. Another type of traditional clothing for Syrian men is the Jalabieh, a gown made of light colors and materials during the warmer weather and conversely dark colors and more coarse material during the colder weather.

=== Holidays ===
Syrian Americans celebrate many religious holidays, with Christian Syrian Americans celebrating most of the Christian holidays that are already celebrated in the United States, but in addition to a few others or at different times. For example, They celebrate Christmas and Easter, but since most Syrians are Eastern Orthodox, they celebrate Easter on a different Sunday from most other Americans, and various Saints' days.

Muslim Syrian Americans celebrate three main Muslim holidays: Ramadan, Eid ul-Fitr (Lesser Bairam), and Eid ul-Adha (Greater Bairam). Ramadan is the ninth month of the Islamic year, during which Muslims fast from dawn to sunset; Muslims resort to self-discipline to cleanse themselves spiritually. After Ramadan is over, Muslims celebrate Eid ul-Fitr, when Muslims break their fasting and revel exuberantly. Muslims also celebrate Eid ul-Adha (which means The Festival of Sacrifice) 70 days after at the end of the Islamic year, a holiday which is held along with the annual pilgrimage to Mecca, Hajj.

=== Dating and marriage ===
Many Syrian Americans prefer traditional relationships over casual dating. For example, Syrian Muslims only date after completing their marriage contract, known as kitabat al-kitab (Arabic: كتابة الكتاب, which means "writing the book" in English), a period that ranges from a few months to a year or more to get used to living with one another. After this, a wedding takes place and cements the marriage. Muslims tend to marry other Muslims only, and same with Christians, but can tend to be dynamic in terms of other ethnic groups; Unable to find other suitable Muslim Syrian Americans, many Muslim Syrian American have married other Muslim Americans.

Syrian American marriages are usually very strong; this is reflected by the low divorce rates among Syrian Americans, which are below the average rates in the United States. Generally, Syrian American partners tend to have more children than average American partners; Syrian American partners also tend to have children at early stages of their marriages. According to the United States 2000 Census, almost 62% of Syrian American households were married-couple households.

== Education ==
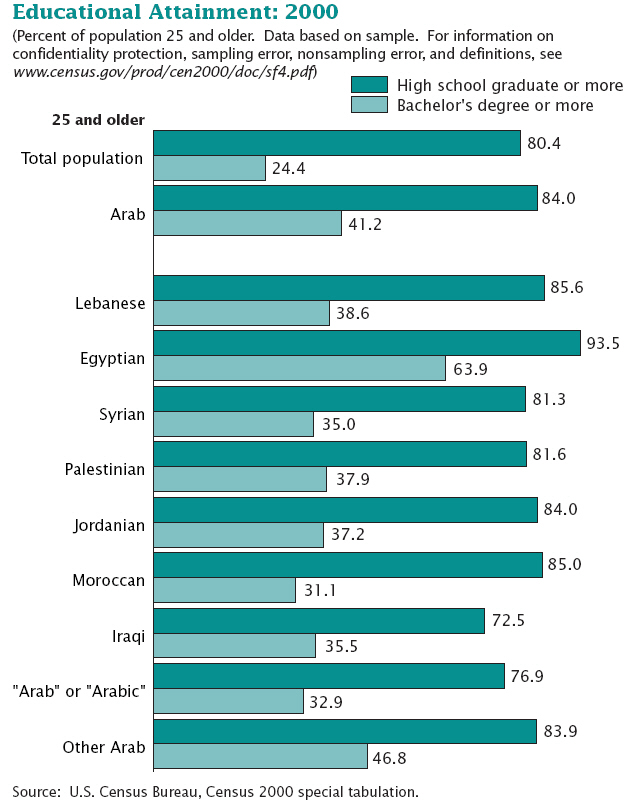
35% of Syrians 25 years and older have a Bachelor's degree or more, compared to 24.4% of all Americans

Syrian Americans, including the earliest immigrants, have always placed a high premium on education. Like many other Americans, Syrian Americans view education as a necessity. Generally, Syrian and other Arab Americans are more highly educated than the average American. In the 2000 census it was reported that the proportion of Syrian Americans to achieve a bachelor's degree or higher is one and a half times that of the total American population.

== Language ==
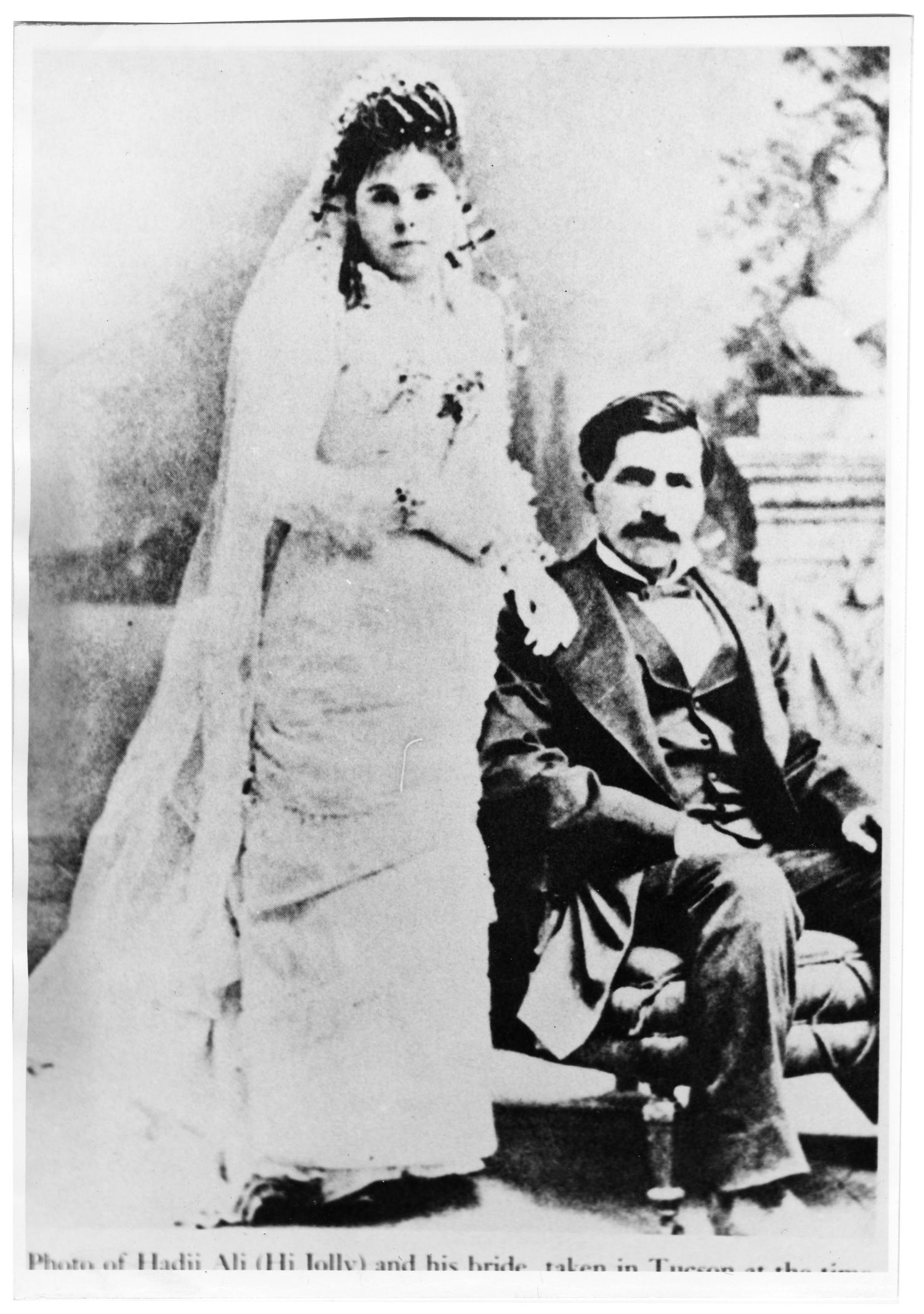
On the right is Ali al-Hajaya better known as Hi Jolly, who in the mid-19th century led an experiment to put camels to use in the U.S. Army.

Many old Syrian American families have lost their linguistic traditions because many parents do not teach their children Arabic. Newer immigrants, however, maintain their language traditions. The 2000 census shows that 79.9% of Syrian Americans speak English "very well". Throughout the United States, there are schools which offer Arabic language classes; there are also some Eastern Orthodox churches which hold Arabic services.

== Notable people ==
- Steve Jobs, co-founder and former CEO of Apple, the largest Disney shareholder, and a member of Disney's Board of Directors. Jobs is considered a leading figure in both the computer and entertainment industries.
- Paula Abdul, television personality, jewelry designer, multi-platinum Grammy-winning singer, and Emmy Award-winning choreographer of Jewish descent According to Abdul, she has sold over 53 million records to date. Abdul found renewed fame as a judge on the highly rated television series American Idol.
- Kareem Al Allaf (born 1998), American tennis player of Syrian descent who has played for Syria and the US
- Victor Atiyeh, former Governor of Oregon
- Jerry Seinfeld, billionaire comedian, actor, and writer, best known for playing a semi-fictional version of himself in the long-running sitcom Seinfeld, which he co-created and executively produced. His mother was of Syrian Jewish descent, his grandparents emigrating from Aleppo.
- Kelly Slater, widely regarded as the greatest professional surfer of all time, he holds 56 Championship Tour victories.
- F. Murray Abraham, actor who won the Academy Award for Best Actor for his role as Antonio Salieri in the 1984 film Amadeus. His career after Amadeus inspired the name of the phenomenon dubbed "F. Murray Abraham syndrome", attributed to Oscar winners who have difficulty obtaining comparable success and recognition despite having recognizable talent.
- Moustapha Akkad, film director and producer originally from Aleppo; Akkad is best known for producing the series of Halloween films, and for directing the Lion of the Desert and Mohammad, Messenger of God films.
- Tige Andrews, Emmy-nominated character actor who was best known for his role as "Captain Adam Greer" on the television series The Mod Squad.
- Teri Hatcher, actress known for her television roles as Susan Mayer on the ABC comedy-drama series Desperate Housewives, and Lois Lane on Lois & Clark: The New Adventures of Superman. Hatcher is Syrian from her mother's side.
- Ignatius Aphrem II, 123rd Patriarch of the Syriac Orthodox Church of Antioch
- Mitch Daniels, former Governor of the U.S. state of Indiana (2005–2013) and former President of Purdue University.
- Najeeb Halaby, former head of Federal Aviation Administration and CEO of Pan-American Airlines, and father of Queen Noor of Jordan.
- Paul Anka, singer-songwriter. Anka rose to fame after many successful 1950s songs, earning him the status of a teen idol.
- Abraham Hamadeh (born May 15, 1991), member of the U.S. House of Representatives from Arizona (Republican).
- Frank Harary, widely recognized as the father of modern graph theory
- Stanley Chera, billionaire real estate developer.
- Jeff Sutton, billionaire real estate developer.
- Joseph Nakash, billionaire businessman, founded along with his brothers Jordache clothing company.
- Joseph Cayre, billionaire businessman.
- Joseph Sitt, real estate developer; founder of Thor Equities and Ashley Stewart
- Victor George "Vic" Atiyeh, 32nd Governor of Oregon from 1979 to 1987, American politician and member of the Republican Party.
- Rosemary Barkett, first woman to serve on the Florida Supreme Court, and the first woman Chief Justice of that court. She subsequently served as a federal judge on the United States Court of Appeals for the Eleventh Circuit, and currently serves as a judge on the Iran–United States Claims Tribunal. The Barkett family originated in the village of Zaidal on the outskirts of Homs.
- Hunein Maassab, professor of epidemiology and the inventor of the live attenuated influenza vaccine.
- Wentworth Miller, actor on Prison Break.
- Rowan Blanchard (born October 14, 2001), actress. Blanchard is Syrian from her paternal grandfather's side.
- Malek Jandali, composer and pianist.
- Justin Amash, former member of the House of Representatives from Michigan from 2011 to 2021 (Republican from 2011 to 2019, Independent from 2019 to 2020, Libertarian from 2020 to 2021 ), mother is Syrian.
- Helen Corey, cookbook author who introduced American audiences to Syrian food beginning with her book, The Art of Syrian Cookery (1962).
- Huda Akil, neuroscientist and medical researcher.
- Shadia Habbal, astronomer and physicist specialized in Space physics.
- Hala Gorani, news anchor and correspondent for CNN International.
- Rahme Haider, toured the US from the 1910s to the 1930s as "Princess Rahme", speaking on Syria.
- Dan Hedaya, prolific character actor notable for his many Italian American film roles.
- Robert M. Isaac, former Republican Mayor of Colorado Springs, Colorado. Elected in 1979, he was the first elected Mayor of the history of Colorado Springs, serving through 1997.
- Alan Jabbour, folklorist and musician.
- Zuhdi Jasser (born 1967), physician, Muslim reformer, and founder of the American Islamic Forum for Democracy.
- Alan Jouban, UFC fighter.
- Mohja Kahf (born 1967), poet and author.
- Dina Katabi (born 1971), Professor of Electrical Engineering and Computer Science at MIT and the director of the MIT Wireless Center.
- Kurtis Mantronik, hip-hop, electro funk, and dance music artist, DJ, remixer, and producer. Mantronik was the leader of the old-school band Mantronix.
- Jack Marshall, author and poet.
- Charles T. Meide, underwater archaeologist and the Director of LAMP at the St. Augustine Lighthouse & Maritime Museum. His ancestors (Meide, originally Maida, and Barket, alternatively spelled Barkett) emigrated from the villages of Fairouzeh and Zaidal near Homs around the turn of the 20th century.
- Dean Muhtadi (born July 17, 1986), professional wrestler signed with the WWE under the name "Mojo Rawley".
- Mary Rose Oakar (1940–2025), former member of the U.S. House of Representative from Ohio (Democratic).
- Brandon Saad (born October 27, 1992), professional ice hockey player for the Chicago Blackhawks. Saad was a finalist in the 2012–13 season for the Calder Memorial Trophy, along with winning the Stanley Cup in 2013, and 2015 with the Blackhawks.
- Louay M. Safi (born September 15, 1955), scholar and Human Rights activist, and a vocal critic of the Far Right. Author of numerous books and articles, Safi is active in the debate on nuclear race, social and political development, and Islam-West issues. He is the chairman of the Syrian American Congress.
- Mary Sallom (1884–1955), physician in Philadelphia.
- Andre Sayegh, mayor of Mayor of Paterson, New Jersey
- Yasser Seirawan, chess grandmaster and 4-time US-champion. Seirawan is the 69th best chess player in the world and the 2nd in the United States.
- Mona Simpson, novelist and essayist; Simpson is also the biological sister of Steve Jobs.
- Wafa Sultan (born 1958), secular activist and vocal critic of Islam. In 2006, Sultan was chosen by Time magazine to be on the Time 100 list of the 100 most influential people in 2006.
- Vic Tayback, actor who won two Golden Globe Awards for his role in the television series Alice.
- Lisa Brennan-Jobs, writer.
- Fawwaz Ulaby, R. Jamieson and Betty Williams Professor of Electrical Engineering and Computer Science at the University of Michigan, and the former vice president for research.
- Diana al-Hadid (born 1981), contemporary Syrian sculptor from Aleppo based in the Brooklyn, New York.
- Sam Yagan, American entrepreneur and business executive, co-founder of SparkNotes, eDonkey, OkCupid, and Techstars Chicago, also CEO of Match Group, including Tinder.
- Souhel Najjar, neurologist and psychologist whose story with Susannah Cahalan turned into an American Drama Film. He studied medicine in the University of Damascus and in Albany Medical College.
- Eddie Antar, founder of Crazy Eddie, of Syrian Jewish descent.
- Amal Kassir, international award-winning spoken word poet.
- Riad Barmada, orthopaedic surgeon.
- Rama Duwaji, animator, illustrator and ceramist; wife of elected New York City mayor Zohran Mamdani
- Robert P. George, philosopher and academic.

== See also ==
- Syrian American Council
- Syrian Jewish communities of the United States
- Syria–United States relations
- Syrian Americans in New York City
- Syrian Jews
