= Umm Waraqa =

Islamic figure

Umm Waraqah bint 'Abdullah b. Al-Harith Ansariah (commonly known as Umm Waraqah; Arabic: أم ورقة بنت عبد الله بن الحارث) was one of the female companions of the Islamic prophet Muhammad. She was appointed by Islamic prophet Muhammad to lead prayers at her household.

== Life ==
Umm Waraqah was one of very few people to have memorized the entire Qur'an, she was one of its few oral transmitters before it was recorded in writing. She was killed by "two servants, a male and a female who were under her charge."

== Interpretations ==
The example of Umm Waraqah is based on a Hadith which has been graded Hasan (Acceptable) by Al Albani. The hadith also refutes the argument made by Imam Nawawi as it states that the Muezzin was an old man who prayed behind her so she did lead men in prayer.

The example of Umm Waraqah serves as the basis for the opinion among some Islamic jurists that women are permitted to not only lead other women in prayer, but that they may also lead mixed-sex congregations under the circumstance that she leads from behind the male congregation, does not beautify her voice, that there is no man available with any knowledge of the Quran, and that she leads them in a nafl prayer and not a fardh prayer. This is a minority opinion in the Hanbali tradition. The Hanbali tradition does not take the hadith of Umm Waraqah as daleel (proof used while drawing a conclusion from Islamic law), because Umm Waraqah did not have any men in her household to lead in prayer.
