= Progressive Muslim Union =

Former liberal Islamic organization

The Progressive Muslim Union of North America (PMU) was a liberal Islamic organization. The group officially launched on November 15, 2004, in Manhattan but was disbanded in December 2006.

The Progressive Muslim Union (PMU) is the result of almost two years of conversation and collaboration between a group of North American Muslims who are committed to representing and renewing our community in all its social, ideological and political diversity. PMU members range from deeply religious to totally secular, sharing in common a commitment to learning, political and social empowerment, a commitment to justice and freedom and a concern and love for the Muslim community.

== Woman imam ==
These differences came to a head in March 2005, when PMU endorsed a mixed-gender prayer led by a woman imam, Professor Amina Wadud. The prayer was co-sponsored by the progressive Muslim online magazine Muslim WakeUp! and Asra Nomani's Muslim Women's Freedom Tour. The event, which was attended by about 150 congregants in New York City and heavily covered by international media, became a huge controversy, galvanizing both supporters and detractors around the world.

Opponents, in particular M. A. Muqtedar Khan, argued that reform should be restricted to social matters, not matters of worship. Supporters, however, asserted that nothing in the Qur'an, the Muslim holy scripture, prevents a woman from leading mixed-gender prayers, and that restrictions are based on outmoded cultural and patriarchal notions.

PMU's co-chair, Pamela Taylor, reinforced PMU's position when she joined hands with the Muslim Canadian Congress and the United Muslim Association to be the first woman to deliver the Friday sermon and lead the mixed-gender congregation in a mosque on July 1, 2005.

== Current state ==
PMU is now defunct, due to a schism. In July 2005, board member Muqtedar Khan resigned. In August 2005, three of the four founding members, Omid Safi, Hussein Ibish and Sarah Eltantawi resigned along with Laury Silvers and Michael Muhammad Knight (Ahmed Nassef was the fourth founding member). When Michael Muhammad Knight resigned, he predicted that PMU would collapse within one year.

In December 2006, chair Pamela Taylor and executive director Ani Zonneveld resigned from the board, citing unreconcilable conflicts with board member Tarek Fatah. Soon after, Fatah, who controlled PMU's e-mail discussion list, blocked posting by list members.

Two of the original eighteen leaders of PMU, Ani Zonneveld and Pamela Taylor, created a new organization, Muslims for Progressive Values (MPV) in May 2007.

== See also ==
- Muslims for Progressive Values
- Muslim Canadian Congress
- Canadian Muslim Union
- Muslim Alliance for Sexual and Gender Diversity
- Progressive British Muslims
