= Helen Corey =

American cookbook author (1923–2024)

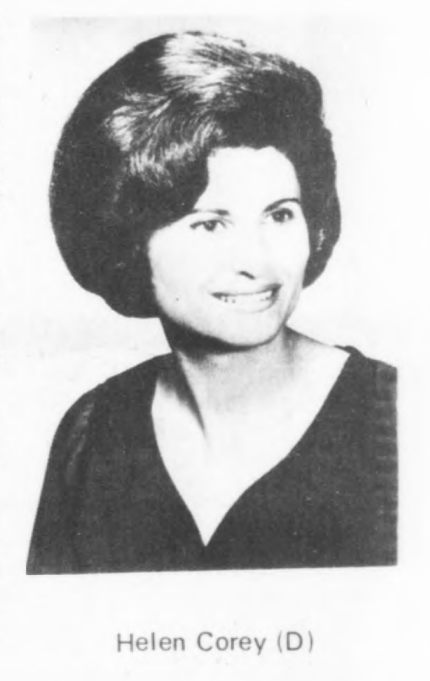
- Born: October 9, 1923; Canton, Ohio, U.S.
- Died: January 28, 2024 (aged 100); Terre Haute, Indiana, U.S.

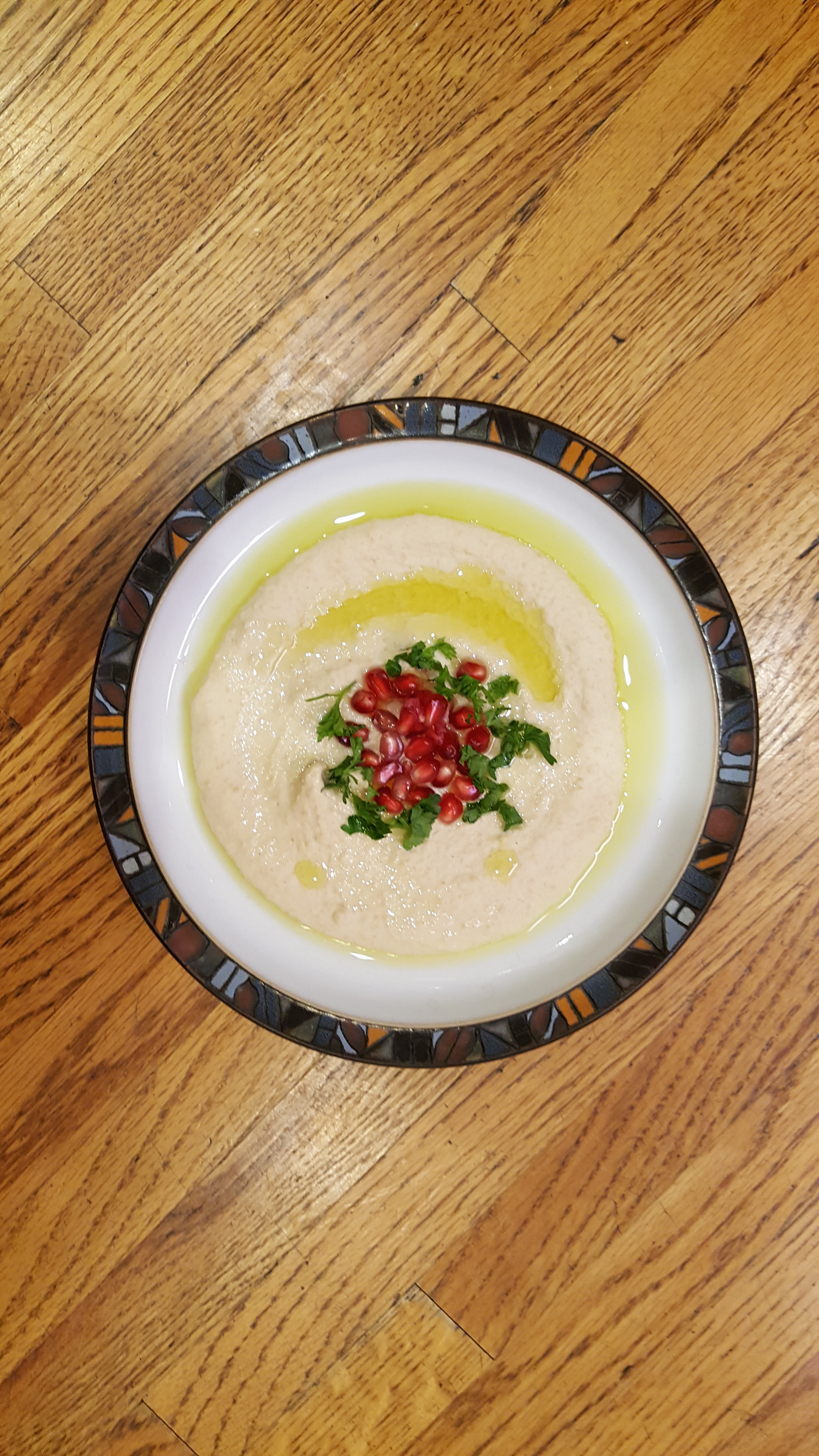
"Chick Pea Sesame Dip" (Homos bi Tahini) made according to the recipe in Helen Corey's Food from Biblical Lands cookbook (1989), p. 4. Pomegranate seeds and parsley garnish the hummus. The author cites Exodus 38:33-34, which begins, "On its hem you shall make pomegranates of blue and purple and scarlet yarns..." (English Standard Version)

Helen E. Corey (October 9, 1923 – January 28, 2024) was an American cookbook author, television producer, and educator. She is also the first American woman of Syrian descent to have held elected office in Indiana. She is known for her cookbooks The Art of Syrian Cookery (1962) and Helen Corey's Food from Biblical Lands (1989), in which she stressed the biblical origins of Middle Eastern cuisine and the value of sharing food as a vehicle for cross-cultural and inter-faith dialogue. In her cookbooks she also promoted awareness of Eastern Christianity in the United States, by discussing her family's culture in the Antiochian Orthodox Church.

== Family and early life ==
Helen Corey's parents, Maheeba (“Mabel”) and Mkhyal (“Michael”), were born in the Arne and Ein el-shara suburbs of Damascus, Syria, and migrated to the United States. Helen Corey was born on October 9, 1923, in Canton, Ohio, and lived there until she moved to Terre Haute, Indiana in 1946. She and her family were part of a wave of Arabic immigrants who migrated to Terre Haute during the early twentieth century and who settled there due to the city's “potential for prosperity through farming, mining and a growing manufacturing base.” As early as 1927, the town had a sufficiently substantial Syrian Christian community that its members wrote and notarized a constitution for its church, St. George Orthodox Church. In 2018, Corey participated in a ceremony commemorating a historical marker for “Little Syria on the Wabash”, the site of the original twentieth-century immigrant Syrian neighborhoods of Terre Haute.

As a member of St. George Orthodox Church (the Syrian Antiochian Orthodox church of Terre Haute) Helen Corey often acted as a de facto ambassador for her church. She also served on this church's board of trustees.

Through her cookbooks, television show, and other public programs, she aimed to raise public awareness about Syrian culture and to share information on the Antiochian Orthodox Church's feast and fast days. With five godchildren, Corey describes herself as belonging to a close-knit family community.

Helen Corey died in Terre Haute on January 28, 2024, at the age of 100.

== Career and civic engagement ==
Helen Corey published The Art of Syrian Cookery in 1962. Years later, she founded a press, called CharLyn Publishing, which then published her second major cookbook, Helen Corey’s Food From Biblical Lands in 1989, followed by Healthy Syrian and Lebanese Cooking in 2004. Corey produced a televised show inspired by Food From Biblical Lands in 1990 and a later documentary about Easter as observed in the Syrian Antiochian Orthodox Church Easter. She occasionally hosted television shows and often interviewed international guests. Her 2004 book Healthy Syrian and Lebanese Cooking received first place in the National Federation of Press Women, out of 1,700 books submitted.

Helen Corey’s Food From Biblical Lands was out of print until October 2016, when Echo Print Books and Media issued an updated version of the cookbook for the Middle Eastern Festival sponsored in Terre Haute, Indiana by St. George Social Center. Proceeds from the book sale benefited the associated St. George Orthodox Church.

Corey worked for many years in municipal and state government. From 1948 to 1961 she was secretary to the Terre Haute Mayor Ralph Tucker and Indiana's Young Democrat National Committeewoman. In 1963, Corey served as executive secretary of the Indiana Commission on the Status of Women. In November 1964, she was elected Reporter for the Supreme and Appellate Courts – and thereby the first Syrian American elected to public office in Indiana.

Through her cookbooks, television show, and other public programs, she aimed to raise public awareness about Syrian culture and to share information on the Antiochian Orthodox Church's feast and fast days.

== Cooking ==
=== Religion ===
In her cookbooks, Corey prominently features dishes associated with Lent, when Christians in the Antiochan Orthodox Church and in many other Middle Eastern churches abstain from meat, poultry, dairy, and eggs during the forty days before Easter and in preparation for the Passion of Christ. Lenten dishes are either vegan or based on fish. Orthodox Christians follow the same guidelines on Wednesdays and Fridays, as well as smaller fasts throughout the year.

Before Lent, Christians in different countries have had different traditions regarding pre-Lent meals. Corey's cookbooks include many recipes centered around pre-Lent dishes in Syria, especially kibby (beef or lamb-stuffed wheat), the national dish of Syria and Lebanon. Syrian Orthodox Christians, she reported, also partake in a “cheese-fare” the week before Lent in which they sampled many cheeses before the fast begins. The pre-fast rituals ended with the consumption of a boiled egg. Lent also ended with the breaking of an egg, common in many Christian traditions.

Corey's cookbooks also include many Lenten recipes, including hummus bi-tahini (chickpeas pureed with sesame paste). Many of Corey's Lenten foods consist of ingredients commonly used in many Syrian dishes, such as lentils, fava beans, and eggplant.

=== Culinary diplomacy ===
Corey's cookbooks have been described as participating in culinary diplomacy, the practice of promoting cultural links between people in different countries or communities through sharing foods and drinks - respective culinary repertoires – whether through published recipes, via film, or in restaurants or home kitchens, in ways that facilitate dialogue and mutual understanding. Historian Jennifer Dueck has noted that cookbooks like Corey's were appreciated by the American mainstream as evidenced by their multiple editions and major publishers.

== Bibliography ==
- The Art of Syrian Cookery (1962, Doubleday)
- Healthy Syrian and Lebanese Cooking: A Culinary Trip To The Land Of Bible History-Syria and Lebanon (2004, CharLyn Publishing House)
- Helen Corey’s Food From Biblical Lands: A Culinary Trip to the Land of Bible History (2016, Echo Point Books & Media)
- From the Kitchen of Helen Corey: The Art of Healthy- Syrian Lebanese Cooking (VHS titled: The Art of Syrian and Lebanese Cooking), 1999.
