= Berlin Institute for Advanced Study =

Interdisciplinary institute

- Wissenschaftskolleg zu Berlin
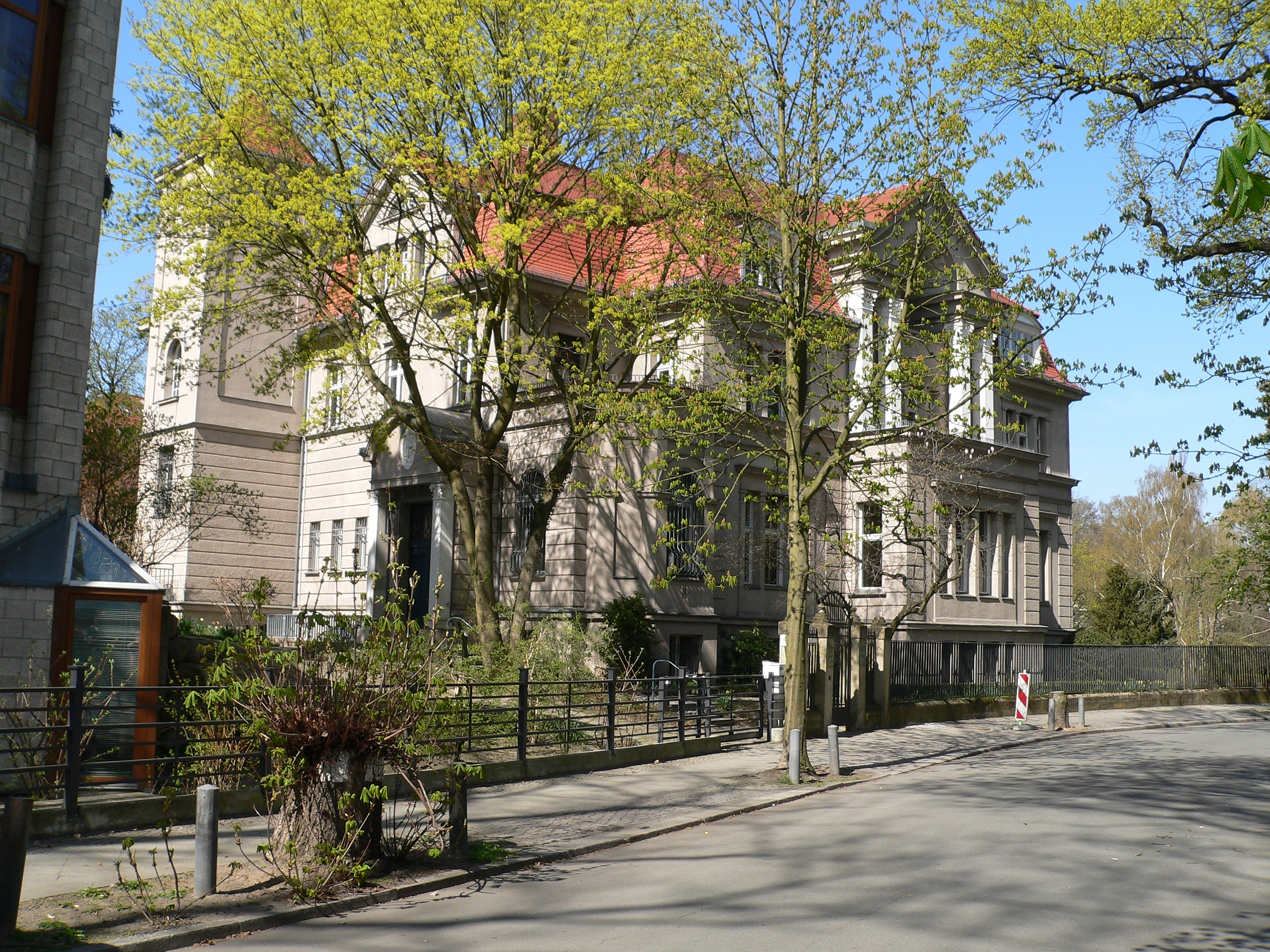
- Wissenschaftskolleg on Wallotstraße in Berlin-Grunewald
- Established: 1981
- Affiliations: Some Institutes for Advanced Study
- Location: Berlin, Germany; 52°29′29″N 13°16′35″E
- Website: www.wiko-berlin.de/en/

The Institute for Advanced Study in Berlin (German: Wissenschaftskolleg zu Berlin) is an interdisciplinary institute founded in 1981 in Grunewald, Berlin, Germany, dedicated to research projects in the natural and social sciences. It is modeled after the original IAS in Princeton, New Jersey and is a member of Some Institutes for Advanced Study.

The purpose of the institute is to offer scholars and scientists the opportunity to concentrate on projects of their own choosing for one academic year, free from administrative duties. The institute embraces a balance of both distinguished senior scholars and promising younger researchers, drawn from a wide range of cultural backgrounds. The institute has been headed by historian Barbara Stollberg-Rilinger as rector since September 2018.

== Principles of the institute ==
Fellows at the Wissenschaftskolleg are chosen with no restrictions on country of origin, discipline, or academic position. With the help of an international advisory board, invitations to scholars and scientists, are designed to promote exchange across disciplinary boundaries and among researchers from different cultures.

At the heart of the Wissenschaftskolleg is the idea that researchers must be free to choose their own distinctive research projects. The fellows' only obligations are to reside at the Wissenschaftskolleg, and to meet once a day for a meal and each Tuesday for the weekly colloquium. At each Tuesday colloquium, one Fellow presents his or her work to the other Fellows followed by an hour of rigorous discussion.

== Alumni/alumnae ==
Among the alumni/alumnae of the Institute for Advanced Study Berlin are Carolyn Abbate, Svetlana Alpers, Philippe Ariès, Peter Burke, Elísio Macamo, Lorraine Daston, Jon Elster, Ute Frevert, Clifford Geertz, Carlo Ginzburg, Anthony Grafton, Hans Werner Henze, Albert O. Hirschman, Antjie Krog, Stanislaw Lem, Hilary Putnam, Elaine Scarry, Quentin Skinner, Sa'diyya Shaikh, and Niko Kolodny.
