= Nathan Badeen =

Syrian American soldier in the American Revolutionary War

Muster roll of the 18th Continental Regiment, featuring Badeen's name near the middle of the page

Nathan Badeen (Arabic: ناثان بدين; died May 23, 1776) was a Syrian American soldier who fought in the American Revolutionary War. He was among the first Arab Americans to serve in the Continental Army and is considered to be the first Arab American soldier to die for the United States.

== Biography ==
Badeen came from a family of farmers and merchants from Hauran (present-day Syria). It is believed he may have been abducted by French traders in the city of Latakia and was sent to Canada via French ships. He was abandoned in Canada and settled near Massachusetts prior to the start of the American Revolutionary War. Usman Butt of The New Arab alleged that Badeen may have been the first Syrian to be documented in the United States in a 2023 piece.

Badeen enlisted as a private into the Continental Army on January 1, 1776, and served in Colonel Edmund Phinney's 18th Continental Regiment. On May 23, 1776, at Fort George, Badeen died.

== Legacy ==
Few biographical details are known about Badeen, which may be attributed to the fact that many Arab Americans concealed their names and identity during this time. Badeen is believed to be the first Arab American to die in service to the United States.

In April 2022, U.S. Secretary of State Antony Blinken recognized Badeen as "a Syrian immigrant who fought and gave his life during the American Revolution" in recognition of National Arab American Heritage Month. U.S. Chair of the Equal Employment Opportunity Commission Charlotte Burrows released a similar statement in 2024.
