= Ani Zonneveld =

Malaysian-American musician, activist, and writer (born 1962)

- Born: Zuriani binti Abdul Khalid; October 26, 1962 (age 63); Kuala Lumpur, Malaysia
- Occupations: Musician; vocalist; songwriter; record producer; writer; non-profit president
- Years active: 1990–present
- Website: anizonneveld.com

Ani Zonneveld (born 1962) is a Malaysian-American singer, songwriter, activist, and writer based in Los Angeles. She has released three original albums, produced music for other artists, and participated in the writing of Grammy-winning songs. She is the first Malaysian person to have won a Grammy.

She is the president and founder of Muslims for Progressive Values (MPV), a nonprofit organization in the United States with affiliates in Canada, Europe, Chile, Australia, and Malaysia creating inclusive communities that welcome and support interfaith marriages, gay marriages, gender & sexual minorities, as well as sectarian minorities.

Zonneveld is also the editor, along with Vanessa Karam and Olivia Samad, of Progressive Muslim Identities: Personal Stories from the U.S. and Canada, a 2011 anthology that features a diverse groups of progressive Muslims, with a foreword by Aasif Mandvi, published in the United States by Oracle Releasing.

== Early life ==
Ani Zonneveld was born in Kuala Lumpur, Malaysia, along with five other siblings, and was raised in Germany, Egypt, and India as the daughter of a Malaysian ambassador and a stay-at-home mother. In 1981, she moved to the United States, where she studied economics and political science. After college, she moved to Los Angeles to pursue a career as a musician instead of following in her father's footsteps.

== Music and activism ==
As a musician, songwriter, and producer, Zonneveld has had a bustling career that has included producing several pop songs for singer Ziana Zain, as well as composing pop tracks for Fauziah Latiff, Aishah, and vocal boy band Kool in Malaysia. She has collaborated with singer Siti Nurhaliza, for which she won several awards at the Anugerah Industri Muzik, including Album of the Year twice with Siti's Adiwarna (1998) and E.M.A.S (2003). She is also a three-time finalist of Anugerah Juara Lagu, a local song competition, through her collaboration with Kool (in 1997 for "Cemburu" and 1998 for "Satu Arah) and Siti (2003, "Ku Milikmu").

In Hollywood, Zonneveld's collaborations with Keb Mo' earned her a Grammy award, becoming the first Malaysian ever to be nominated and to win this accolade. After the September 11 attacks in the United States, her religion became a strong part of her identity, leading to writing and producing spiritual-themed music, including an album titled Ummah Wake-Up, in which she sings the praise of Islam while encouraging Muslims to rise up for progressive causes. She also began performing at various interfaith organizational events in an effort to raise awareness of Islam as a religion of peace.

A few years later, Zonneveld joined other concerned Muslims of a progressive background as a board member of the Progressive Muslim Union of North America (PMU), launched on November 15, 2004, in New York City. Before disbanding in 2006, the group met with controversy when in 2005 they supported a public woman-led prayer in New York City, raising a global uproar.

In July 2007 at Sarah Lawrence College, New York, Zonneveld spearheaded the founding of Muslims for Progressive Values (MPV). Since its founding, Zonneveld has presided over the expansion of MPV into several chapters across the United States, Canada, Chile, France, Germany, Australia, and Malaysia, and helped it secure a consultative status at the United Nations. The organization's successes include "Literary Zikr", a project that turns scholarly works into everyday language aimed at youth and the general public; and "Progressive Muslim Identities", an anthology highlighting personal struggles of progressive Muslims in the United States and Canada, including women of interfaith marriages, LGBT Muslims, and other minorities.

== Discography ==
- Ummah Wake Up (2003)
- One (2005)
- Islamic Hymns: Celebration of Life (2012)
