= Louay M. Safi =

Syrian-American Muslim scholar

Louay M. Safi (Arabic: لؤي صافي) is a Syrian-American, a scholar of Islam and the Middle East, and an advocate of Arab and Muslim American rights. He published on such issues as social and political development, modernization, democracy, human rights, and Islam and Modernity. He is the author of 11 books and numerous papers, and speaker on questions of leadership, democracy, Islam, and the Middle East. He is also a spokesperson for the Syrian National Coalition, a league of Syrian opposition groups fighting Syrian President Assad, which was formed in November 2012 in Doha, Qatar.

Louay Safi is also chairman of the Syrian American Council and testified in front of the Tom Lantos Human Rights Commission on Syria. He is currently a professor at The Qatar Faculty for Islamic Studies in Doha.

== Biography ==
Safi was born in Damascus where he received his early education. He moved to the United States in the early eighties where he received his B.Sc. in civil engineering, and later a M.A. and a Ph.D. in Political Science from Wayne State University in Detroit, Michigan. He has written books on social and political development, modernization, democracy, human rights, and Islam and the Middle East.

Safi has served as executive director and Director of Research for the Muslim Brotherhood-funded think tank International Institute of Islamic Thought (IIIT), editor of the Journal of Islamic Social Sciences, and President of the Association of Muslim Social Scientists (1999–2003). He has also taught at Wayne State University in Detroit, Michigan, the International Islamic University in Malaysia and George Washington University in Washington, DC.

Safi served as executive director of the Islamic Society of North America (ISNA), an unindicted co-conspirator to terror finance in the Holy Land Foundation Trial, Leadership Development Center (ILDC) (2004–2008), later he served as Director of Communications and Leadership for year 2009. He serves on the board of Muslim organizations, including the Center for the Study of Islam and Democracy (CSID), and the Association of Muslim Social Scientists (AMSS). He is a fellow with the Institute of Social Policy and Understanding (ISPU) and serves on the steering committee of the Muslim-Christian Initiative on the Nuclear Weapons Danger (MCI).

He has appeared on radio and TV programs, including BBC, C-SPAN, CNN, Monte Carlo, Fox News, PBS, Wish TV, Middle East TV (MBC), Al-Jazeera TV, Voice of America, Malaysian television, and others.

== Views and positions ==
Safi advocates reform of Islamic thought, culture, and law by appealing to the universal Islamic values. He supports democratic reform in Muslim countries, rejects interpretations of Islamic sources that instigate inter-religious hostility, calls for the development of more inclusive societies in the Muslim world, and has frequently defended the fledgling Muslim American community against attacks from the far right.

=== Democracy ===
Safi believes that Democracy as a system of self governance, accountability of holders of public office, and the rule of law is fully compatible with Islam. He has argued that Islam is essential for the transformation of Muslim societies from autocratic rule to democracy. A cultural change is required for any democratic reform, and such a change, he insists, is impossible without appealing to more fundamental values. That's where Islam comes in. As it is difficult to imagine the modern West without the Religious Reformation in Europe, it is also difficult to expect democratic reform in the Middle East without Islam being a big part of that. "Turkey can probably give us some clues as how a positive Islamic reform can bring about true democracy without resorting to violence," he argues.

Safi further argues that micro-managing the reform process is counterproductive, and is likely to play into the hands of anti-democratic forces intent on stemming out the fledgling democratic forces under the rubric of safeguarding national independence and countering foreign interference. He, therefore, proposes that rather than pressuring autocratic government to change school curricula and superimpose a set of abstract criteria through state apparatus, US government should use its influence to increase the margin of freedom for political expression and action by civil society organizations. The forces of reform and modernization are already at work in Muslim societies, and have, despite severe limitations imposed by the state on their actions, made considerable strides to effect educational, cultural, and political reforms.

=== War and peace ===
Safi insists that war is not an instrument for advancing Islam, but for repelling aggression and, in limited cases for rescuing a brutally oppressed minority. He criticized the classical doctrine of jihad as being seriously flawed since it violates some of the essential Islamic principles on the Islamic ethics of war. Safi has recently written objecting to the classical doctrine; "Evidently, the classical doctrine of war and peace has not been predicated on a comprehensive theory. The doctrine describes the factual conditions that historically prevailed between the Islamic state, during the 'Abbasid and Byzantine era, and thus, renders rules which respond to specific historical needs."

The flaw is evident, he insists, when one considers the relationship between the early Muslim community and the Christian Abyssinia. He recalls that the Islamic prophet Muhammad himself had sent the earliest group of his followers from Mecca to seek refuge from persecution in Abyssinia. They lived there in peace, and some of them did not return, even after Muslims were in power in Mecca. Moreover, the peaceful coexistence continued for over a millennium up until modern times.

He, nonetheless, rejects the effort to repudiate the right of people to use force to repel aggression. Jihad is a struggle for just peace using peaceful means. He, though, insists that Jihad as an armed struggle can be legitimately employed to repel aggression and lift oppression, but only as the last resort.

=== Apostasy controversy ===
Safi has not shied away from controversial issues, and has taken clear positions on hot questions, including the question of apostasy. He rejects efforts to implement traditional Sharia in modern times without considering the impact of historical social conditions on the promulgation of law in historical Muslim society. He, for instance, opposed the application of apostasy rules in modern Muslim society, and argued that a proper reading of Islamic sources would affirm religious freedom. Individuals, he insisted, should be able to accept or reject a particular faith on the basis of personal conviction, and that no amount of external pressure or compulsion should be permitted.

=== Muslim women's rights ===
Safi advocates women's right to assume public role and calls on the mosque authorities to reflect the leading role Muslim American women play by ensuring that they are represented on the mosque boards and join the rank of leadership. The importance of women taking active part on the executive boards and in executive committees is further underscored, he argues, by the need to represent concerns that can not be expressed except by women, who feel the impact of decisions made by the mosque on the quality of life and participation of other women.

=== War on terror ===
Safi believes that force can be used legitimately and effectively against terrorism, but he disagreed with the "war on terror" strategy advanced by the Bush administration He attributes the rise of terrorism to the authoritarian regimes that stifle debate in the Middle East, and that consistently use iron fist policies to silence opposition. Such policies, he contends, have had the effect of silencing moderate voices, and the only voices that are heard today are the voices of those who can make noise through violent actions.

Speaking in Dublin, Ireland before the College Historical Society, Safi stressed the need to have clarity in defining terrorism and consistency in prosecuting the war on terrorism. He pointed out that the current definition of terrorism adopted is oblivious to violence committed by oppressive governments against civilian populations under their control. He stressed the need to adopt universal criteria rooted in international humanitarian law, and then consistently apply the criteria to both state and non-state actors. This is not only the right thing to do, he argued, but the most effective way to counter terrorism. He suggested that terrorism should be defined as "the use of violence against civilians and non-combatants for achieving political ends."

Focusing on the Global War on Terrorism, he illustrated how the lack of clarity and the absence of consistency have led to increase, rather than decrease, in the incidents of terrorism. Referring to recent statistics released by the Memorial Institute for the Prevention of Terrorism (MIPT), a federally funded organization, he pointed out that the number of terrorist incidents increased worldwide from 2,013 in 2002 to 3,646 in 2004, to a staggering figure of almost 6,500 in 2006.

Safi argues that overreliance on military power has been counterproductive in fighting terrorism, as it has deepened the divide between the United States and Muslim countries on the one hand, and reduced the ability of Muslim Americans to "promote dialog between the Muslim world and the West."

Safi blames the Far Right for promoting and harboring Islamophobia with the hope to turn the war on terrorism into a war on Islam and Muslims. The Far Right, he insists, wants to see deep rift between Islam and the West, and has turned Muslim Americans into targets and suspects, thereby reducing their ability to play the bridge-building role.

== Criticism and praise ==
Safi has been criticized for his involvement with Muslim organizations, and for his views on US foreign policy towards the Middle East. He accused his critics of exploiting the climate of fear in the wake of 9/11 terrorist attacks to marginalize Muslim American organizations and activists.

Safi has been outspoken about what he has described as a "concerted attack on the Muslim American organizations by the members of the far right." He decried the 2002 raids on mainstream Muslim organizations in Northern Virginia, which included the Fiqh Council of North America (FCNA), the highest Muslim religious authority in North America, the Graduate School of Islamic and Social Sciences (GSSIS), a Muslim institution for training Muslim chaplains, and the International Institute of Islamic Thought (IIIT), a research organization focusing on reform of Islamic thought. Safi accused the Custom Service agent who led the raids of relying heavily on information provided by the Steven Emerson's Investigative Project and his former assistant Rita Katz's SITE Institute.

In July 2005, Michael Fichter, reporting for the Tampa Tribune, made a vague reference to a conversation Safi had in 1995 with Sami Al-Arian. Fichter contended that Safi asked Al-Arian whether an Executive Order issued in early 1995 by President Bill Clinton would affect the latter. According to Fichter, Al-Arian responded mockingly by calling the order "a war waged by the Zionists." Fichter alleged that Safi agreed with Al-Arian's assessment that Zionist lobbying activities were behind the Executive Order.

Al-Arian, a former computer engineering professor at the University of South Florida, "was acquitted on eight counts of aiding the Palestinian Islamic Jihad," s the jury deadlocked on nine other counts. He pleaded guilty in 2006 to one count of providing services to members of the terrorist group the Palestinian Islamic Jihad. He was sentenced to prison, and will be deported after completing his four-years-and-nine-months sentence.

In May 2007, Fichter left the Tribune to join Emerson's organization. The Tribune's article that reported Fichter's departure quoted Ahmed Bedier as saying: "Fechter's move confirms our suspicious all along that Michael Fechter has been acting as an agent for Steven Emerson, unethically acting as an agent for Steven Emerson, and saw Emerson more than just as a source but also as a mentor."

In an article published in the National Review Online (June 18, 2007), Emerson accused Safi of saying that the "assertion by 'world leaders' that the war on terrorism is not a war on Islam is nothing but a piece of propaganda and disinformation that was meant to appease Western Muslims and to maintain the coalition against terrorism."

While critics like Emerson and Daniel Pipes have censored Safi for his involvement with, and defense of, Muslim American organizations, others have commended his work for promoting forward looking understanding of Islam. Muqtedar Khan, University of Delaware Professor and Brookings Institution fellow, identified him among leading moderate Muslims involved in reforming Islamic thought. He has been called a Muslim reformer in an analysis by Barnabas Fund. Ed Brayton called Safi an advocate of freedom and democracy and a strong voice against Islamic radicalism.

Louay Safi is identified as one of several leading Muslim American reformers in a new book edited by Shireen Hunter and published in October 2009 by M.E. Sharpe under the title Reformist Voices of Islam. Tamara Sonn identified Safi as a leading Muslim American reformer whose influence "goes beyond the scholarly and intellectual communities and is being felt within the Muslim community at large, as shown by the changing character of the leadership of the Islamic Society of North America."

In 2009, Safi was invited to lecture on Islam to U.S. troops at Fort Hood. However, on December 7, 2009, 13 members of congress wrote a letter to Secretary of Defense Robert Gates asking him to revoke the invitation. The Members of Congress wrote the following in regards to Safi:

It has come to our attention that the Department of Defense has invited Louay Safi, a top official at the Islamic Society of North America, to give lectures on Islam to our troops at Fort Hood. If this is indeed true, we respectfully request that you end this practice. According to the Justice Department, ISNA is a prominent member of the Muslim Brotherhood, an organization with a network of known and suspected Islamic terrorist organizations spread throughout the world. The Brotherhood and its partner organizations regularly espouse violent jihad and anti-Semitism. More specifically, ISNA was identified by the Justice Department at the successful Holy Land Foundation terrorism financing conspiracy trial as an unindicted co-conspirator . ... Safi himself has been connected to an entity called the 'safa group.' Search warrants executed in 2002 were supported by an affidavit alleging its involvement in moving large sums of money to terrorist groups.

On Dec 9, 2009, The Dallas Morning News inquired about Louay Safi, and was told "He has not been the subject of any indictment. His presentations have always [met] the high standards expected." In January, the newspaper was informed by the military that Safi was under investigation and that his lectures had been suspended after complaints after Safi concluded lectures at Fort Hood. Thirteen Republican members of Congress asked Defense Secretary Robert Gates on Dec. 17 to halt lectures by anyone affiliated with ISNA on military bases.

ISNA published a refutation of Dallas Morning News' article, accusing the newspaper of painting "the Islamic Society of North America (ISNA) and Dr. Louay Safi, the Director of Communications and Leadership Development, in a negative light, and presented a distorted picture of ISNA that belies its actual work and contribution to society." The newspaper also published a response by Dr. Safi in which he charged DMN of mischaracterizing his views and publishing unsubstantiated claims borrowed from right-wing detractors.

== Books ==
- Islam and the Trajectory of Globalization Open Access Copy (Routledge, 2021)
- Palestine: Prophetic Principles Over Prophecies (CreateSpace Press, 2011)
- The Qur'anic Narrative (Prager, 2008)
- Leading with Compassion (CreateSpace, 2010)
- Blaming Islam: Examining the Religion Building Enterprise (Institute for Social Policy and Understanding, 2006)
- Tensions and Transitions in the Muslim World, (University Press of America, 2003)
- Peace and the Limits of War (International Institute of Islamic Thought, 2001)
- The Foundation of Knowledge (International Institute of Islamic Thought, 2009) (1st ed) and 2014 (2nd ed.)
- Al-'Aqidah wa al-Syiasah (International Institute of Islamic Thought, 1996)
- Truth and Reform (The Open Press, 1998)
- I'mal al 'Aql (Dar al-Fikr, 1998)
- The Challenge of Modernity (University Press of America, 1994)
