= Fatima Seedat =

South African scholar of Islam and gender

- Education: McGill University (Ph.D)
- Occupations: Islamic scholar, Senior lecturer, women's rights activist

Fatima Seedat is a South African feminist, Islamic scholar and women's rights activist. She is known for her scholarly work on gender and Islamic law, and Islam and feminism.

== Career ==
Seedat researches gender and Islamic law, Islam and feminism, and Muslim masculinity. She completed her PhD at McGill University, and her dissertation focused on gender and legal theory.

She is Senior Lecturer in Gender Studies at the University of Cape Town. Seedat is also Programme Convenor of the University of Cape Town's Mphil in Islam, Gender, and Sexuality with Sa'diyya Shaikh.

Seedat is one of the few Muslim women to act as an imam and deliver khutbahs. She is co-editor of The Women's Khutbah Book: Contemporary Sermons on Spirituality and Justice from around the World with Sa'diyya Shaikh. Two of Seedat's khutbahs are featured, "Knowing in and through Difference" and "Not a Nikah Khutbah."

Seedat is one of three female Muslim Marriage Officers in South Africa.

== Activism ==
Seedat was the parliamentary liaison for the South African Commission on Gender Equality. Seedat is the founder of Shura Yabafazi, a South African NGO that focuses on women in Muslim family law. Seedat has also worked with Equitas Human Rights Foundation, Women Living Under Muslim Laws, and UN Women Afghanistan.

She has worked with the South African Muslim Personal Law Network, which works in conjunction with Musawah. She has worked for more than 25 years with a variety of organisations to advocate for legal protections for women in Muslim marriages.

== Works ==
=== Books ===
- The Women's Khutbah Book: Contemporary Sermons on Spirituality and Justice from around the World (co-editor, Yale University Press, 2022)

=== Book chapters ===
- "South African Feminists in Search of the Sacred" in Surfacing: On Being Black and Feminist in South Africa (2021, Wits University Press)
- “Gender and the Study of Islamic Law: From Polemic to Ethics” in The Routledge Handbook on Gender and Islam (2020, Routledge)
- "Intersections and Assemblages: South Africans Negotiating Privilege and Marginality through Freedom of Religion and Sexual Difference" in Freedom of Religion at Stake: Competing Claims Among Faith Traditions, States, and Persons (2019, Pickwick Publications)

=== Academic papers ===
- "Between Boundaries, towards Decolonial Possibilities in a Feminist Classroom Holding a Space between the Qur'an and the Bible" in Religion and Theology (2020)
- "Queering the Study of Islam" in Journal of Feminist Studies in Religion
- A women’s march without God (the Father) in The Immanent Frame (2018)
- Sexual economies of war and sexual technologies of the body: Militarised Muslim masculinity and the Islamist production of concubines for the caliphate in Agenda: Empowering Women for Gender Equity (2017)
- "On Spiritual Subjects: Negotiations in Muslim Female Spirituality" in Journal of Gender and Religion in Africa (2016)
- Seedat (2013). "Islam, Feminism, and Islamic Feminism: Between Inadequacy and Inevitability". Journal of Feminist Studies in Religion. 29 (2): 25–45. doi:10.2979/jfemistudreli.29.2.25. S2CID 144930307.
