= Jamida Beevi =

Indian women's activist

Jamitha Teacher is a women's activist in Kerala, India and is the first woman to lead Friday prayers in India for a mixed congregation that had both men and women. She is the General Secretary of Quran Sunnat Society.

== Early life ==
She is the youngest of 13 children. Her father was an Indian Army soldier. She studied in the Jamia Nadwiyya Arabic College in Malappuram.

== Death threats ==
Her actions have sparked a negative response from some sections, with members of Muslim organisations threatening to kill her, according to local media. However, she says, "These are extremists who cannot tolerate any reform. I have had threats on WhatsApp, on YouTube, on Facebook, but I am not scared." She also said that "If need be I will ask for police protection but I will continue. How can India as country develop if we don't change all the things that are holding women back?"
