= Mary Sallom =

American Syrian-born physician (1884–1955)

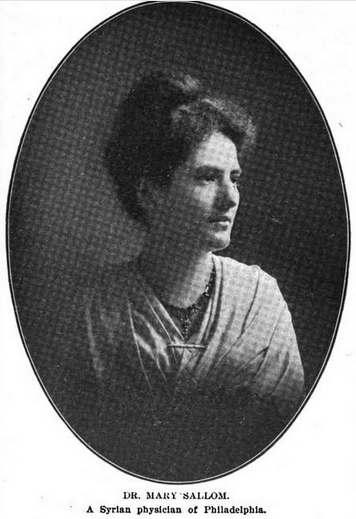
- Mary Sallom, from a 1911 publication
- Born: 3 October 1884; Syria
- Died: 3 March 1955 (aged 70); Philadelphia, Pennsylvania, U.S.
- Occupation: Physician

Mary Sallom (Arabic: ماري سالوم; 3 October 1884 – 3 March 1955) was a Syrian-born physician, based in Philadelphia, Pennsylvania. She had plans to build a hospital in Syria, and worked in infant and child health.

== Early life and education ==
Mary Sallom was born in Syria, in the Mount Lebanon region, the daughter of Kalil Sallom (Khalil Yacoub Salloum) and Barbara Ghosn (Gosen) Sallom. Her parents were from Kousba in present-day Lebanon, which Mary Sallom also considered her hometown. Her father was an agent for a shipping company, and the first president of the Syrian Benevolent Society of Philadelphia.

Sallom and her brother Abdullah both attended medical school in Philadelphia. Mary Sallom graduated from the Woman's Medical College in 1909.

== Career ==
In 1909 Sallom announced plans to build a hospital in Syria, with financial backing from her friend Helen M. Gould (daughter of Jay Gould) and in partnership with her brother, Abdullah K. Sallom.

Still in the United States in 1913 and 1918, Sallom was a member of the Child Hygiene Association, speaking on infant and child health to community groups, especially to young immigrant women. She organized at least three Little Mothers League chapters, to educate girls, some of them under the age of 10, who cared for younger siblings, "for it is most often upon them that the whole care of the little ones rests," she explained in 1913. "We have found that these little girls were very apt pupils, and were eager to learn."

== Publications ==
The Sallom siblings co-wrote an article on "The True Cause and Sequence of the Heart Beat" (1907) and another on double vision. Mary Sallom also published medical research on her own, including a statistical analysis of diphtheria cases, and a study of dosage in spinal anesthesia.

- "The True Cause and Sequence of the Heart Beat" (1907, with Abdullah K. Sallom)
- "A Theory of Diplopia" (1909, with Abdullah K. Sallom)
- "Preliminary Report of a Statistical Analysis of over 43,000 Cases of Diphtheria" (1910)
- "The Determination of the Dose of Stovaine in Spinal Anesthesia by Blood Pressure Observations" (1910)

== Personal life ==
Mary Sallom lived with her younger sister, Catherine Brewer, in her last years. She died in Philadelphia in 1955, at the age of 70. Her niece Aileen Sallom Freeman was a writer, artist, and local historian.
