= Sa'diyya Shaikh =

South African scholar

- Born: 1969 (age 56–57); Krugersdorp, South Africa
- Occupation: Islamic studies scholar
- Notable work: Sufi Narratives of Intimacy: Ibn 'Arabī, Gender, and Sexuality

Sa'diyya Shaikh (born 1969) is a South African scholar of Islam and feminist theory. She is a professor of religion at the University of Cape Town. Shaikh studies Sufism in relation to feminism and feminist theory. Shaikh is known for work on gender in Islam and 'Ibn Arabi.

== Biography ==
Sa'diyya Shaikh was born in 1969 in Krugersdorp, South Africa to Indian Muslim parents. She grew up under the apartheid regime and witnessed the anti-apartheid movement which influenced her to seek liberatory readings of the Qur'an and the Islamic tradition.

Shaikh has published works on Muslim women and gendered violence, feminist approaches to the Qur'an and hadith, contraception and abortion in Islam, and gender and Islamic law. Shaikh was a 2016-2017 fellow at the Wissenschaftskolleg Zu Berlin on the project "Gender, Justice and Muslim Ethics."

Shaikh is the author of Sufi Narratives of Intimacy: Ibn 'Arabi, Gender, and Sexuality. The book explores the thought of Ibn 'Arabi from a feminist perspective.

Shaikh is the co-author of The Women's Khutbah Book: Contemporary Sermons on Spirituality and Justice from around the World. Two khutbahs of Shaikh are featured, "Spirituality of the Ordinary" and "Divine Love, Human Love: Marriage as Heart-Cultivation".

== Works ==
Books

- Daniel C. Maguire and Sa'diyya Shaikh (eds). 2007. Violence Against Women in Contemporary World Religions: Roots and Cures. Cleveland, Ohio: The Pilgrim Press
- Shaikh, Sa'diyya. 2012. Sufi Narratives of Intimacy: Ibn 'Arabi, Gender and Sexuality. Chapel Hill: University of North Carolina Press
- Sa'diyya Shaikh and Fatima Seedat 2022. The Women's Khutbah Book: Contemporary Sermons on Spirituality and Justice from around the World. Yale University Press.

Journal Articles

- Moos, Shafieka and Shaikh, Sadiyya. 2024. "Maternal Identity and Muslim Ethics: South African Women’s Experiences." Religions 15, no 8: 927 https://doi.org/10.3390/rel15080927
- Shaikh, Sa’diyya. 2023. "Friendships, Fidelities and Sufi Imaginaries: Theorizing Islamic Feminism." Religions 14, no. 9: 1082. https://doi.org/10.3390/rel14091082
- Shaikh, S. 2022 “Ibn ʿArabī and Mystical Disruptions of Gender: Theoretical Explorations in Islamic Feminism.” Signs: Journal of Women and Culture in Society 47 no. 2 (Winter): 475-497.
- Shaikh, S. 2021. “Islamic Feminist Imaginaries: Love, Beauty and Justice.” The African Journal of Gender and Religion Vol. 27 (Dec) 2-16.
- Shaikh S. 2021. “Scholarly Journeys, Existential Entanglements; Embracing the Barzakh of Knowledge, Being and Ethics.” Journal for Islamic Studies, 39: 28 – 48
- Shaikh, Sa’diyya. 2019. Allah, Hidden Treasures and the Divine Feminine. Article at The Immanent Frame: Secularism, Religion and the Public Sphere, hosted by Social Science Research Council
- Mahomed, Nadeem and Shaikh. 2018. “Islam between Margins: Reassessing Gender and Sexuality in Islam.” The African Journal of Gender and Religion 24, no 2 (Dec): 120-138.
- Shaikh, Sa’diyya. 2018. Explorations in Islamic Feminist Epistemology. Article at Humanities Futures, Franklin Humanities Institute, Duke University
- Osman Mujahid and Shaikh, Sa’diyya. 2017. “Islam, Muslims and the Politics of Queerness in Cape Town.” Journal of Gender and Religion in Africa Vol. 23 No 2 (Dec): 43-67.
- Shaikh, Sa’diyya. 2015. “Ibn ‘Arabi and How to Be Human” Critical Muslims, Special Issue on Race 13: 91-108.
- Shaikh, Sa’diyya. 2013. “Feminism, Epistemology and Experience: Critically (En)gendering the Study of Islam.” Journal for Islamic Studies 33: 14-47.
- Hoel Nina and Shaikh, Sa’diyya 2013.“Sexing Islamic Theology: Theorising Women’s Experience and Gender Through abd allah and khalifah.” Journal for Islamic Studies 33: 127-151.
- Baderoon, Gabeba; Hoel, Nina and Shaikh, Sa’diyya, 2013. “Theorising Experience, Subjectivity and Narrative in Studies of Gender and Islam.” Journal for Islamic Studies 33: 3-13.
- Hoel, Nina and Shaikh, Sadiyya, 2013. “Sex as Ibadah: Religion, Gender and Subjectivity among South African Muslim Women.” Journal of Feminist Studies in Religion 29 (1): 69-91.
- Shaikh, Sa’diyya; Hoel, Nina and Kagee, Ashraf, 2011. “South African Muslim Women: Sexuality, Marriage and Reproductive Choices, Research Report” Journal for Islamic Studies, 31: 96-121.
- Hoel, Nina, Shaikh, Sadiyya and Kagee, Ashraf. 2011. “Muslim women's reflections on the acceptability of vaginal microbicidal products to prevent HIV infection.” Ethnicity & Health 16 (2): 89 – 106.
- Shaikh, Sa'diyya. 2009. "In Search of Al-Insān: Sufism, Islamic Law and Gender." Journal of the American Academy of Religion 77 (4): 781-822.
- Hoel, Nina and Shaikh, Sa'diyya. 2007. "Veiling, Secularism and Islamism: Gender Constructions in France and Iran". Journal for the Study of Religion, 20 (1): 111-129
- Shaikh, Sa’diyya and Kugle, Scott. 2006. “To Love Every Life as Your Own: An Introduction to Engaged Sufism”. Journal for Islamic Studies, 26: 1-11.
- Shaikh, S. 2004. “Knowledge, Women and Gender in the Hadith”. Islam and Christian- Muslim Relations, 15 (1):99-108.
- Shaikh, S. 1997. “Exegetical Violence: Nushuz in Qur’anic Gender Ideology”. Journal for Islamic Studies, 17: 49-73.

Book Chapters

- Shaikh, Sa’diyya. 2024. “Spiritual Abuse, Grooming and Religious Leaders: Rethinking Gender Ethics within Muslim Communities.” In Sexual Violence in Muslim Communities: Towards Awareness and Accountability, ed. Samah Choudhury and Juliane Hammer. 190-211. Boston: OpenBostonUniversity. https://hdl.handle.net/2144/49530
- Shaikh, S. 2022. “Spirituality and Gender.” In The Wiley-Blackwell Companion to Islamic Spirituality, edited by Vincent Cornell and Bruce Lawrence. New Jersey: John Wiley and Sons LTD, 199-215 https://www.wiley.com/en-us/The+Wiley+Blackwell+Companion+to+Islamic+Spirituality-p-9780470674208
- Shaikh, S. 2022. “Justice, Refinement and Beauty: Reflections on Marriage and Spirituality.” In Justice and Beauty in Muslim Marriage: Towards Egalitarian Ethics and Laws, edited by Ziba Mir-Hosseini, Mulki Al-Sharmani, Jana Rumminger and Sarah Marsso. London: Oneworld Press, 379-392.
- Shaikh, S. 2022. “Spirituality and Gender.” In The Wiley-Blackwell Companion to Islamic Spirituality, edited by Vincent Cornell and Bruce Lawrence. New Jersey: John Wiley and Sons LTD, 199-215
- Shaikh S, 2021. “Spiritual Fragrances, Social Horizons: A Muslim tribute to Archbishop Desmond Tutu.” In Ecumenical Encounters with Desmond Mpilo Tutu: Visions for Justice, Dignity and Peace, edited by Sarojini Nadar, Tinyiko Maluleke, Dietrich Werner, Vicentia Kgabe, and Rudolf Hinz. Bellville: University of the Western Cape Press & African Sun Media, 306-307.
- Shaikh, S. 2021. “Refining Islamic Feminisms: Gender, Subjectivity and the Divine Feminine” In Surfacing: On Being Black and Feminist in Southern Africa, edited by Desiree Lewis and Gabeba Baderoon, Johannesburg: Witwatersrand University Press,119-129.
- Claassens, L.J., Shaikh, S and Swartz, L. 2019. “Engaging Disability and Religion in an African Context.” In The Palgrave Handbook of Disability and Citizenship in the Global South, edited by Brian Watermeyer et al. Cham Switzerland: Palgrave Macmillan,147-164.
- Shaikh, S. 2018. “Spiritual Refinement.” In The Shari’a: History, Ethics and Law, edited by Amyn B. Sajoo. London: I.B. Tauris Muslim Heritage Series: 5, 81-99.
- Shaikh, Sa’diyya. 2016. "In Search of Al-Insān: Sufism, Islamic Law and Gender." In Gender and Sexuality in Islam. 4 Vols (Critical Concepts in Islamic Studies), edited by Omnia El-Shakry. London: Routledge, Vol., I, 57-92.
- Shaikh, Sa’diyya. 2015. “Islamic Law, Sufism and Gender: Rethinking the Terms of the Debate.” In Men in Charge? Rethinking Authority in the Muslim Legal Tradition, edited by Ziba Mir-Hosseini, Mulki Al-Sharmani and Jana Rumminger. Oxford: Oneworld, 106-131.
- Shaikh, Sa’diyya. 2012. “Engaging Surrender: The Intimacy and Power of the Gender Jihad.” In A Jihad for Justice: Honouring the Work and Life of Amina Wadud, edited by Kecia Ali, Julianne Hammer and Laury Silvers. 213-216. Ebook: http://www.bu.edu/religion/files/2010/03/A-Jihad-for-Justice-for-Amina-Wadud-2012-1.pdf. (ISBN 978-0-615-61454-0)
- Shaikh, Sa’diyya. 2011. “Morality, Justice and Gender: Reading Muslim tradition on Reproductive Choices.” In African Sexualities: A Reader, edited by Sylvia Tamale. Oxford: Pambazuka Press, 340-358.
- Shaikh, Sa’diyya. 2011. “Embodied Tafsir: South African Muslim Women Confront Gender Violence in Marriage.” In Gender and Islam in Africa: Rights, Sexuality, and Law, edited by Margot Badran. California: Stanford University Press, 89-115.
- Shaikh, Sa’diyya. 2010 “Knowledge, Women, and Gender in the Hadith: A Feminist Interpretation” In The Hadith. 4 Vols. (Critical Concepts in Islamic Studies Series), edited by Mustafa Shah. London: Routledge, Vol., IV, 252-261.
- Shaikh, S. 2009. “Centering the Transcendent in the Search for Muslim Political Responses.” In After the Honeymoon: Muslim Religious Leadership and Political Engagement in Post-Apartheid South Africa, edited by Aslam Fataar and Farid Esack. Cape Town: Center for the Study of Progressive Islam, 41-45. ISBN 978-0-620-43769-1
- Shaikh, Sa'diyya. 2007. “A Tafsir of Praxis: Gender, Marital Violence, and Resistance in a South African Muslim Community”. In Violence Against Women in Contemporary World Religions: Roots and Cures, edited by Dan Maguire and Sa’diyya Shaikh. Ohio: The Pilgrim Press, 66-89.
- Shaikh Sa’diyya. 2009. “Una tafsir (exegesi) mitjançant la praxi: gènere, violència matrimonial i resistència en una comunitat musulmana africana.” In 'La veu de la dona a l'Alcorà. Una perspectiva feminista' (trans. Women's Voice in the Quran. A feminist reading), edited by Abdennur Prado Barcelona: Llibres de l'Índex, 143-170 (Catalan Translation and Republication of “Tafsir of Praxis”.)
- Shaikh, S. 2006. “Knowledge, Women and Gender in the Hadith: A Feminist Interpretation”. In Islam and Other Religions: Pathways to Dialogue, Essays in honour of Mahmoud Mustapha Ayoub, edited by Irfan Omar. London: Routledge, 87-96. (republished 2004 journal article)
- Shaikh, S. 2004. “A’isha” In Encyclopedia of Islam and the Muslim World, ed. by R.C. Martin. New York: Macmillan. p32-33
- Shaikh, S. 2003. “Family Planning, Contraception and Abortion In Islam: Undertaking Khilafah: Moral Agency, Justice and Compassion”. In Sacred Rights: The Case for Contraception and Abortion in World Religions, edited by Daniel Maguire. Oxford: Oxford University Press.
- Shaikh, S. 2003. “Transforming Feminisms: Islam, Women and Gender Justice”. In Progressive Muslims: On Justice, Gender and Pluralism, edited by Omid Safi. Oxford: Oneworld Publications, 147-162.
- Shaikh, S. 2000. “Narratives on Narration: A Feminist Hermeneutics on Hadith”. In Claiming our Footprints: South African Women reflect on Context, Identity and Spirituality, edited by D. Ackermann, E. Getmann, H. Kotze, and J. Tobler. South Africa: EFSA Institute for Theology and Interdisciplinary Research and the Circle of Concerned African Women Theologians. ISBN 1-874917-21-3.
- Shaikh, S. 1996. “The Veil: A Feminist Theological Analysis”. In Groaning in Faith: African Women in the Household of God, edited by Musimbi Kanyoro and Nyambura Njoroge. Nairobi: Acton Publishers, 85-98. ISBN 9966-888-24-1.
