= Muslims for Progressive Values =

Muslim human rights organization

Muslims for Progressive Values (MPV) is a grassroots human rights organization founded and incorporated by Zuriana (Ani) Zonneveld and Pamela K. Taylor in 2007. Headquartered in Los Angeles California, MPV has chapters around the United States as well as regional offices in Malaysia, the Netherlands as well as various other countries under different names such as Universal Muslim Community. It also has separate networks in Bangladesh, Canada, France, Chile, Germany, the Netherlands and Australia & throughout the U.S.

MPV provides educational and theological resources for Muslims with a liberal and progressive Islamic worldview. The main focus of MPV's work is to stimulate critical thinking of sacred texts, as it relates to promoting the implementation of progressive values, such as human rights and gender equality, which according to MPV, are both deeply rooted in both Islamic and Democratic principles.

In response to the global discourse of criticism and the radicalization of Islam, MPV seeks to dismiss what it believes to be false ideologies about Muslims and Islam. Through their global advocacy and community programs MPV seeks to enlighten Muslims and non-Muslim populations globally. On October 1, 2017, in Tunisia, MPV was a founding member of the Alliance of Inclusive Muslims, an umbrella human rights association made up of 14 member organizations spanning five continents.

In December 2013, United Nations recognized Muslims for Progressive Values as an official non-government organization (NGO) association member. The NGO/DPI Executive Committee represents 1,500 NGO organizations with monthly meetings. In January 2018, MPV secured its ECOSOC-accredited status at the United Nations. MPV's consultative status enable its advocacy to go global by challenging human rights abuses in the name of Sharia law of Muslim-majority countries at the United Nations in New York through its High Political Level Forum, and at the Human Rights Council in Geneva on issues of women's rights, LGBT rights, freedom of expression and freedom of and from religion and belief.

MPV has a board of advisors including scholars and activists such as: Reza Aslan, Amir Hussein, Karima Bennoune, Daayiee Abdullah, Zainah Anwar, Saleemah Abdul-Ghafur, and El-Farouk Khaki. Mona Eltahaway is also associated with the movement.

== Goal and vision ==
The mission of Muslims for Progressive Values (MPV) is to embody and be an effective voice of the traditional Qur'anic ideals of human dignity, egalitarianism, compassion and social justice. Muslims for Progressive Values (MPV) envisions Islam as an Islamic community that embodies the ten principles of MPV. Further, MPV envisions a future where Islam is understood as a source of dignity, justice, compassion and love for all humanity and the world.

== Guiding principles ==
MPV is guided by the ten principles which are in Islam.

== Community-level programming ==
MPV carries out grassroots activities through its local chapters in the US, namely in Atlanta, Columbus, Washington DC, Chicago, New York, San Francisco and Los Angeles, and in Australia, Canada, Chile, France, and Malaysia. These activities promote the mission and values of MPV at the local level. Their activities fall under the following categories: Arts, Faith-Based Initiatives, Social Justice, and Educational Campaigns.

=== MPV Unity Mosques ===
MPV Chapters offer progressive and inclusive prayer spaces in the US and Canada. All members of the community—men, women, and LGBTQ members—take turn leading prayers, giving sermon and doing the call to prayer, adhan. MPV mosques are 100% funded by members of the community.

- Located at 5998 W Pico Boulevard, Los Angeles, CA 90035-2657 and members can also attend virtually. The adhan, prayer and khutbah may be led by a man or a woman, and the congregants participate together. Individual men and women can choose to stand/sit one side or the other if they prefer.

=== #ImamsForShe initiative ===
MPV launched a global initiative in March 2015 to address misogynist interpretations of Islamic scripture and traditions that have led to human rights violations carried out in the name of Islam against women and girls and the sub-human status of women and girls across Muslim-majority countries and within Muslim communities in the West. The initiative's purpose is to support and provide solidarity for Imams, Muslim lay leaders and Islamic scholars who actively advocate for women's rights, for empowerment and gender equality, and debunk misogyny in the name of Islam.

=== MPV nikah/officiant services ===
MPV provides nikah/officiant services for all, including same-sex and interfaith couples.

=== MPV khutbahs ===
MPV provides khutbahs (sermons). They have an open format for sermons (khutbahs). Their sermons can be provided by anyone either in written format or in person.

=== Educational campaigns ===
MPV creates of specific progressive ijtihad content targeted to youth. Their content is distributed via social media, forums, lectures, YouTube, podcasts, music, arts festivals and other communication vehicles utilized by youth. The organization shares educational materials and raises awareness through conferences, universities and seminars.

=== Social justice ===
MPV's participates in social justice movements and events such as International Women's Day, Human Rights Day, and Pride celebrations. MVP actively builds alliances and partnerships US-based organizations, such as Sauti Yetu and other organizations, on the domestic issues of Female Genital Mutilation/Cutting, child/forced marriages, and women's reproductive rights.

MPV actively advocates for key changes on issues of gender equality, LGBTQ+ rights, freedom of expression. and freedom of and from belief within American Muslim communities.

=== Faith-based initiatives ===
MPV supports the Unity Mosques in their religious activities, such as Eid prayer services and Quran studies.

MPV conducts marriages, including interfaith and same-sex Islamic marriages.

MPV engages and collaborates with Islamic scholars in disseminating sound progressive Qur'anic ijtihad based on traditional Qur'anic texts.

=== Arts ===
MPV creates specific progressive ijtihad content targeted to youth. This content is distributed via social media, forums, lectures, YouTube, music, arts festivals and other communication vehicles utilized by youth, thus by-passing established religious and political institutions.

MPV sponsors and host lecture series, faith/interfaith-based services, arts, music and theater events that promote inclusive expressions of Islam.

MPV develops comprehensive media and public relations campaigns that includes strategic use of press releases, social media, earned media, and cultural expressions.

== Global advocacy programming ==
On a global level, MPV carries out activities geared at advocating against human rights abuses carried out in the name of Islam in Muslim-majority states. the organization particularly monitors human rights issues in Muslim-majority countries related to women's rights, LGBTQI rights, freedom of and from religion and freedom of expression. Their Global Advocacy Work falls under the following categories: Educational Campaign, Analysis, Advocacy and Outreach.

=== Educational campaign ===
MPV produces, translates, and circulates educational materials addressing key areas of concern, such as infographics, social media content, short videos.

MPV circulates and translates shadow reports, policy briefs, and statements.

=== Analysis ===
MPV produces statements, policy briefs and shadow reports to be shared with country representatives, policy makers, civil society and lay audience.

MPV monitors human rights issues in Muslim-majority countries.

MPV collects of grassroots information on human rights issues in Muslim-majority countries.

=== Events ===
MPV participates in debates, interactive dialogues, panel discussions and informal meetings with relevant Member States of the UN, civil society leaders and like-minded religious and non-religious non-governmental organizations. MPV organizes and attends parallel events and hosting of speakers, including scholars in Islam, progressive religious leaders and civil society leaders, to share their expertise and first-hand accounts on human rights issues to a global audience.

=== Advocacy and outreach ===
MPV shares their mission, vision and guiding principles with women and LGBTQ+ human rights advocates, religious minority advocates, UN Member States, human rights NGOs and members of relevant UN human rights committees to for purposes of alliance, solidarity, and collaborations

MPV promotes perspectives derived from their work and analyses to the UN Office of the High Commissioner for Human Rights (OHCHR), UN treaty bodies and special mechanisms, and international, regional, and national NGOs involved in international advocacy.

== MPV in the news ==
MPV is widely covered in America and global and Muslim media such as BBC, TIME Magazine, Al-Jazeera, Russia Today, the Los Angeles Times, OpenDemocracy, CNN, The New York Times, and HuffPost.

Media mentions:

- "American Muslims Challenge Transgenderism- and each other," Public Discourse, October 2019.
- "Were Muslim Groups Duped Into Supporting an LGBTQ Rights Petition at the US Supreme Court?", Muslim Matters, July 2019.
- "How the Progressive Left Wants to Change Islam in America," Muslim Matters, September 2017.
- "Breaking The Mould," BBC World Service, July 2015.
- "Un-Islamic to Criminalise Homosexuality - Muslim Group with Malaysian Links," Malay Mail Online, June 2015.
- "#ImamsForShe Launched," VoicesOfNY.org, April 2015.
- "Open Letter to Saudi King Salman," AlJazeera.com, February 2015.
- "Why Do Progressive Religious Institutions Support Conservative Muslims? Part 1," Huffington Post, April 2014.
- "A new Muslim Renaissance is Here," TIME, April 2014.
- "A Lesbian Muslim Unveiled - Moving Forward with Muslims for Progressive Values," SheWired.com, January 2013.
- "Progressive Muslims Launch Gay-Friendly, Women-Led Mosques In Attempt to Reform American Islam," Huffington Post, March 2012.

== Awards and recognition ==
MPV has received worldwide recognition for the work it has carried out and its uncompromising messaging. In 2006, the American Society for Muslim Advancement named Ani Zonneveld "A Muslim Leader of Tomorrow". Recognized as an international progressive movement, MPV secured its consultative status at the United Nations in December 2013. In 2014, MPV was awarded for its activism for LGBTQ+ rights by The Inner Circle, South Africa. In 2014, Ani Zonneveld was recognized by the LGBTQ+ magazine and website Advocate.com as a religious leader that gives hope to LGBTQ+ individuals. Ani Zonneveld has been named as one of the world's 100 WISE Muslim Women.

== Controversy and criticism ==
Muslims For Progressive Values was accused of going against the mainstream values of Islam in a July 2019 article by Southern California attorney Ahmed Shaikh. In Muslim Matters, an online magazine that focuses on Western Muslim issues, Ahmed Shaikh writes, "For any Muslim organization dedicated to Islam, it is not a difficult decision to expel an organization explicitly dedicated to spreading haram [forbidden by Islamic law]." In reference to the prior quote, Ahmed Shaikh states that in July 2017, "Muslims for Progressive Values (MPV), was expelled from the Islamic Society of North America (ISNA) Convention bazaar...The reason: MPV was dedicated to promoting ignorance of Islam among Muslims at the event. The booth had literature claiming haram was good and virtuous. Propaganda distributed at the table either implied haram was not haram or alternately celebrated haram." The Islamic Society of North America is the largest Muslim organization in North America.

Shaikh's article further states "It would be charitable to the point of fraud to characterize MPV as a Muslim organization" and goes on to infer the claim that MPV has utilized attorney services to dupe a less sophisticated Muslim group into signing onto an Amicus Brief with which it does not agree with.

In their 2023 article on Muslim amicus curiae arguments at the U.S. Supreme Court, Bajwa and Miller observed that Muslims for Progressive Values and other progressive Muslim organizations like Muslim Advocates conflate American Muslim interests with those of minority groups more generally, believing that it is as an imperative for Muslims to support same-sex marriage and expansive gender identities from majoritarian interference. American Muslims who oppose such views and who disagree with expansive sex, gender, and marriage norms tend to emphasize Islamic scripture and religious doctrine when filing amicus briefs: "doctrinally oriented Muslims do not view the Islamic community as coextensive with a marginalized minority group, nor do doctrinally oriented Muslims advocate for their political and legal rights through this construct. To them, the category Muslim cannot be reduced to a minority identity because Islam is believed to be a universal religion which includes, in the United States, adherents from an exhaustive cross section of society (including white and other Americans from privileged backgrounds that do not fit into the minority or other popular social justice and identity politics rubrics in use today)."
