= Timeline of South Asian and diasporic LGBTQ history =

This is a timeline of notable events in the history of non-heterosexual conforming people of South Asian ancestry, who may identify as LGBTIQGNC (lesbian, gay, bisexual, transgender, intersex, queer, third gender, gender nonconforming), men who have sex with men, or related culturally-specific identities such as Hijra, Aravani, Thirunangaigal, Khwajasara, Kothi, Thirunambigal, Jogappa, Jogatha, or Shiva Shakti. The recorded history traces back at least two millennia.

This timeline includes events both in South Asia and in the global South Asian diaspora, as the histories are deeply linked. South Asia includes the modern day nations of Bangladesh, Bhutan, Burma (Myanmar), India, Maldives, Nepal, Sri Lanka; in some references, the South Asian subcontinent will also include Afghanistan, Pakistan, and Tibet. The South Asian diaspora includes, but is not limited to South Asian LGBTQ communities in the United States, United Kingdom, Canada, Australia, Caribbean Islands, Southeast Asia, and elsewhere.

== Early history ==
400 BCE - 200 BCE

- Sculptures on temples and artwork from around 500 BC in Lanka depict liberal views on sexuality and homosexuality.
- Vatsyayana's The Kama Sutra devotes an entire chapter to homosexuality with explicit detailed instructions on how to perform homosexual acts.

3rd century BC to c. 4th century AD

- Tamil Sangam literature refers to relationships between two men and explores the lives of trans women in the Aravan cult in Koovagam village in Tamil Nadu.

~1529

- Emperor Babur's memoirs, the Baburnama, include a recollection of a supposed homoerotic relationship with a teenage boy.

1530s

- The Fatawa-e-Alamgiri of the Mughal Empire mandated a common set of punishments for homosexuality, which could include 50 lashes for a slave, 100 for a free infidel, or death by stoning for a Muslim.

1750-1830

- Emergence of Rekhti chapti-namahs, or female non-sexual homosocial narratives, in Urdu poetry.

1861

- Anti-sodomy section of Offences against the Person Act 1861 imposed on entire British Empire, that says "Whosoever shall be convicted of the abominable Crime of Buggery, committed either with Mankind or with any Animal, shall be liable, at the Discretion of the Court, to be kept in Penal Servitude for Life or for any Term not less than Ten Years." This section is credited with giving birth to the controversial Section 377 of the Indian Penal Code.

1871

- Hijras labeled a "criminal tribe" under the Criminal Tribes Act, 1871, meaning they could be arrested as criminals anywhere in British India.

1897

- Criminal Tribes Act of 1871 amended, with the subtitle "An Act for the Registration of Criminal Tribes and Eunuchs", ordering that "criminal" eunuchs "dressed or ornamented like a woman in a public street… be arrested without warrant" and imprisoned.

1918

- (United States) Earliest known records of South Asian MSM in North America, as Tara Singh and Jamil Singh are separately arrested for interracial sodomy in Sacramento, CA.

1922

- Poems Written in Prison by Gopabandhu Das, a freedom fighter and Gandhian, is published. At least two poems address male friends and co-workers, and the author describes these relationships in terms that are intense and erotically charged though not overtly sexual. These poems are sometimes included in Odia language literature textbooks.

1924

- "Chocolate", a short story in Hindi written by nationalist and social reformer Pandey Bechan Sharma (under the penname Ugra), is published in the nationalist newspaper Matvala. Ugra's crusade against male-to-male sex sparks debate in Hindi newspapers and magazines, resulting in perhaps the first public debate in Hindi on homosexuality.

1929

- Mahatma Gandhi speaks out against same-sex relations in a Young India letter, in response to queries on "unnatural vices" in schools.

1936

- Urdu poet Firaq Gorakhpuri writes an essay defending the Ghazal form of poetry that includes a defence of homosexuality, citing philosophers, poets and other renowned figures across the East and the West who were homosexual or had expressed homosexual desire in well-known works.

1942

- Ismat Chugtai's short story "Lihaaf" is published.

1944

- Ismat Chughtai faces obscenity trial for "Lihaaf".

1945

- Ismat Chughtai publishes her semi-autobiographical Tehri Lakeer ("The Crooked Line"), an Urdu novel that does not shy away from sexuality and depiction of same-sex attraction.

1962

- (India) Rajendra Yadav, a leading Hindi novelist, publishes his story "Prateeksha" ("Waiting") that depicts a homosexual relation between two women without censure and in detail.

1968

- (India) Bhupen Khakhar, a successful painter and writer of Gujarati fiction, and one of the few who is openly homosexual, writes an untitled story depicting bisexuality in a quotidian, lower middle-class context.

== 1970s ==
~1970s

- (India) Gay Scene journal published in Calcutta (only a few issues published)

1971

- Badnam Basti released, often described as India's first gay film

1972

- (India) Indian poet Kamala Das serialized her semi-fictionalized autobiography My Story in 1972, creating a minor scandal. The autobiography revealed her extramarital heterosexual affairs and her adolescent crush on a female teacher and a brief lesbian encounter with an older student. It was first published as a book in Malayalam in 1973, followed by an edited English version in 1976.

1974

- Malayalam novel Randu Penkuttikal ("Two Girls") by V. T. Nandakumar is published in India. The novel gives a positive picture of lesbian relationships in Kerala, and became very popular among young women.

1978

- (India) Noted math prodigy Shakuntala Devi publishes "The World of Homosexuals". The book is primarily a collection of interviews with homosexual men and advocates for societal acceptance of homosexuality.

1979

- (India) Begum Barve, a Marathi play written and directed by Satish Alekar, is performed for the first time by Theatre Academy, Pune, at Shriram Centre in New Delhi. Begum Barve, the central character, plays female parts and desires to live a woman's life.
- (India) The story "A Double Life" by well known Rajasthani author Vijay Dan Detha is published, depicting a romantic-sexual relationship between two women "married" to each other in rural Rajasthan.

== 1980s ==
Late 1970s / early 1980s

- (India) Partner, a one-act play written by Dr. Anand Nadkarni, explores the relationship between two male hostel inmates in love, and the complications when one of them gets married
- (India) Two college students in love, Mallika and Lalitatambika, attempt suicide.
- (India) The Delhi Group formed; Red Rose Rendezvous Group started. Indian women in Delhi active in creating spaces, dialogue, or research: Giti, Kanchana, Gita, Abha, and Paola

1981

- All-India Hijra Conference in Agra brings together over 50,000 hijras from across South Asia.
- (India) "Mitrachi Goshta", a lesbian theme play in Marathi written by eminent playwright Vijay Tendulkar opens in Mumbai and Thane. The play portrays the inner conflict of a woman who realizes she is lesbian. It was well received, and ran for 26 shows. (15 August)

1982/1983/1984

- Uma, a New Zealand lesbian of Indian descent interviewed in "Australia: Uma — speaks out about being Black, feminist and lesbian", Connexions, no. 10 "Global Lesbianism 2", Oakland, CA, pp. 5–7, Fall 1983. Uma established the first Lesbian Line in Australia in the early 1980s, and later served on ILGA's World Board as the Regional Representative Oceania.
- (United Kingdom) Article in Spare Rib, a grassroots British feminist magazine, "...NO, WE NEVER GO OUT OF FASHION ... FOR EACH OTHER!" Interview with Audre Lorde, Dorothea, Jackie Kay and Uma.
- Vikram Seth writes in the poem "Dubious", which appears in his first collection Mappings, about bisexuality: "In the strict ranks of Gay and Straight / What is my status? / Stray? or Great?"
- (United Kingdom) HAC Asian Theatre tours On the Road to Nowhere with sketches and visuals on race, power, sexuality, gender non-conforming roles, being gay, to Asian audiences that cause a press storm and calls for censorship.

1984

- (Canada) Zami, first Canadian group formed for Black and West Indian gays and lesbians (Toronto).

1985

- (United States) Anamika, a newsletter for South Asian lesbians and queer women publishes the first of its three issues, mailed free to women in South Asia.
- (United Kingdom) Films: My Beautiful Laundrette directed by Stephen Frears, based on a screenplay written by Hanif Kureishi, depicts an interracial relationship between two men.
- Books: "The Conversations of Cow" by Suniti Namjoshi (some references to first publication in 1984)

1986

- First case of HIV reported in India, in Chennai.
- (United States) Trikon (later renamed Trikone) is formed by Arvind Kumar and Suvir, and print newsletter established
- (United States) First issue of Trikon newsletter, editors Arvind Kumar and Suvir (January)
- (India) Ashok Row Kavi discusses his homosexuality in Savvy magazine (February)
- Hijra conference in Bhopal, India (April)
- (United States) Trikone marches in San Francisco Pride parade for the first time ever (June).
- (United States) Trikone Los Angeles (later Satrang) formed (Nov)
- (United States) Trikone Chicago (later Sangat, and then reformed Trikone Chicago) formed by Ifti Nasim (Dec)
- (United States) Conditions: Thirteen publishes interview with Khayal and Utsa, "There Are, Always Have Been, Always Will Be Lesbians in India".
- Kanchana researches Hindu text for women loving women references.
- Films
  - (United Kingdom) Pratibha Parmar releases Emergence, interviews with Four Black and Third World women artists that highlight common themes in identity and struggle
- Books
  - (Canada) Flesh and Paper by Suniti Namoshi and Gillian Eve Hanscombe

1987

- (India) Sneha Sangam gay group forms in Bangalore
- Society magazine in India prints a story about Trikone
- (Canada) Khush, an organization that created safe spaces for South Asian gays and lesbians in Toronto was formed (July).
- (United States) Trikon becomes incorporated as Trikone (Nov)
- (India) Bhopal policewomen Lila and Urmila marry with religious priest and get fired from police job (Dec)
- (India) Village teachers Aruna Sombhai Jaisinghbhai Gohil, aged 31, and Sudha Amarsinh Mohansinh Ratanwadia, aged 29, entered maitri karar (friendship agreement) before a notary public in 1987 after nine years together
- (United Kingdom) London Borough of Ealing Race Equality Unit holds the first London South Asian LGBTQ poetry festival organised by Race Equality Campaigns Officer, Poulomi Desai with the bookshop, Bogle L'overture in defiance of Section 28
- (United Kingdom) SAGALG set up by Shivananda Khan and Poulomi Desai which later becomes Shakti
- Books
  - Between the Lines: An Anthology by Pacific/Asian lesbians of Santa Cruz, California includes Anu's chapter "Sexuality, Lesbianism, and South Asian Feminism"

1988

- (United Kingdom) Shakti formed in London by Shivananda Khan, Poulomi Desai, Sunil Gupta, Atul Sarin, Manjit Rooprah, Savi Hensman, Pratibha Parmar - the first South Asian LGBT organisation in Europe (June)
- Trikone (San Francisco), Khush (Toronto), Shakti (London) and Urvashi Vaid make the Illustrated Weekly of India. (September)
- (United Kingdom) First Shakti Bhangra disco in London organised by Shivananda Khan, Poulomi Desai with DJ Ritu. Seed funding given to Shakti by the Ealing Race Equality Unit. (Oct)
- Gita Darji and Kishori Shah RIP

1989

- (Canada) Khush Kahayal, newsletter of Khush South Asian gay men of Toronto, is established.
- (United Kingdom) Shakti Khabar published in London.
- Dominic D'Souza arrested placed in solitary confinement in India because he is HIV+ (Feb)
- (Canada) Khush organizes Salaam Toronto! Festival (May)
- (United States) Urvashi Vaid becomes executive director of the National Gay and Lesbian Task Force (July)
- (Canada) South Asian AIDS Coalition (later ASAAP) formed in Toronto (Jul)
- (Canada) Khush and gay Asians organize Unity Among Asians conference in Toronto
- (Canada) "Salaam Toronto" conference
- (United States) South Asian Gay Association (SAGA, later renamed SALGA) founded in New York City
- Sojourner publishes "Breaking Silence: Coming Out in India", Sharmeen Islam
- South Asian Gay Association formed by 12 South Asians

== 1990s ==
1990

- (India) Red Rose Meetings start in New Delhi for gay men
- Indian lesbians attend Asian Lesbian Network conference in Bangkok
- (Canada) Alliance for South Asian AIDS Prevention founded
- (India) Lila's father files case under Section 377 against Lila's partner Tarulata who underwent FTM sex change to marry Lila Chavda in 1989 (Apr)
- (United States) Shamakami newsletter for South Asian lesbian and bi women comes out (Jun)
- India's first gay magazine, Bombay Dost, founded by Ashok Row Kavi (Jun)
- (India) Freedom newsletter published in Gulbarga (Sep)
- (India) Fun Club starts in Calcutta to organize social gatherings (Dec)
- (Canada) Desh Pardesh (1990 - 2001, multidisciplinary queer South Asian arts festival in Toronto, Ontario). See citation for oral history project about the festival.
- Vandana Cibbal and Simmi Kapoor RIP
- Films:
  - 1990 "Our People - HIV/AIDS and the Black Communities" Picture Talk Films directed by Ash Kotak for BHAN (Black HIV/AIDS Network). Funded by the Department of Health. In English, several Sth Asian languages and Cantonese. Winner of a British Medical Association Silver Award 1991
  - Jareena: Portrait of a Hijra by Prem Kalliat
  - Flesh and Paper by Pratibha Parmar about Suniti Namjoshi
- Books:
  - Trying to Grow by Firdaus Kanga

1991

- (United States) South Asian Gay Association in New York City changes name to South Asian Lesbian Gay Association (SALGA) as more women join (Feb)
- (India) Sakhi formed in New Delhi (Jul)
- Salaam (Queer Muslims in Canada) founded by El-Farouk Khaki in Toronto
- (United Kingdom) Naz Project formed in London by Shivanandan Khan and Poulomi Desai (Oct)
- AIDS Bhedbhav Virodhi Andolan (ABVA) publishes "Less than Gay", the first citizen's report on homosexuality in India (Nov)
- (India) Pravartak published in Calcutta
- Books:
  - Khush: An Investigation into South Asian Lesbians and Gay Men and Their Lives edited by Shivananda Khan and Pratibha Parmar, and SHAKTI, published in London by the Naz Project
- Films:
  - Bolo! Bolo! By Gita Saxena and Ian Rashid
  - Eunuchs: India's Third Gender by Michael Yorke for BBC
  - Khush – landmark doc by Pratibha Parmar
  - Khush Refugees by Nidhi Singh

1992

- Companions on a Journey founded by Sherman de Rose in Sri Lanka
- (India) Activist Siddhartha Gautam, a lawyer who founded the AIDS Bhedbhav Virodhi Andolan (ABVA) in 1989–90 to raise public awareness about HIV/AIDS and protest discriminatory policies, passes away in New Delhi at age 28.
- (India) Udaan founded in Mumbai to work with MSM
- (Canada) Atish Network formed in Vancouver
- Dominic D'Souza, AIDS activist, dies
- (United States) SALGA marches in New York's India Day parade
- Books:
  - Invisible Minority – The Unknown World of the Indian Homosexual by Arvind Kala

1993

- (India) Friends of Siddhartha Gautam organize a film festival in Delhi in his memory.
- (Canada) Discovery '93, the Khush gay men's conference in Toronto
- (India) Khush Club forms in Mumbai of gay men
- (Canada) Sami Yoni, a journal for lesbians of South Asian descent, published in Toronto.
- Pratibha Parmar receives Frameline Award for contributions to queer cinema
- (United States) Khush-list born on harvard.edu listserv by Devesh Khatu and Marty
- (India) Counsel Club formed in Calcutta
- (India) Aarambh newsletter/magazine debuts in New Delhi (need better reference)
- (United States) Trikone Atlanta born
- (India) Naz and Sakhi Seminar on Alternative Sexualities in New Delhi
- (India) Samraksha AIDS organization formed in Bangalore (Dec)
- Modern-day traditional wedding Aditya Advani and Michael Tarr performed by Swami Bodhananda
- Books:
  - Queer Looks edited by Pratibha Parmar, John Greyson, Martha Gever.
  - Feminist Fables by Suniti Namjoshi
  - Out on Main Street by Shani Mootoo
  - Lotus of Another Color, edited by Rakesh Ratti
  - "Gay angst" (review of Lotus of Another Color), India Today, 30 June 1993.
  - Shobha De's Strange Obsession (1993), a rambunctious novel about lesbian love published by Penguin Books of India.
- Play: Draupadi's Robes by Raminder Kaur, starring Parminder Sekhon and Poulomi Desai. The production included poetry, music and dance with performers from London's Asian LGBTTQI communities

1994

- (India) Vadamalli by novelist Su.Samuthiram is the first Tamil novel about Aravaani community in Tamil Nadu
- (India) G.A.Y (Good as You) group formed in Bangalore
- (United States) TIME names Urvashi Vaid one of the top leaders under 40
- Humsafar Trust registered in India
- All India Hijra Kalyan Sabha got voting rights in India
- (United States) SALGA hosts Pride Utsav in New York, during Stonewall 25
- (India) ABVA challenges Section 377 of the Indian Penal Code in court after condom distribution prohibited in Tihar Jail, Delhi.
- (United States) Khush-DC formed in Washington DC
- (United States) South Asian Lesbian and Gay Association (SALGA) banned from marching in the New York City India Day Parade, but protested along with Sakhi, a women's organization.
- (United States) MASALA formed in Boston
- (India) Vimla Farooqui of National Federation of Indian Women asks PM to stop gay meet claiming homosexuality is Western
- SALGA –Philadelphia formed
- (United States) Abraham Verghese's My Own Country wins Lambda Literary Award
- (India) Naz/Humsafar Gay Men's Conference in Bombay
- First gay conference in India reported (incorrectly) by Erie Gay News in Feb 1995. Conference said to have happened Dec (1994). See 1981.
- (Canada) Chhota Khayal, monthly calendar of Khush, Toronto
- Books
  - (Sri Lanka) / (Canada) Funny Boy by Shyam Selvadurai
  - Funny Boys and Funny Girls: Notes on a Queer South Asian Planet by Gayathri Gopinath
- Films:
  - Destiny, Desire and Devotion by Zahid Dar

1995

- SAGrrls list serve launched by Jasbir Puar and others
- (United States) Pride Utsav hosted by Trikone in San Francisco (Jun)(parent of DesiQ)
- (United States) Trikone's website debuts – the first ever for a South Asian LGBT group
- (Canada) Activist Kalpesh Oza, AIDS researcher and Desh Pradesh artist/organizer, passes away in Toronto (Jun)
- (Canada) Awaz-e-Atish: Voice of Fire publication by Atish Network Society (1995-1996)
- Sulaiman Mohammed, founding member of Atish, passes away (Aug)
- South Asia lesbians and bisexual women at Beijing Women's Conference (Sep)
- (India) Humsafar Center inaugurated in Bombay (Oct)
- (India) Stree Sangam (later renamed LABIA) founded in Bombay
- (United States) Trikone gets San Francisco Gay and Lesbian Historical Society Award (Oct)
- (India) (United States) Anuja Gupta, who worked with ABVA, an Indian AIDS prevention group, testifies at tribunal on human rights violations against sexual minorities in New York (Oct)
- (United States) Khuli Zaban founded by Leema Khan and Neena Hemmady in Chicago (Oct).
- (United States) Trikone and SALGA get NGLTF Community Service Award (Nov)
- (Canada) Queer Issue of Rungh, a South Asian quarterly of culture, comment, and criticism
- (United Kingdom) Club Kali opens
- (India) Pravartak renamed to Naya Pravartak
- (India) + (United Kingdom) From the Coffee Table to the Kit(s)chen - an exhibition of Queer Asian portraits by Poulomi Desai, curated by Preet Paul opens at the Oxford bookstore and Gallery in Kolkatta during riots.
- Book:
  - (United States) Virtual Equality by Urvashi Vaid released.
- Plays:
  - Ash Kotak's Maa played at The Royal Court, London, produced by Moti Roti

1996

- (India) Kali becomes first hijra to stand for elections in Bihar (Judicial Reforms Party) (Apr)
- (India) Stree Sangam organizes First National Gathering of Women who Love Women in Mumbai (Jun)
- (United States) Trikone-Tejas formed in Texas and hosts first public event (Oct)
- (United States) Outlook magazine says Lucknow leads the pack in India for gay sex (Oct)
- (United States) Poet Ifti Nasim inducted into Chicago Lesbian and Gay Hall of Fame (Oct)
- Arvind Kumar and Ashok Jethanandi, founders of Trikone and India Currents, are married in Toronto in traditional religious ceremony conducted by Ma Yogashakti, Arvind's mother.
- Books
  - Giti Thadani, Sakhiyani: Lesbian Desire in Ancient and Modern India.
  - Shani Mootoo, Cereus Blooms at Night.
  - The Invisibles: A Tale of Eunuchs of India by Zia Jaffrey
- Films:
  - BomGay, based on R. Raj Rao's poems, by Riyad Wadia
  - A Mermaid Called Aida by Riyad Wadia
  - Fire by Deepa Mehta

1997

- Naz Foundation (India) Trust starts helplines – Sangini for women and Humraz for men
- (India) Humrahi formally starts in Delhi
- (India) Darpan newsletter launched in Delhi
- Mahila Samanwaya Committee for sex workers in Calcutta opens membership to male sex workers
- (Bangladesh) Bandhu Social Welfare Society established in Dhaka to work on HIV/AIDS and the MSM community
- Counsel Club organizes Network East conference (Jan)
- (India) Copies of Trikone seized by Indian customs on grounds of morality (Aug)
- (United States) Javid Syed, AIDS activist included in best and brightest activists under 30 by The Advocate magazine (Aug)
- (India) Sabrang – a mixed group forms in Bangalore (Sep)
- (United States) Queer Awaaz formed in Los Angeles, later disbanded and merged with Trikone LA (Nov)
- (United States) Trikone LA was formed by approximately 30 people (RBC)
- (United States) Trikone-Northwest formed
- (India) National Seminar on Gay Rights organized by students of National Law School in Bangalore (Sep)
- (India) Meeting for Women who love Women is part of VIth National Conference of Women's Movements, Ranchi (Dec)
- Books:
  - Sex, Longing and Not Belonging – A Gay Muslim's Quest for Love and Meaning by Badruddin Khan
- Films:
  - Tamanna by Paresh Rawal about the life of a hijra
  - Darmiyaan: In Between by Kalpana Lajmi
  - Sixth Happiness by Waris Hussein

1998

- Al-Fatiha Foundation, an organization for LGBTQ Muslims worldwide, is founded by Faisal Alam, a Pakistani American.
- (Canada) Khushnet.com, a Canadian queer South Asian website, launched (featuring personal ads section named "Nobody knows I met my boyfriend through Khushnet's personals")
- (India) Sarani experimental group stages Coming Out with Music in Calcutta (Apr)
- (India) Sangha Mitra newsletter in Kannada and English published in Bangalore (Feb)
- (United States) First International Retreat of LGBT Muslims in Boston (Oct)
- DESIDYKES created
- (India) Gay Bombay (internet group) formed
- (India) GHAR (Gay Housing Assistance Resource) mailing lists start, eventually covering Mumbai, Kolkata, Chennai, Delhi, Bangalore, Canada, and the United States
- "Funkasia" South Asian club and cultural night started in Toronto, Canada
- (India) First public performance of Chetan Datar's Marathi-language play Ek Madhav Baug at the Humsafar Trust in Mumbai
- Books
  - Cinnamon Gardens – a novel by Shyam Selvadurai
  - Neither Man nor Woman: The Hijras of India by Serena Nanda
  - On A Muggy Night in Mumbai – play by Mahesh Dattani explores gay life. "On a Muggy Night in Mumbai" performed in Mumbai
- Films
  - Fire released in India and theaters are vandalized (Nov-Dec)
- Plays:

1998: First public reading of Ash Kotak's play Hijra at the Riverside Studios, London

1999

- (India) Aanchal Trust forms in Bombay with helpline for women (Aug)
- Women's Support Group founded in Sri Lanka
- Campaign for Lesbian Rights launched in India partly as a response to the violent demonstrations against Fire (Jan)
- (India) Fire re-cleared by Central Board of Film Censors (Feb)
- Fire released in India
- (India) Yaarian, national gay conference in Hyderabad (Feb)
- Al-Fatiha hosts first national conference for LGBT Muslims (May)
- (United States) Trikone wins New California Media award (May)
- (India) Sappho forms in Calcutta for lesbian and bi women (Jun)
- (India) Sangama started in Bangalore
- (India) The White Party (a gay party) in Bombay raided by police (Jun)
- (India) Counsel Club and Integration organizes Friendship Walk in Calcutta (Jul)
- Khamosh!Emergency Jari Hai/ Lesbian Emergence published by Campaign for Lesbian Rights in India (Aug)
- LGBT India conducts Operation Sparsh to educate political parties on sexual minority rights (Sep)
- (India) Olava (Organized Lesbian Alliance for Visibility and Acceptance) forms in Pune (Nov)
- Films:
  - Chutney Popcorn by Nisha Ganatra
- Books
  - First edition of "Humjinsi: Resource book on Lesbian, Gay and Bisexual Rights in India" published (Feb)
  - Love in a Different Climate: Men who have Sex with Men in India by Jeremy Seabrook
  - Facing the Mirror – lesbian writing from India for Penguin India edited by Ashwini Sukhtankar
  - Yaraana – anthology of gay writing for Penguin India edited by Hoshang Merchant
  - The Splintered Day – a novel by V.K. Mina

== 2000s ==
2000

- (India) Delhi hosts its first officially "out" lesbian and gay film festival (Jan)
- (India) Gay Bombay has meeting with parents (Feb)
- / (United States) SAATHII founded in Chennai and New York as an NGO working on concerted response to HIV/AIDS epidemic in India
- QueerIISc, the first college/university campus queer group in India, founded at the Indian Institute of Science, Bangalore
- (India) Shaleen Rakesh starts regular gay column in Around Town magazine in New Delhi (Feb)
- 172nd Law Commission Report of the Law Commission of India recommends deletion of Section 377 (Mar)
- Women's Support Group in Sri Lanka marches on International Women's Day (Mar)
- (India) Shabnam Mausi, a hijra, wins election in Madhya Pradesh to state assembly (Mar)
- (India) Humsafar Trust organizes Looking into the Next Millenium conference in Mumbai (May)
- (United States) Surina Khan appointed executive director of the International Gay and Lesbian Human Rights Commission (May)
- (Sri Lanka) Sri Lankan Press Council supports Island newspaper which said rapists should be unleashed on lesbians (Jun)
- (United States) Trikone organizes DesiQ2000 conference in San Francisco (Jun)
- Poet Ifti Nasim receives Adeeb International Award (Jul)
- (United Kingdom) Ash Kotak's play Hijra staged at the Theatre Royal Plymouth (Oct) and to rave reviews at the Bush Theatre in London (Nov)
- National Human Rights Commission in India recommend reformulating Section 377 to legalize sexual activity between consenting adults (Nov)
- (United States) National Alliance of South Asian Lambda Organization (NASALO) listserv created to support LGBT South Asian organizations and leaders across the U.S.
- (United States) Journal of Homosexuality's issue on queer Asian cinema includes several articles on Indian cinema
- (United States) DesiQ 2000 conference in San Francisco
- (United States) Ruth Vanita and Mona Bachmann marry in a Jewish and Hindu wedding ceremony in New York, the first such documented wedding in the U.S.
- (United States) Al-Fatiha Foundation, LGBT Muslim conference (US)
- LGBT India conducts Operation Sparsh to educate political parties on sexual minority rights
- (United States) "Gay Desi SF Bay" mailing list for San Francisco Bay Area queer desis started by Rakesh Modi
- Books:
  - Same Sex Love in India – Readings from Literature and History by Ruth Vanita and Saleem Kidwai
  - Humjinsi, a resource book for LGB rights published (India). Also includes papers presented at a seminar in Mumbai (1997)
- Films:
  - Bombay Eunuchs, directors Alexandra Shiva, Sean McDonald and Michelle Gucovsky

2001

- Blue Diamond Society, Nepal's only organization for sexual minorities founded
- (India) Lakshyaa – first Gujarati gay magazine comes out
- (Canada) Dosti group launches in Toronto (Sep)
- (Sri Lanka) Companions on a Journey and Women's Support Group win Felipa DeSouza award from IGLHRC (May)
- Delhi hosts India's first public gay wedding for Vijay and Naseem (May)
- Milan Project (Naz India) files case with National Human Rights Commission against psychiatric abuse of a homosexual patient subjected to aversion therapy (May)
- (United States) Trikone magazine wins South Asian Journalists Association award for "South Asian Queers Out on the Internet" article (Jun)
- (India) Four activists of Naz Foundation International arrested in Lucknow under Section 377 in "gay area", Naz and Bharosa offices raided (Jul)
- (United States) QFilmistan – first Queer South Asian film festival
- (United States) The Advocate magazine names Faisal Alam, founder of Al Fatiha Foundation as a queer trend breaker (Aug)
- (United States) Trikone organizes first ever QFilmistan film festival in San Francisco (Aug-Sep)
- Naz Foundation (India) Trust awarded 2001 Commonwealth Award for Action on HIV/AIDS (Oct)
- (India) Naz Foundation files petition in Delhi High Court challenging constitutional validity of Section 377 (Dec)
- (United States) Poet Agha Shahid Ali dies of brain cancer (Dec)
- (Canada) Chilling in Your Brown Skin Collective launched (Toronto)
- Gay and Lesbian Vaishnava Association
- Gay Bombay has meeting with parents (India)
- Films:
  - Bombay Eunuch
  - For Straights Only by Vismita Gupta-Smith
  - (Canada) Rewriting the Script: A Love Letter to Our Families (Toronto)
- Books:
  - Queering India edited by Ruth Vanita

2002

- (India) Police harassment of Sangama organization in Bangalore
- (India) Ashok Pillai, president of Indian Network of People Living with HIV/AIDS passes away (Apr)
- (United States) Vega and Mala are married by Hindu Shaiva pundit in Seattle, WA (Jun)
- (United States) Sholay Productions in New York launches Desilicious parties
- (India) Hijra Habba festival organized in Bangalore
- (India) Lovers Geethalakshmi and Sumathi die by suicide in Tamil Nadu (Sep)
- First ILGA summit in India organized by Humsafar Trust and Aanchal (Oct)
- (United States) Trikone magazine wins South Asian Journalists Association award for "Queer Muslims: De-closeted"
- (India) Thrissur, the court gave permission to two lesbian women to cohabit
- (India) Sahayatrika group set up in Thiruvananthapuram, Kerala to tackle increasing lesbian suicides (Oct)
- (India) (France) First legal same-sex union on Indian soil with Indian fashion designer Wendell Rodricks, a Goan Catholic, and Jerome Marrell conducted at French Embassy under French law.
- (India) Delhi hosts first public gay wedding
- Films
  - Flying With One Wing – a film by Ashok Handagama about a woman who lives as a man released in Sri Lanka
  - Mango Soufflé, film version of Muggy Night directed by Mahesh Dattani
  - Gulabi Aina, a drag queen movie by Sridhar Rangayan
  - Kaashish by Sangini
  - For Straights Only
- Books:
  - (United States) Ode to Lata, a novel by Ghalib Shiraz Dhalla
  - The Man who Was a Woman and Other Queer Tales from Hindu Lore by Devdutt Pattanaik

2003

- Nepal hosts first drag beauty contest (May)
- (Nepal) Black and White – 1st GLBT AIDS charity event in Colombo (Jun)
- (India) Rainbow Walk – Gay Pride march in Kolkata (Jun)
- Openly gay painter Bhupen Khakkar passes away (Aug)
- (United States) QFilmistan – the sequel in San Francisco (Aug)
- Nepal's Blue Diamond Society hosts Gaijatra Pride festival (Aug)
- (United States) Openly lesbian Kaashish Chopra wins Miss Congeniality at Miss India USA (Aug)
- (India) Sappho for Equality forms in Calcutta by the core founders of Sappho
- (India) Larzish, 1st International Film Festival of Sexuality and Gender Plurality in Mumbai (Aug)
- (India) Shree Nandu, 24, and Sheela, 22, declared themselves same-sex spouses
- (India) Filmmaker Riyad Wadia passes away in Mumbai (Dec)
- (United States) Rustam Kothavala (from Bangalore) and Toby Marotta marry under Vermont's civil union law.
- (United States) US Supreme Court decriminalizes sodomy in Lawrence v. Texas
- Movenpick/Orinam, social support group for LGBT&A started in Chennai, India
- Books
  - The Trouble with Islam by Irshad Manji results in death threats
  - The Boyfriend, a novel by R. Raj Rao
  - (United States) Desilicious by the Masala Trois Collective
  - (United Kingdom) Red Threads by Parminder Sekhon and Poulomi Desai photographic portraits published by Diva and Millvres

2004

- (India) Humsafar opens first Indian gay and lesbian drop-in center opens in Mumbai (Apr)
- (Canada) Mirchi group begins for queer women, hosted at the Alliance for South Asian AIDS Prevention
- Rosanna Flamer-Caldera re-elected as Co-Secretary General of the International Lesbian and Gay Association (Apr)
- (United States) Mala (Vaijayanthi Nagarajan) and Vega (Vegavahini Subramaniam) participate as plaintiffs in the marriage equality lawsuit against King County and Washington (March)
- (United States) Gita Deane (Indian-born) and Lisa Polyak become the lead plaintiff couple in the marriage equality lawsuit against Maryland.
- (Nepal) Equal Ground – an LGBTIQ organization forms in Sri Lanka (Jun)
- (Nepal) First Colombo Pride in Sri Lanka
- Theaters vandalized in India over screening of Girlfriends (Aug)
- (India) Hijra activist Famila dies in Bangalore (Aug)
- (India) Pushkin Chandra and Kuldeep, gay men, killed in Delhi. (Aug)
- 39 gays arrested in Nepal on grounds of "disturbing society" (Aug).
- Delhi High Court dismisses Naz India's public interest litigation petition seeking repeal of Section 377 (Sep)
- (United States) Khush Texas was founded in Dallas
- Films:
  - The Journey by Ligy Pullapally
  - Touch of Pink by Ian Iqbal Rashid
  - Yours Emotionally by Sridhar Rangayan
  - The Bath by Sachin Kundalkar
  - Happy Hookers by Ashish Sawhney
  - Many People Many Desires by Jayashree T.
- Books:
  - Madras on Rainy Days by Samina Ali
  - Babyji by Abha Dawesar
  - Beyond Bollywood: Cultural Politics of South Asian Diasporic Film by Jigna Desai

2005

- Blue Diamond Society in Nepal launches weekly newspaper (Jan)
- Blue Diamond Society, Nepal, wins 2004 Utopia Award (Jan)
- Onir's award-winning film My Brother Nikhil about a gay swimmer and AIDS releases in India (Mar)
- Ismail Merchant passes away (May)
- (United States) South Asian parent marches in Seattle Pride Parade with Trikone-NW
- (Sri Lanka) 1st Sri Lankan Pride Celebration in Colombo
- (India) "Pokkhiraj" (The Pegasus) gay music video by Bangla band Cactus airs on TV (Jul)
- (India) Protesters march in Mumbai against Section 377 (Aug)
- Purported "first" same-sex marriage in Pakistan between Liaqat Ali and Markeen in Khyber region (Oct)
- (United States) Satrang (Los Angeles) gets its first grant (LAIFC)
- (Canada) Trikone Vancouver begins (Jul)
- Vikram Seth comes out
- Books:
  - Because I Have a Voice – Queer Politics in India edited by Arvind Narrain and Gautam Bhan
  - Love's Rite – Same-Sex Marriage in India and the West by Ruth Vanita
  - Impossible Desires – Queer Diasporas and South Asian Public Cultures by Gayatri Gopinath
  - (Canada) / (Sri Lanka) Swimming in the Monsoon Sea by Shyam Selvadurai
- Films:
  - (India) My Brother Nikhil by Onir
  - Shabnam Mousi by Yogesh Bhardwaj
  - Yours Emotionally!

2006

- (India) Four men arrested in Lucknow for operating an Internet "gay racket" and "unnatural sex" (Jan)
- Rosanna Flamer-Caldera of Sri Lanka wins 2005 Utopia Award (Jan)
- (India) Men Community Development Society for homosexuals formed in Chennai (Mar)
- NACO estimates 5.2 million people ages 15–49 living in India with HIV/AIDS (Apr)
- (India) The Dalai Lama expresses concern at violence against LGBT people and urges human rights for all (Apr)
- Abha Dawesar's Babyji wins Stonewall Award
- (United States) DesiQ 2006 conference in San Francisco
- (India) Flora Fountain Mumbai Anti-377 protest
- (Canada) Michi group for queer women begins (Toronto)
- (India) Queer Resource website Orinam.net website launched (need resource)

2007

- Supreme Court of Nepal orders government to support LGBT equality
- (Nepal) Blue Diamond Society wins Felipa DeSouza award from IGLHRC
- (United States) Parents of two Indian gay persons march in SF Gay Parade
- (United States) Khush DC Queer Women's History Month event launched (happens annually since)
- (United States) SATRANG release their Needs Assessment Report
- (United States) First Coming Out Day Parade in Little India in Artesia, California, USA
- Book:
  - Stealing Nasreen by Farzana Doctor
- Film
  - (India) 68 Pages directed by Sridhar Rangayan

2008

- (Nepal) Sunil Pant elected to Nepali Constitutional Assembly (first openly elected queer person) (Apr)
- (Nepal) Nepali government starts to allocate national budget for LGBTQ
- (United States) First US national study of LGBTQ South Asians in Higher Education conducted by Raja Bhattar and Pamela Roy
- (United States) Trikone launches first political campaign, "No On Prop 8", against California's same sex marriage ban referendum
- (Canada) Sher Vancouver formed
- (United States) South Asian serves as one of 3 co-directors for National Queer Asian Pacific Islander Alliance (NQAPIA)
- (United States) Sivagami "Shiva" Subbaraman, first S. Asian to become Director of an LGBTQ Center in US higher education; and Founding Director of the first LGBTQ Center in a Catholic & Jesuit University in the US (Georgetown U).
- (United States) Trikone Magazine published in color
- (United States) Trikone Chicago begins
- Seksualiti Merdeka, an annual sexuality rights festival held in Kuala Lumpur, Malaysia founded by arts programmer Pang Khee Teik and singer-songwriter Jerome Kugan.
- (United States) D'Lo leads first queer South Asian writing workshop in Los Angeles
- (United States) Prerna Lal becomes active in Dream Activist movement.

2009

- Keengar Society – Youth Secular Organization for Protection of Religious and Sexual Minorities registered in Pakistan
- Pakistan's Supreme Court declares third gender for trans/hijra population; orders all state organizations to protect them equally under the law
- (India) Chennai's first Rainbow Pride March (Jun)
- (India) Section 377 read down by Delhi High Court to exclude all consensual sex among adults
- (India) Campaign for Open Minds launched.

== 2010s ==
2010

- (India) KASHISH Mumbai International Queer Film Festival founded
- (India) Yaariyan group for LGBT youth founded in Mumbai by the Humsafar Trust (Dec)
- (United States) Khush Berkeley ("a safe space for queer and questioning Desis") group founded at the University of California, Berkeley by Fayzan, Nevin, and Preyanka
- (United States) SALGA is readmitted into NYC India Day Parade after being denied or dismissed for nearly 10 years.
- Humsafar Trust premieres Hindu translation of Chetan Datar's play Ek Madhav Baug at Mumbai Queer Film Festival, before taking the play on the road across India and the United States
- Book:
  - (Canada) God Loves Hair by Vivek Shraya
- Films:
  - (Canada) Brown Like Me (Toronto)
  - (India) Arekti Premer Golpo, a Bengali drama directed by Bengali filmmaker Kaushik Ganguly
  - (India) Memories in March, a Hindi and English language drama directed by Sanjoy Nag

2011

- Srishti Madurai formed on 2 September as India's first student volunteer LGBTQIA educational research foundation
- (United States) Kulture Kulcha: Trikone's 25th Anniversary
- (United States) Gautam Raghavan becomes the first Indian LGBT Liaison in the White House Office of Public Engagement
- (India) Hijras get right to vote by Supreme Court
- Saathi (IIT-Bombay): possibly India's first campus-based LGBT group
- Naz Male Health Alliance (the first MSM/TG based CBO) established in Pakistan
- (United States) Satrang youth group begins in Los Angeles (Oct)
- (Canada) brOWN//out, new "south asian" queer and trans program at Pride Toronto starts (annual)
- (India) "gay_bombay" yahoo group formed, different from "gaybombay" one
- Films:
  - Project Bolo-Indian LGBT Oral History Project

2012

- (India) Asia's first Genderqueer pride parade and Alan Turing centenary celebrations commenced at Madurai in July 2012
- (India) 2 July 2012 has been celebrated as the first Indian Coming Out Day to mark the 2009 Naz Foundation v. Govt. of NCT of Delhi judgement that decriminalisaed homosexual sexual activity.
- (United States) KhushATX formed.
- (India) First LGBT Education Fest for School Students launched by Srishti Madurai at Madurai on 5 June 2012. It was attended by 600 school students.
- (India) Gopi Shankar Madurai of Srishti Madurai became the youngest panelist to share a chair at the University Grants Commission's sponsored seminars on gender and sexuality that have been taking place all over Tamil Nadu since 2012–2014.
- Nepal hosts South Asia's first gay sports tournament
- (Pakistan) Several Pakistani hijra leaders run for national and provincial assembly seats in elections (e.g. Bindiya Rana of Gender Interactive Alliance)
- (United States) Desi Queer Helpline (DeQH) officially launched (national US-based service)
- (United States) NQAPIA hosts conference in DC. Many South Asian LGBTQ organizations represent and visit the White House
- Seksualiti Merdeka Bammeo in Malaysia
- (Canada) Queer Diwali event in Toronto (Nov)
- Film:
  - (India) Chitrangada: The Crowning Wish by Rituparno Ghosh

2013

- (India) In January 2013 The American College in Madurai under graduation English department included Funny Boy by Shyam Selvadurai as part of syllabus under gay literature and ‘The Truth about me: A Hijra Life story' by A. Revathi under Third Gender literature marginalized studies. Due to the efforts of Srishti Madurai.
- (India) In June 2013 Harish Iyer became the first Indian citizen to be listed in the Guardian's World Pride Powerlist, a list of the 100 most influential LGBTIQ people in the world
- (United States) DesiQ Conference, fourth International South Asian Queer Conference
- (United States) DOMA declared unconstitutional and Prop 8 goes down
- Srishti Madurai launched India's first helpline for Genderqueer, LGBTQIA on 2 October 2011, at Madurai. Later in June 2013 the helpline turned to offer service for 24 hours with a tagline "Just having someone understanding to talk to can save a life".
- (United Kingdom) British Asian LGBTI Online Support Group Founded by Siddhi Joshi on 27 September 2013
- Supreme Court of Nepal ruling for the introduction of a transgender category for people obtaining their citizenship certificates. People can register as a third gender when completing the certificates which serve as national identity cards required to open bank accounts, sell and buy property, and get a passport.
- On 11 December 2013, Supreme Court of India reinstates Section 377 of the Indian Penal Code, overruling the 2009 Delhi High Court Judgement
- (United States) First Khush DC women's membership meeting
- First high-school LGBTQIA alliance in India: Breaking Barriers at Tagore International, New Delhi
- "You and I" campaign for trans people and allies starts in Malaysia
- (Canada) Trikone Toronto launches
- (Malaysia) A state-sponsored anti-LGBT musical tours Malaysian schools and theaters
- Books
  - (Canada) Q?Y Art? book/art compilation released, based on multidisciplinary arts program for South Asian LGBTTIQQ2S/WSW/MSM youth (Toronto).

2014

- Launch of Roopbaan, the first LGBT magazine in Bangladesh
- (India) First Indian LGBT Youth Leadership Summit held in Mumbai (Feb)
- (India) In July 2014 first book on genderqueer in Tamil and first Tamil book on LGBTQIA from Srishti Madurai was released by BJP's state general secretary Vanathi Srinivasan at the Hindu spiritual service foundation's sixth service fair, Chennai
- (United Kingdom) British born gay doctor, Dr Nazim Mahmood, takes his own life after being confronted about his sexuality by his family, leading the launch of the charity Naz and Matt Foundation
- Supreme Court of India rules in the NALSA vs. Union of India case, declaring that transgender people have all rights granted by the Indian constitution, the right to determine their gender (man, woman, third-gender) regardless of surgery, hormones or attire
- (India) In October 2014, a month long celebrations commenced to celebrate LGBT History Month at The American College with a lecture on gender and sexual minorities organised by Srishti Madurai.
- (United States) Aaditi Hardikar named first woman of color as White House LGBT Liaison
- Books
  - (India) Maraikappata Pakkangal (Hidden Pages) is the first book on LGBTQIA & Gendervariants in Tamil penned by Gopi Shankar Madurai of Srishti Madurai.

2015

- Madhu Kinnar, India's first transgender mayor and a member of the Dalit community, elected as mayor of Raigarh, Chhattisgarh (Jan)
- India's Rajya Sabha passes the Rights of Transgender Persons Bill, 2014, paving the way for a potential future law (Apr)
- Manabi Bandyopadhyay celebrated as India's first openly transgender college principal (May)
- First ad featuring two lesbians in India
- (India) Dalit queer activists Dhrubo Jyoti, Akhil Khang, and Dhiren Borisa speak out at Delhi Pride Parade (Nov)
- Nepal issues its first "third-gender" passport
- Nepal explicitly puts equal rights and freedom from discrimination for LGBT individuals in the constitution
- (India) Jawaharlal Nehru University, New Delhi, started offering "Others" option in the gender column of the application form. Due to the efforts of Gopi Shankar Madurai of Srishti Madurai and the student community at JNU.
- (India) Srishti Madurai urged Lok Sabha MP's to include intersex people in a bill to protect the rights of trans people.
- Books
  - (United States) Don't Let Him Know by Sandip Roy
  - (United States) Moving Truth(s): Queer and Transgender Desi Writings on Family, an anthology of writing by queer and transgender Desis about family, edited by Aparajeeta Duttchoudhury and Rukie Hartman
- Film
  - (India) The film Naanu Avanalla...Avalu, about the life of Living Smile Vidya, won two awards at the 62nd National Film Awards
  - First ever movie on Pakistan's hidden LGBT community: Poshida: Hidden LGBT Pakistan

2016

- (United States) Nergis Mavalvala, a queer Pakistani American MIT astrophysicist, was part of the team of scientists who observed gravitational waves for the first time
- (India) On 6 March 2016, Srishti Madurai's new website was launched by Dalit activist and Ambedkarite Ma. Venkatesan from BJP in the presence of Central Minister Pon Radhakrishnan, Vanathi Srinivasan, Aravindan Neelakandan, Joe D'Cruz and scores of Rashtriya Swayamsevak Sangh volunteers at Chennai.
- (India) Gopi Shankar Madurai, a 25-year-old gender activist, made a bid to contest as one of the youngest candidates in the Tamil Nadu Assembly election and also the first openly Intersex & Genderqueer person to do so. Ze secured 14th place out of 21 candidates by securing 1% vote.
- Xulhaz Mannan and Tanay Fahim murdered in Dhaka, Bangladesh
- On 15 July 15, for the first time Srishti Madurai along with Tamil Nadu Theological Seminary in Madurai a conglomerate of the Church of South India (CSI), and the Lutheran Church organised an Introductory seminar for church pastors on LGBT issues.
- (India) Gopi Shankar Madurai of Srishti Madurai shortlisted for The Commonwealth Youth Worker Award as regional finalist for Asia.
- The Supreme Court of Sri Lanka states it would be unable to enforce Article 365 that criminalizes homosexual sex, but the law is left dormant on the books due to lack of judicial review powers.

2017

- Pakistan issues first passport with transgender category.
- (India) Indian Supreme Court declares privacy is an intrinsic right, and that sexual orientation is an essential attribute of privacy.

2018

- (United Kingdom) First South Asian LGBTI Conference held at Queen Elizabeth Hospital Birmingham, organised by British Asian LGBTI, Finding A Voice and Gaysian Faces on 28 July 2018, with eighteen speakers, two films (Sisak and Planchette)
- Indian Supreme Court legalizes gay sex and reads down Section 377 of the Indian Penal Code, which criminalized same-sex relations. India's Outgoing chief justice Dipak Misra, regarding the ruling, said: "Criminalising carnal intercourse is irrational, arbitrary and manifestly unconstitutional."
- (United Kingdom) First Indian LGBTQIA Network in the UK, GIN (Gay Indian Network) founded by Mayank Joshi. First "GIN & Bombay Tonic" meeting in Soho on 30 September 2018.

2019

- (United States) Parivar Bay Area, a South Asian transgender and gender non-conforming centered organization, launched in the San Francisco Bay Area

== 2020s ==
2020

- (United States) DesiQ Diaspora conference planned in Austin, Texas, but postponed until 2022 due to COVID-19 pandemic (May)
- (India) Indian Desi drag space Dragvanti was launched by Patruni Sastry
- (United Kingdom) Indian & South Asian LGBTQ social and support group set up in Birmingham, GIN Midlands, by the GIN Indian LGBTQIA Network UK. on 4 September 2020.

2021

- (India) Indian's First ever Drag conference was organized virtually by Dragvanti to promote academic discussion on Indian drag
- the first All India Queer Mobilization conclave was organised by Mobbera Foundation online where more than 25 Queer rights organizations participated to discuss Reformation plan for queer rights within each Indian state.
- (United Kingdom) Indian & South Asian Lesbian social and support group, GIN & Lime setup in UK by Sophie Cannivady, Sejal Patel and GIN Indian LGBTQ Network UK. on 18 February 2021.

2022

- (United Kingdom) Anish Pathak and Mayank Joshi set up Next GINeration; a social and support group for younger Indian & South Asian LGBTQ people in the UK, on 5 January 2022. Sponsored by GIN Indian LGBTQIA Network UK.
- (United States) Legendary activist Urvashi Vaid dies (May)

2023

- The Supreme Court of India merges all current lower court cases regarding same-sex marriage from across India. The combined case, Supriyo v. Union of India, is heard by a five-member bench of the court. In October, the court rules against the plaintiffs, ruling that the legalization of same-sex marriage, civil unions and adoption is a question for the Parliament and state legislatures of India.
- (United Kingdom) One of the most prominent Sikh voices in British public life, Jasvir Singh talks to the BBC about being a gay Sikh man married to his husband and the challenges faced along the way

2026

- In the 2026 Rajya Sabha elections, lawyer Menaka Guruswamy became India's first openly LGBTQ+ national-level member of Parliament, elected on behalf of the Trinamool Congress.

== Books ==
- ASIAN GAY LITERATURE, 3rd ed. (2024, March) (193-page digital list of novels, poetry, short stories, autobiographies, etc. Includes many works from India, Sri Lanka, Pakistan, and other countries across Asia)

== See also ==
- Timeline of Asian and Pacific Islander Diasporic LGBT History
- Timeline of African and diasporic LGBT history
