= ABVA =

ABVA may refer to:

- AIDS Bhedbhav Virodhi Andolan, an Indian AIDS and LGBT rights organization
- General Union of Civil Servants (Algemene Bond van Ambtenaren, ABVA), a Dutch trade union, now Abvakabo
