= Sarita Sarvate =

Indian-American journalist and writer

Sarita Sarvate is an Indian-American journalist and writer. For nearly twenty-five years, she published the “Last Word” column for India Currents, an Indian-American magazine. She has also published opinion essays for New America Media, a coalition of ethnic media around the world and its predecessor the Pacific News Service, for over a decade. Her opinion columns, essays, and book reviews have been syndicated in the Los Angeles Times, the San Jose Mercury News, the Oakland Tribune, Salon Magazine, Rediff News Service of India, and many other online and print media outlets. Her commentaries have aired on the National Public Radio (NPR) and its San Francisco Bay Area affiliate, KQED FM. She has been a leader in the South Asian community, speaking at various events, and has been written about in a profile of exceptional women in the South Asian immigrant women. Her fiction has been published in the Chabot Review, Weavers Literary Review, and Living in America, an anthology of poetry and fiction by South Asian American writers.

== Awards ==
In 1998, she won the award for the best commentary in ethnic media from New California Media, a coalition of ethnic digital and print media that has since expanded to become the New America Media. The following year, she won the second prize in the same category. Her columns have also won awards from the San Francisco Press Club in three consecutive years, 2019, 2020, and 2021.

== Memoir ==
Midnight's Daughter, her memoir, is being published by Vine Leaves Press on September 22, 2026.

On the Republic Day of India in 1960, the young author gives a speech at her middle school. Her family is progressive; her mother studies for her BA while her father encourages her to be free, reciting Jawaharlal Nehru's speech at India’s independence from Britain: At the stroke of the midnight hour, when the world sleeps, India will awake to life and freedom. But as Aruna enters high school, her mother suffers a nervous breakdown. Aruna takes on the parental role even as she excels in her studies. Succumbing to societal pressure, she enters a disastrous arranged marriage but soon escapes to graduate school in Berkeley, endures the stigma of divorce, and falls in love with an Englishman who lives in New Zealand. Will Aruna live happily ever after? As the author navigates her way across the oceans, she offers a meditation on racism and colonialism, reproduction and motherhood, and the patriarchal roots of her mother’s mental illness. Like the freedom fighter she was named after, she discovers her voice and the courage to reclaim her identity, delivering a deeply moving narrative of resilience, love, and self-discovery.
