= Khush: South Asian Lesbian and Gay Association =

Khush: South Asian Lesbian and Gay Association (Khush meaning "happy") was a queer collective activist organization in Canada geared towards South Asian men and women whose goal was to promote a better understanding of South Asian culture and values within the gay and lesbian community.

The organization operated from 1987 and 1998, and had an active web presence since the early 1990s. As asserted by Sandip Roy, "Khush constructed a "safe space" for both Indian gay men and lesbians online, during a time when offline or in-person contact between Indian queers for nonsexual purposes was deemed largely unimaginable.”

Khush also sought to address the "othering" and exclusion of queer South Asians within scholarly work and the media, in terms of access, contacts, racism, etc.

== History ==
=== 1987 ===
- South Asian Gay Association (SAGA) founded by two South Asian gay men, one of whom was Prabha Khosla.
- Membership expanded, and included both men and women.
- Monthly group meetings started.
- The group's name was subsequently changed to Khush.

=== 1988 ===
- A two-day, out of town, brainstorming session was held to articulate goals and set up the administrative structure.
- Khush, along with Gay Asians of Toronto, coordinated "Unity Among Asians", the first Asian gay and lesbian conference to be held in North America. The creation of ALOT, Asian Lesbians of Toronto, was a direct outcome of this event.
- A grant was awarded by the Lesbian and Gay Community Appeal to help with outreach efforts.
- Khush established a basic infrastructure to ensure increased public accessibility: the name was registered as an organization, a telephone line was installed, and a post office box address was obtained.

=== 1989 ===
- "Khush Khayal" was founded; the first South Asian gay newsletter in Canada. The newsletter was volunteer-driven with both national and international distribution. A monthly community calendar of events, "Chhota Khayal" was also produced, but discontinued in 1993.
- Khush members volunteered to help raise funds for the Lesbian and Gay Community Appeal. This effort has continued since then.
- Organized an evening of food and mujra dance as part of a major fund-raising drive for the Euclid Theatre. Raised $500 to buy a seat. The Euclid Theatre later became the primary venue for Desh Pardesh.
- Khush organized "Salaam! Toronto", a program celebrating diasporic South Asian, gay and lesbian cultures and identities. It was held at the 519 Church Street Community Centre. The event drew more than 600 people of all ages, colors and sexualities. The program consisted of classical folk dances, readings, a "creative restaurant", table displays and more.
- Khush was a founding party of SAIN (South Asian Interagency Network), later renamed CASSA (Coalition of Agencies Serving South Asians). SAIN/CASSA was an advocacy group aimed at improving social service delivery among South Asians in metropolitan Toronto. Several Khush members have served on the Board of Directors of CASSA since then.
- Khush founded SAAC (South Asian AIDS Coalition) in partnership with South Asian Lesbians, later renamed ASAP (Alliance for South Asian AIDS Prevention). It was the first initiative in Canada to address HIV/AIDS issues in South Asian communities. Several Khush members have served on the Board of Directors of ASAP since then.

=== 1990 ===
- Based on the success of "Salaam! Toronto", the first "Desh Pardesh" was organized and became an annual festival dedicated to exploring the art, culture and politics of diasporic South Asians living in the West.

=== 1991 ===
- Khush sponsored the second Desh Pardesh consisting of a five-day, expanded program.

=== 1993 ===
- Khush sponsored and organized the first ever International South Asian Gay Men's Conference, "Discovery ‘93". The three-day event covered a wide range of issues and attracted people from around the world. The conference also drew important media coverage (including articles in XTRA!, Star India, India Abroad, NOW Magazine, India Currents and the Toronto Star). It increased Khush's public visibility and further encouraged South Asian gay men to seek support and affirmation from Khush.
- Khush members in collaboration with CASSA (Coalition of Agencies Serving South Asians), founded "Ahimsa" (meaning 'compassion'), an organization that advocated for South Asian Men Against Violence (against women and children).

=== 1994 ===
- Khush members organized "Loving Colours", a community conversation about lesbian and gay relationships, attended by South Asian lesbian, bisexual and gay writers, as well as a report on HIV/AIDS in South Asia. The event was held at the 519 and was attended by more than 60 people of diverse backgrounds.
- As part of the Khush media-outreach strategy, South Asian Newsweek featured a 20-minute segment profiling South Asian lesbian and gay lifestyles and issues.

== Initiatives ==
=== Chhota Khayal ===
Chhota Khayal was a newsletter similar to Khush Khayal, but was in circulation for only two years. It was published three times a year, from 1992 to 1994.

=== Desh Pardesh ===
Desh Pardesh (meaning "home away from home") was a "multidisciplinary arts festival functioning as a venue for underrepresented and marginalized groups within the South Asian diasporic community of Toronto". It was a queer positive, feminist, antiracist, anti-imperialist, and anti-caste organization that operated from 1989 to 2001, and was sponsored by Khush.

The festival was funded by academic institutions, media and film boards, and government-sponsored grants for lesbian and gay organizations.

Desh Pardesh closed down as a result of a financial crisis in 2001.

Participants were encouraged to express themselves through writing, poetry, performing arts, film, photography, dancing, etc.

Desh Pardesh had four operating principles:

1. Desh Pardesh strives to forge links among local South Asian artists and cultural producers in Ontario as well as with their counterparts across Canada and throughout the West.
2. Desh Pardesh is lesbian and gay positive, feminist, anti-racist, anti-imperialist and anti caste/classist. Desh Pardesh exists to ensure that the voices and expressions of those constituencies in the South Asian community are provided with a community forum. In particular, independent artists, cultural producers and activists who are women, lesbians and gays, people with disabilities, working-class people, and seniors.
3. Desh Pardesh is a secular organization that recognizes the historical, geographical, linguistic, and religious diversity within the South Asian community. Desh is opposed to all forms of religious fundamentalism, communalism, and works to forward the voices of all cultural and linguistic groups in the South Asian context, namely South Asians in the diaspora.
4. Desh Pardesh works in concert with other communities, artists, and activists of colour with compatible objectives to make links between South Asian, First Nations and people of color cultures and communities.

Underlining Desh Pardesh was an intersectional approach within the politics of identity, race, sexuality, gender, class and ethnicity.

Panels were also held to address issues such as living with AIDS, anti-racist organizing, the experience of exile, South Asian lesbians and gays, working class politics and culture, religious fundamentalism, communalism, etc.

Desh Pardesh also published a quarterly zine of news, views, and reviews called Avec Pyar (meaning "with love"). Each issue was published during the following years:

- Issue 1 - 1990
- Issue 2 - 1992
- Issue 3 - 1993
- Issue 4 - 1994
- Issue 5 - 1995
- Issue 6 - 1996
- Issue 7 - 1997
- Issue 8 - 1998

=== Discovery '93: South Asian Gay Men's Conference ===
Discovery '93 was the first international conference for South Asian gay men held in 1993 by Khush to address issues such as gay bashing, racist harassment and job firings within both a Western and South Asian context.

The conference brought together participants from various organizations in Toronto, including the Alliance for South Asian AIDS Prevention and the AIDS Committee of Toronto, both of which provided some funding for the conference.

The conference involved a series of small, focused workshops as well as plenary sessions for sharing information among participants.

=== Khayal Entertainment Guide ===
The Khayal Entertainment Guide was a comprehensive compilation of South Asian TV and radio programming that was started by Khush in 1993 and distributed to both members and non-members.

=== Khush Khayal ===
Khush Khayal (Khush meaning "happy", and Khayal meaning a thought or opinion) was a quarterly publication, published from 1989 to 1994, that provided queer people of South Asian descent a medium for sharing thoughts and opinions within Canada.

The publication was intended to provide readers with a sense of what moves, interests, and affects the South Asian queer community. The goal was to promote understanding of South Asian culture and values within the overarching lesbian and gay South Asian communities.

Each volume was published during the following years:

- Volume 1 (4 Issues) – 1989
- Volume 2 (4 Issues) – 1990
- Volume 3 (4 Issues) – 1991–1992
- Volume 4 (4 Issues) – 1993
- Volume 5 (3 issues) - 1994

=== Khush Retreat ===
The Khush retreats were held as a forum to examine and discuss the goals and objectives of Khush for the prior and following years.

The first retreat was held from October 1 to 2 of 1988, at Skitch Cottage.

The second retreat was held from September 29 to October 1 of 1989, at Taoist Tai Chi Centre, in Orangeville.

=== Khush Rethink ===
Also known as Renewal Day, Khush Rethink was held on March 29, 1998.

The meeting was held to assess the need for Khush to exist, to prioritize certain needs, determine the organizational structure, services, time, skills, and money required to operate the organization.

At this meeting, it was decided that Khush would be shut down.

=== Salaam Toronto ===
Salaam Toronto was the name of a fair geared towards South Asian men and women, held from 1988 to 1993. It was formed and facilitated under Khush's direction.

The event encouraged South Asian dancers, writers, artists, and poets to express their work.

The goal of the event was to increase awareness about South Asian cultures within South Asian and queer communities. The event was also intended to foster a supportive environment in Toronto for South Asian lesbians and gays.

Multiple groups were invited to participate and set up, decorate, and staff their own tables. These groups included the South Asian Women's Group, the Riverdale Immigrant Women's Centre, Trikone, Montreal South Asians, Lavayna, Kashmir Gifts, Masrani's Rest, This Ain't the Rosedale Library, and Glad Day, among others.

== Activities ==
=== Grassroots: Fifth International Lesbian and Gay People of Colour Conference ===
Khush was invited to the 5th International Lesbian and Gay People of Colour Conference, the theme of which was "Grassroots", and was held in 1988.

The conference was structured around a series of workshops, panels and cultural programs that deal with issues that are important to lesbian and gay people of colour such as sex, AIDS, sexism, racism, classism, relationships, family, parenting, homophobia, taking care of the self and celebrating South Asian diversity and sexuality.

=== International Gay and Lesbian Human Rights Commission ===
Khush was invited to participate in the International Gay and Lesbian Human Rights Commission in 1992, which was formed to document, expose, and protest human rights and abuses against homosexual people worldwide.

The information provided by Khush was subsequently used:

- To put sexual orientation on the world human rights agenda
- To mobilize protests, both in the U.S. and internationally, against abuse
- To write reports documenting the international human rights situation for lesbians and gay men
- To refer cases to Amnesty International and other human rights organizations for international action
- To support people who sought political asylum in other nations due to persecution for their sexual orientation

=== Toronto Mayor's Committee on Community and Race Relations ===
Khush was invited to a meeting between lesbian and gay community organizations and members of the Toronto Mayor's Committee on Community and Race Relations.

The meeting was held on October 2, 1989, at the Toronto City Hall. Topics discussed included equal opportunity policies, an annual equality day, and pride day.

=== National Conference of Indian Activists ===
The National Conference of Indian Activists was held on May 23 to 24, 1992, and was intended to be a workshop to discuss important issues in relation to the South Asian queer community. These issues included the coming out process, visibility, political activism, racism, the AIDS crisis in India, and HIV and immigration issues in the U.S., among others.

=== The Naz Project ===
The Naz Project was founded in 1991 in London. It established itself in New Delhi, India, via an accompanying group called the Naz Foundation, in 1996.

The Naz Project established a charitable trust in India that aimed to provide help and resources in South Asia. Khush was asked to provide financial support for the organization.

Khush was also asked to attend a conference held from December 27 to 31, 1994. The conference was sponsored by The Naz Project and entitled "Emerging Gay Identities: Implications for HIV/AIDS and Sexual Health".

The objectives of the Naz Project were:

- To develop education and prevention programmes on sexual health
- To provide anonymous counselling and testing facilities
- To provide support programmes for those affected by HIV/AIDS
- To work in the arena of gender constructions, sexualities and sexual health

=== Pride ===
Khush attended Pride during the years of 1988, 1989, 1990, 1991, 1992, 1993, 1997, and 1998, until Khush disbanded.

=== South Asian Lesbian and Gay History Archiving Project (1994) ===
Khush became involved in The ArQuives: Canada's LGBTQ2+ Archives|South Asian Lesbian and Gay History Archiving Project in 1994, which documented the contribution of South Asian lesbians and gay men to the growth and development of the lesbian, gay, and South Asian communities in metropolitan Toronto.

=== Unity Among Asians Conference ===
Khush was invited to the Unity Among Asians Conference, which was held on August 19 to 21, 1988.

The conference was intended to provide participants with action plans to strengthen individual groups through networking and sharing personal experiences. Small workshops were facilitated to address issues such as self-esteem, racism, historic events, and identity, among others.

== Involvement ==
Khush has also been involved and associated with the following organizations:

- Ahimsa: South Asian Men Against Violence (1994)
- Alliance for South Asian AIDS Prevention (ASAP) (1991–1996)
- Asian Lesbians of Toronto (ALOT) (1988)
- Coalition of Agencies Serving South Asians (CASSA) (1991–1995)
- Coalition for Lesbian and Gay Rights In Ontario (CLRGO) (1989–1990)
- Dismantling Invisibility (1993)
- Equality for Gays and Lesbians Everywhere (EGALE) (1988–1991)
- Gay Asian AIDS Project (1990)
- Gay Community Dance Committee (GCDC) (1988–1989)
- SamiYoni (1993)
- South Asian Fellowship (SAF) (1991,1992)
- South Asian Inter-Agency Network (SAIN) (1989, 1990–1992)
- South Asian Women's Group (1987–1993)
- South Asian Lesbian and Gay Association (SALGA) (1992–1993)
- Shakti: South Asian Lesbian and Gay Network (1989–1991)
- Trikone: Lesbian and Gay South Asians (1986–1996)
