= Shamakami =

American LGBT newsletter

- Publisher: Shamakami Collective
- First issue: June 1990
- Final issue: February 1997
- Country: United States
- Based in: San Francisco
- Language: English
- ISSN: 1084-2446
- OCLC: 24646926

Shamakami was an early organization of South Asian lesbians and bisexual women based in the United States. They published a newsletter of the same name between June 1990 and February 1997.

== Founding ==
According to co-founder Sharmeen Islam, shamakami is a Bengali term meaning "love for your equal or same."

Willy Wilkinson describes "shamakami" as a reclaimed word describing a woman who desires other women, and Monisha Das Gupta describes it as an "excavated indigenous term" meaning "those who desire their equals."

Wrote Islam in A Lotus of Another Color in 1993:

"Shamakami was formed with two visions in mind: the creation of a structured way of networking for South Asian lesbians and the creation of a forum in which we can express our sexuality and feminism in our own cultural context. In 1990, Shamakami had no funds, an initial membership of about 40, and a collective of about nine women. Today the organization provides free circulation of newsletters in South Asia, has a membership of 230, and has an active collective of about twenty women. This year, a woman from Assam, one of the more remote parts of India, connected with two lesbians in different parts of India through Shamakami and thus broke her isolation. In June 1991, a contingent of South Asian lesbians participated in a gay pride parade, marching joyously behind the Shamakami banner during the gay pride festivities at San Francisco."

She described the launch of the newsletter in the AMALGM Newsletter:

We call ourselves Shamakami women. That was a statement which I wanted to make because the first newsletter was called Anamika, which means nameless. There is no word for lesbian. In my editorial I ask, are we lesbians? Is that an adequate term for us? Personally I feel really good about the word lesbian. We have to say lesbian. We have to promote it. I think we need to say lesbian in our language. And that's what I try to do in this newsletter. We are Shamakami women. We're not nameless, we re not invisible. We are who we are and proud of it. Shamakami comes out June 1st. We have a collective of fifteen members. The newsletter will be mailed out to individuals and also distributed through women's bookstores.

== Newsletter ==
Shamakami was one of the first South Asian LGBT magazines in the United States, after Anamika and Trikone.

In 1991, Feminist Collections described Shamakami as a "ten-page publication [which] offers news of relevant conferences and resources, poetry, lengthy editorials, and various personal essays." In 1992, Gay Community News described it as a "Forum for South Asian Feminist Lesbians."

The newsletter was published initially in Cambridge, Massachusetts, and later out of San Francisco, California.

Subscriptions cost $10 per year, and were offered for free to subscribers in South Asia.

Issues:

- June 1990: Volume 1, "Identifying ourselves" theme
- January 1991: Volume 2, #1
- June 1991: Volume 2, #2
- February 1992: #4
- June 1994: special edition
- November 1994: #7
- February 1997: #9, special edition published by Khuli Zaban

== Events and actions ==
In addition to the newsletter, Shamakami participated in South Asian American organizing. According to Trinity Ordona, there was an in-person group in San Francisco from 1992–1993, which organized meetings, fundraisers, and social events. It also worked with other South Asian LGBTQ organizations, endorsing a 1991 action by the Emergency Coalition to Stop HIV/AIDS in India, and co-sponsoring the 1995 Pride Utsav conference in San Francisco, organized by Trikone.

== See also ==
- Anamika newsletter, 1985-1987
- Trikone magazine
- SamiYoni magazine
- Timeline of South Asian and diasporic LGBT history
