= SamiYoni =

Former Canadian South Asian lesbian newsletter

- Editor: Neesha Dosanjh
- First issue: March 1993
- Final issue: 1994
- Country: Canada
- Based in: Toronto
- Language: English
- OCLC: 70728464

SamiYoni (sometimes spelled Sami Yoni) was a Canadian magazine for lesbians of South Asian descent, published between 1993 and 1994.

== History ==
According to a description in The Rainbow Book, "SamiYoni is a journal for Lesbians of South Asian descent. We publish visual arts, poetry, prose, essays, etc. Our objective is to create a space for the expression of South Asian Lesbians and for the political and creative ideas of South Asian Lesbians."

Reviews compared SamiYoni to other South Asian diasporic LGBTQ publications like Anamika, Shamakami, Trikone, Khush Kayal, Shakti Khabar, and Shakti Report.

The first issue was published in March 1993, and launched at the Desh Pardesh festival. It was 38 pages long, and included work from 18 South Asian Canadian lesbians, many from the Toronto area. The magazine closed by 1994.

It was edited by bookseller Neesha Dosanjh. She described the origin of the publication in an editorial in the first issue:

In the summer of 1992, a young South Asian lesbian came to me at the Toronto women's bookstore and asked, "Neesha, are there any books, anthologies, anything written by lesbians of South Asian descent?"

Together we scoured the lesbian section, the anthologies, the Asian women's section, magazines, journals. We couldn't find anything.

I was exasperated. I tried to think of a forum, any forum in Toronto, for lesbians of South Asian descent to voice how we feel, think, speak, look, hear... I was surprised that nothing was coming to mind. So I set about trying to create one version of that space. I called all the South Asian lesbians that I know here, in Toronto, got together names and numbers of others in Canada, and started bugging their asses for submissions.

== See also ==
- Anamika newsletter, 1985–1987
- Trikone magazine, 1986–2014
- Shamakami magazine, 1990–1997
- Timeline of South Asian and diasporic LGBT history
