= Anamika (newsletter) =

- Publisher: Anamika Collective
- First issue: May 1985
- Final issue: 1987
- Country: United States
- Based in: Brooklyn
- Language: English
- OCLC: 61120598

Anamika was an early newsletter for South Asian lesbians and bisexual women. The newsletter was published in Brooklyn, New York. Its first issue was published in May 1985 by a lesbian collective. Three issues were published before it shut down in 1987.

According to Nayan Shah, the collective used "the Sanskrit word anamika meaning ‘nameless,’ to address the dearth of names in South Asian languages for relationships between two women."

The newsletter contained creative writing, narratives of South Asian lesbians, and articles about topics like gay and lesbian individuals in Sri Lanka. In addition, the newsletter provided information about laws regarding homosexuality in South Asian. According to Anu, Anamika hoped to "provide a forum for debating and discussing the practical, political and theoretical issues that face South Asian lesbians."

In 1986, two of the editors wrote about the magazine in Conditions magazine:

We have produced two issues of the newsletter—the first in May '85 and the second in March '86. It is called Anamika. Through it we hope to connect with South Asian (Indian, Pakistani, Bangladeshi, Sri Lankan, Bhutanese, Nepali, Burmese and Afghani) lesbians living both in South Asia and other countries. Our network is growing. Through personal discussions with women from some of these countries we have come to know if more and more lesbians. Some sections of the women's movement in India are also growing more open to this issue. Another South Asian gay and lesbian journal called Trikon is being published by two gay Indian man from California. Annamika has received many enthusiastic responses, And he wish that there was enough time, energy, and financial resources to do all the work that needs to be done.

Anamika was mailed free to women in South Asia. Residents in the United States could purchase a subscription by mailing US$5.00 for all three issues of the newsletter. The publication of the first issue was supported by a grant from Asian Lesbians of the East Coast (ALOEC).

== Issues ==
In 2025, the June L. Mazer Lesbian Archives made the first two issues available online via the South Asian American Digital Archive.

- May 1985: Volume 1, Issue 1
- March 1986: Volume 1, Issue 2
- June 1987: Volume 1, Issue 3

== See also ==
- Shamakami, a similar newsletter started by a new South Asian lesbian collective in 1990
- SamiYoni, a similar newsletter from Toronto, running from 1993 to 1994
