= Peeling the Banana (theater troupe) =

New York City-based theatre collective of Asian American writers

Peeling the Banana, known as Peeling from 2000 onward, was a New York City-based theatre collective of Asian American writers, directors, producers, and performers active between 1995 and 2005. Formed by director and performer Gary San Angel at the Asian American Writers’ Workshop with members originally ranging between 18 and 40 years old, the group pulled from autobiographical experiences to create physical and improvisational work as well as written, developed pieces exploring different aspects of contemporary Asian American identity. Originally composed of 16 men between the ages of 18 and 40, the group grew over time from an all-male workshop to a small-scale movement with male and female members. Their first performance was off-Broadway in 1996. Live performances by the organization were held at a variety of formal and informal locations, including Joseph Papp Public Theater, Second Stage, Highways Performance Space (Los Angeles), the Desh Pardesh Festival (Toronto), and many colleges and universities, presenting narratives of the Asian American community through a combination of poetry, theater, dance, and music.

In 2000, under the direction of Jin Auh, the collective re-formed under a new organizational structure and simplified its name to “Peeling.” Peeling’s repertoire expanded beyond short plays, monologues, and performance pieces to include full-length shows with distinct directing and producing roles. Outside of productions, the collective worked to familiarize group members with a broad range of theatrical skills, including performing and writing in addition to producing and directing. The collective went on hiatus in 2003 following a three-week festival of single-act plays called “Under the Skin.”

== History ==
April 1994 (Los San Angeles) – December 1995 (New York)

Gary San Angel, the would-be founder of Peeling, participates in the “Everything You Ever Wanted To Know About Asian Men (But Didn’t Give Enough Of A Shit To Ask” autobiographical writing and performing workshop in Santa Monica, CA. led by performance artist Dan Kwong, which deconstructed and contradicted stereotypes of Asian American men. San Angel’s experience eventually led him to create a writing/performance workshop in New York for Asian American men that included around 20 men over a ten-week span.

April - May 1996 (New York University)

“Peeling the Banana”, directed by San Angel and the first official show by Peeling, is performed at New York University. In this debut performance, 14 Asian men addressed issues and stereotypes related to Asian men’s experience in America through a combination of comedy, narration, poetry, and performance arts. The show was subsequently performed at Wesleyan University in Connecticut and the Asian American Heritage Fair in New York.

August – October 1996 (New York City)

To bring in the perspectives of the female Asian American community, the Asian American Writers Workshop expanded to include women as writers and performers. Led by Mita Ghosal, Peeling the Banana showed alternating showings of men’s and women’s sections.

May 1997 (New York City)

The first Peeling the Banana show featuring LGBT Asian American performers debuted in New York City, produced in conjunction with “Queer NAsian” and “Seeds”.

October – December 1997 (Santa Monica - Philadelphia)

Members of the New York and Los Angeles groups collaborated on joint performances in New York and at Highways in Santa Monica. San Angel collaborated with Dan Kwong again when they led a workshop in Philadelphia, resulting in two new groups, Gener-Asian Next, a writing and performing workshop for teens, and Something to Say, a workshop for Asian American men and women.

March – June 1998 (New York City)

South Asian members of Peeling perform at a benefit for YSS (Youth Solidarity Summer, a non-profit summer program for South Asian youth), drawing more attention to the South Asian male community.

July - August 1998 (Toronto, Canada)

Peeling’s first international performance occurred at the Desh Pardesh Festival in Toronto, Canada, performing a workshop at the 8th annual comprehensive South Asian diasporic “intra-national festival/conference”.

July 1999 (Philadelphia, PA)

San Angel hosts “The Philly Summit” to gather all East Coast Peeling-related groups for workshops and games to unify them, including trust exercises and collaborative storytelling. Following the workshop, San Angel departs Peeling to move to Philadelphia to work with the group Asians Misbehavin’.

February 2000 (Philadelphia, PA)

Jin Auh reformed Peeling with fellow members Gita Reddy, Fitz Mangubat, Aileen Cho, Ed Lin, Regie Cabico, Carla Ching, Michel Ng, and Dan Bacalzo, with San Angel's blessing, creating a committee-based hierarchical structure and appointing the first official leadership. With completely written plays, consistent directing, and established production responsibilities, it grew into a more established theater company. Members were also introduced to the entire scope of theatre production, from acting and writing to producing and directing.

March 2002 – July 2003 (Philadelphia, PA)

Gita Reddy, with the help of fellow Peelers, started compiling a chronological account of the group's growth and appearances, aware of the relevance of Peeling to Asian American history and its fragile presence primarily in members' and viewers' memories. Peeling consistently performed at the Kraine, Puffin Space, and other locations after its re-formation. The band opted to take a break soon after approaching the pinnacle of its collective speech by first making a one-act play with a musical number and then, in 2003, a three-week series of one-act plays called "Under the Skin."

== Programs ==
“Peeling the Banana” (April 1996)

14 Asian men addressed issues and stereotypes related to Asian men’s experience in America through a combination of comedy, narration, poetry, and performance arts.

“Peeling the Banana, Slant, & Regie Cabico” (July 1996)

The first Peeling the Banana show to incorporate Asian American female writers and performers.

“Peeling the Banana & Asian I’s” (October 1996)

An Asian American women’s workshop led by Mita Ghosal in a show divided into men’s and women’s sections that played on alternate nights.

“QueerNAsian” (May 1997)

The first Peeling the Banana show to feature LGBT Asian American performers, focusing on LGBT topics in the Asian American community.

“On The Fly” (March 1998)

Peeling performed a complete show based solely on improvisations.

Desh Pardesh Festival (July 1998)

Peeling performs and hosts a workshop at the 8th annual comprehensive South Asian diasporic, which was Peeling’s first international show.

19th Annual Black, Latino & Asian Welcoming Ceremony (August 1998)

Peeling, representing the first inclusion of the Asian & Asian American student body, performs at this ceremony.

“Subway” (April 1999)

Thematically linked and interwoven individual performance pieces on a stage area covered with subway maps.

“The Philly Summit” (July 1999)

Gary San Angel organizes the summit to help East Coast Peeling-related groups bond through various activities.

AAWW Workshop, NYC (January – March 2002)

Peeling facilitated a six-week workshop as the culmination of rekindling a full relationship with the AAWW and welcoming a new generation of members.

“Vampire Geishas of Brooklyn” (July 2002)

Peeling creates its first full-length, single story show for its first 9-day, three-week run.

== Notable members ==
Notable members of Peeling the Banana and Peeling include Gary San Angel (founder), Jin Auh, Gita Reddy, Fitz Mangubat, Aileen Cho, Ed Lin, Regie Cabico, Carla Ching, Michel Ng, Dan Bacalzo, Sarita Khurana, Parag Khandhar, Ngo Thanh Nhan, Tamina Davar, Mike Kang, Dave Lin, Hugo Mulchand Mahabir, and Bertrand Wang.
