= Carla Ching =

American playwright, television writer and teacher

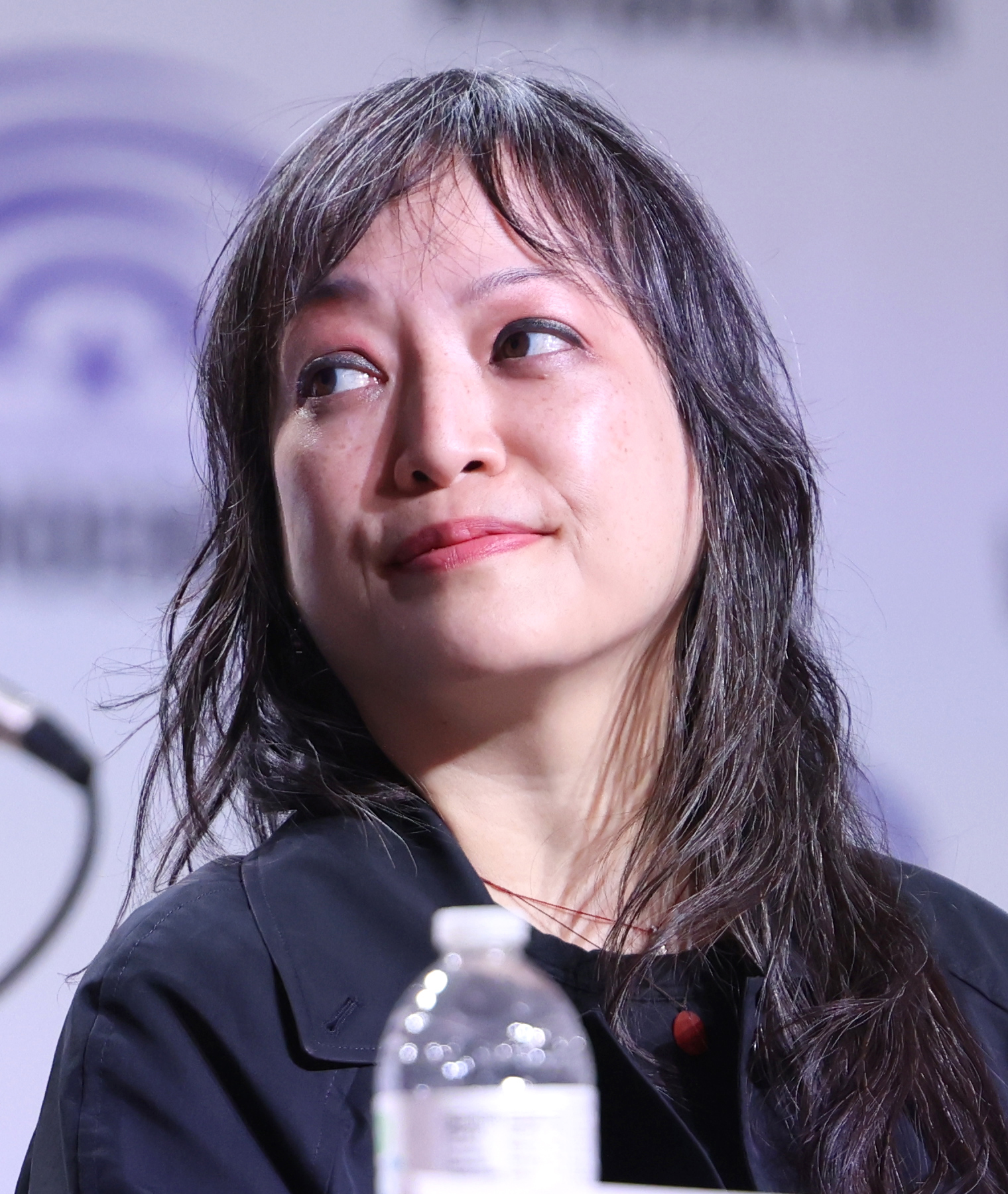
Ching at the 2025 WonderCon

Carla Ching is an American playwright, television writer, and teacher. Ching has written for multiple television shows including, USA’s series, Graceland (TV series), AMC’s Fear the Walking Dead, Amazon’s I Love Dick (TV series), Hulu’s The First, and AMC’s Preacher (TV series). She has also written many of her own full length and one act plays: Nomad Motel, The Two Kids That Blow Shit Up, Fast Company, The Sugar House at the Edge of the Wilderness, Dirty and Big Blind/Little Blind and eight one act plays. Ching has taught numerous workshops at New York Victory Theatre, Lincoln Center Institute, The Public Theatre, The Women’s Project, American Palace Theatre, TDF, Young Playwrights, The Wallis Annenberg Center, and Center Theatre Group. Ching received a Bachelor of Arts from Vassar College and a Masters in Fine Arts from The New School of Drama. Ching taught play writing at Pace University in New York City and is a member of the Kilroys and New Dramatists.

== Childhood and education ==
Carla Ching grew up in Encino, Los Angeles, California with her parents and sister. She was extremely shy throughout middle school and had trouble speaking up in class. Ching forced herself to audition for a show at her high school to push herself to be more outspoken. She soon discovered that being in the theatre community made her part of a team that included people from all different friend groups, backgrounds, and ethnicities coming together with one common goal: to understand one another. This is where her idea of theatre as " the great equalizer" stems from.

Carla Ching took a break from her life in the theatre for her college career. She attended Vassar College in Poughkeepsie, New York where she studied film and received a minor in education. Ching believed she would be a poet and would support herself as a teacher and decided to stay in the New York area, specifically New York City after graduation to begin her career as a middle school English teacher.

== Life in New York ==
Ching worked at multiple different educational institutions during her time as an English Teacher. The first school she taught at was a junior high school in East Harlem in which most of her students were economically disadvantaged. She found many of her students there faced difficulty focusing during her class due to outside stresses. Later, she taught at Hunter College High School, a school for gifted students who, based on test scores, represent the top one-quarter 1% of students in New York City. Ching claims her teaching job at Hunter College High School was the best job she has ever had but she was expected to teach at a college level, which left her no time to write.

Ching began to search for a community in New York where she came across Peeling, a pan-Asian performance collective at the Asian American Writer's Workshop. Ching was initially attracted to Peeling because she thought she would find a deeper sense of community amongst people with similar backgrounds/ethnicity as herself and felt she could workshop her poetry there. Ching worked with Peeling for three years, contributing to their autobiographical performance art, beginning with her poems and expanding to larger works she began writing inspired by the small cruelties she faced (or witnessed) on the streets of New York City. The pieces she workshopped to at Peeling became increasingly more performative and steadily began to include more people until she realized she was creating theatre. Ching claims she "grew tired of her own voice" which motivated her to begin writing characters with their own narrative and began attempting full length plays. However, Ching realized she had not learned about theatre writing before and was lacking the tools to create what she wanted so she went back to school.

Ching received her Masters of Fine Arts from The New School for Drama in New York City. Immediately following grad school, Ching became a teaching artist. She again utilized her minor in education, traveling by subway to different New York City public schools to teach about the art of theatre and theatre making.

== Plays and playwriting ==
Shortly after Ching began writing full length plays, she stopped performing in them. Ching claims this is due to the lack of representation of Asian women in theatre, and her feelings that there were more talented Asian American actors than herself who deserve the roles. Her full length plays focus on broad questions. Carla Ching has stated that some of the questions are "Why are parents so hard on their kids?" Why do people lie?" "Why are we so mean to people that we love?" Ching claims the question need to make her angry enough that she can stick with that question for however many years it takes to complete the play, and that she hopes that during that time she answers the question for herself.

=== Full-length plays ===
- Nomad Motel is about "Motel Kids/Parachute Kids" raising themselves and living on the poverty line. This drama is about 100 minutes long with a cast of two women and three men. The story of Alix, who lives in a motel room with his mom and two brothers and is desperately trying to make ends meet and Mason, who lives in a barren mansion while his father is away running jobs for the Hong Kong Triad. Mason's father vanishes, leaving Mason to care for himself, and hiding from the INS and Child Services. Mason and Alix become friends through their struggle to survive and escape their parents' mistakes. Nomad Motel was produced at the O'Neill Playwrights Conference, National New Play Network Showcase of New Plays, Atlantic Theatre Company's Mixfest, City Theatre Company and is an SCR Time Warner CrossRoads Commission.
- The Two Kids That Blow Shit Up takes place in New York, but was written by Cara Ching in Los Angeles. This play made Ching realize she needed to become more familiar with Los Angeles in order to make it a setting for her plays. With a cast of two people (one male, one female), the play is about falling in and out of love with your best friend. More specifically, Max and Diana who are forced to play together while their parents go on a date. Over the course of their parents relationship (dating, marriage, and eventually divorce) Max and Diana become unpredictably close and they see each other through the ups and downs of their own adult lives. The Two Kids That Blow Shit Up has been produced by Huntington Theatre Company's Breaking Ground Festival, Artists at Play and Mu Performing Arts and runs approximately 75 minutes in length.
- Fast Company According to Ching the play was inspired by the questions: What is family? Why do we run cons each other every day? What is talent and how do we use talent? Is family just blood, or the people one chooses to surround themselves with? With a cast of two women and two men this dark comedy is about 90 minutes long and is a winner of the Edgerton New American Play Award and the Seattle Times Footlights Award for one of the year's best New Plays on a Small Stage. It is an EST/Sloan Commission and has been produced by South Coast Rep, Ensemble Studio Theatre, Porkfilled Productions, and Lyric Stage in Boston.
- The Sugar House at The Edge of the Wilderness was first produced with a cast of six (three women, three men) at the Ma-Ying Theatre Company. This drama is an adaptation of the classic children's fairytale Hansel and Gretel in which the two children, Han and Greta are adopted from China and are abandoned by their adopted parents and forced to live with their uncle, a rock journalist, in his apartment in the East Village of Chicago. Greta's rebellious nature turns dangerous when she begins to experiment with arson and is institutionalized. The Sugar House at the Edge of the Wilderness consists of two acts and runs about 90 minutes.
- TBA consists of two acts and utilizes a cast of two women and three men with a run time of 120 minutes. It has been produced by 2g and The Women's Project and is published in Out of Time and Place edited by Alexis Clements and Christine Evans. TBA is drama about Silas Parks who, prompted by a breakup, becomes a recluse, writing autobiographical stories from his Brooklyn apartment. After some fame for his stories, Silas' adopted brother, Finn, accuses Silas of stealing his life.
- Dirty is about 80 minutes long and requires a cast of four, two women and two men. There have been staged readings of Dirty by IRT, and Cannery Works with Stamford Center for the Arts and it was a finalist for Cherrylane Mentorship Project and Ignition Festival at Victory Gardens.

One acts
Title	Year	Producer/Theatre Company or Project	Approximate Run Time	Cast Required	Accolades
Caught	2001	No Pants Theater Company, Manhattan Theater Source	30 minutes	1 male, 1 female	
Closing Up Shop	2003	Seven.11 Convenience Theatre, Center Stage	11 minutes	1 female, 2 males	Published in The Best of Seven.11 Convenience Theatre: 2003-2009
Dissipating Heat		Desipina and Company, 7-eleven Convenience Theatre	11 minutes	2 females, 1 male	Heideman Award from Actors Theater of Louisville Finalist
First			45 minutes	3 females, 3 males	
Girl Bully			30 minutes	1 female, 1 male	
Mending		The Women's Project, "Playing in Traffic," at ESt	10 minutes	1 female, 2 males	
The Further Adventures of Little Goth Girl	2007	Ten, Second Generation, Public Theatre	14 minutes	2 females, 3 males	
The Next Big Thing		Vampire Cowboys' Revamped at the Battle Ranch	10 minutes	2 males	

== Life back in California ==
Carla Ching was brought back to her home-state of California when her boyfriend at the time moved there for work. They were dating in New York City before he moved to Los Angeles for the pilot season of a television series. He later called her and said he felt he needed to stay in Los Angeles. The two remained in a long distance relationship for some time before Ching decided to move to California to try her hand at working in television. She put most of her stuff in storage in New York, in case she were to move back. Ching worked as a secretary in Los Angeles for one year before she was hired as a writer for season 2 of USA's television series, Graceland (her first experience in television). She has gone on to write for AMC's Fear the Walking Dead, Amazon's I Love Dick, Hulu's The First, and AMC's The Preacher. She has since removed her belongings from storage in New York and moved them to California. Ching claims her adult relationship with Los Angeles is very different than the one she had with the city as a child and is excited about getting reacquainted with Los Angeles as a character for her plays, as New York was.

== Teaching ==
Carla Ching remains an active theatre artist and teacher. She has taught workshops at the New York Victory Theatre, Lincoln Center Institute, The Public Theatre, The Women's Project, American Place Theatre, Young Playwrights, TDF, The Wallis Annenberg Center, and Center Theatre Group. She taught playwriting at Pace University in New York City, and is an active member of The Kilroys and New Dramatists.
