= Uttam Bandu Tupe =

Indian writer (1932–2020)

Uttam Tupe (28 December 1932 – 26 April 2020) was a writer and poet from Pune, India. He wrote several hundred short stories and 16 novels. One of his books was made into a successful play, and another into a feature film. Tupe also wrote about the social ills of the caste system and issues with Devadasi.

== Early life ==
Tupe wrote a series of novels with a Devadasi theme that were released into the Marathi literary scene in the 1980s. Tupe began writing in the rustic dialect of his native Satara district. He crafted a short story on the evils of the dowry system. It was immediately published, and a few months later, Tupe got Rs 501 as a cash prize from the Marathi Maharashtra Sahitya Parishad.

== Works ==
- Katyavaraci pota – Mehata Pablisinga Hausa; 3. avrtti edition (2001)
- Jhulava (झुलवा)
- Katyavaraci pota – 2001
- Kalasi – 1988
- Andana – 1986
- Jhavala – Publisher: Mehata Pablisinga Hausa; Prathamavrtti edition (1991)
- Zulwa – 1986, 2005
- Zulwa – The book Zulwa was adapted into a play by Chetan Datar for Marathi theatre. The play was an adaptation of the novel by Uttam Bandu Tupe who spent two years in a colony of jogtis to research the novel.

== Reception ==
Other authors have called Tupe a "noted subservient writer". Naik goes on to say that Tupe as well as Sri Patange, Texas Gaekawad, and Namedeo Kamble all "are harmful in the sense that they depict life artificially and deliberately and mislead life."

== Social cause ==
In all his works Tupe was concerned with the crushing burden poor villagers carry. Zulva, the most popular novel, deals with the plight of devadasis. Other themes include: Villagers superstitions, dowry murders, and the problems of unemployed youth and migrants.
