= Poshida: Hidden LGBT Pakistan =

2015 Pakistani and British documentary film

- Directed by: Faizan Fiaz
- Release date: 2015
- Running time: 25
- Countries: Pakistan, UK
- Language: English

Poshida: Hidden LGBT Pakistan is a 2015 Pakistani and British documentary about the LGBT community in Pakistan. Created by Faizan Fiaz and others, the 25-minute documentary explores the lives of a group of LGBT Pakistanis. It was described by the Daily Pakistan as the first ever movie on the topic. The film screened at film festivals in Spain and the United States.

According to one of the directors, Poshida means "hidden" or "veiled", and refers to the role of respect or personal reputation in Pakistani society. The film explores Pakistani LGBT history and culture, media representations of trans women, and addresses a Lahore serial killer targeting gay men. One of its ongoing themes is the role of British colonialism and United States foreign policy on the LGBT Community. In interviews, filmmakers pointed to the role of British colonial rule in the development of Pakistan's sodomy laws.

The team interviewed dozens more people than finally appeared in the film. The final list of subjects included Pakistani-Canadian-American actress Fawzia Mirza, who brought her one-woman show Me, My Mom & Sharmila to Pakistan, with mixed reviews because of lesbian themes.

== Production ==
Due to Pakistan's laws and conservative social values, the directors remained anonymous while talking to the press.

In one interview, one of the filmmakers described to Outright Action International their attempts to showcase LGBT Pakistanis, and to clarify the distinctions between different groups, such as gay and transgender people. In another interview, a filmmaker told Attitude magazine that the biggest challenge associated with creating the film was finding people willing to appear on camera. One of the filmmakers described the challenge in a TakePart interview:

It was less dangerous for us to make the film than for those in it to participate. For that reason, we need to be careful about where the film is screened and to take measures to protect the identity of people associated with it. The main challenges were to get certain people to take part, particularly lesbians and trans guys. We actually met far more contributors than are in the film, but so few were comfortable to be on camera.The film editor in Pakistan did not want to be credited on the film, and some contributors asked for their voices and faces to be disguised.

== See also ==
- LGBT rights in Pakistan
- LGBT history in Pakistan
- Timeline of South Asian and diasporic LGBT history
