= Chetan Datar =

Chetan Datar was a playwrighter based in India. His first play, Zulva (play), was based on Uttam Bandu Tupe's book Zulwa which was written about the Devadasi system. The play was well received and directed by Waman Kendre".

Datar subsequently wrote Savlya (1987), his debut play written under the mentorship of Satyadev Dubey; Ek Madhav Baug (1998), which premiered in 2002; Radha Vaje Ranade (1999); and Giribala (2007), a dance-theatre adaptation of a short story by Rabindranath Tagore.
