= Desh Pardesh =

Canadian annual art festival

Desh Pardesh (1988 - 2001) was an annual arts festival in Toronto that focused on queer and South Asian culture. Desh's mandate was queer-positive, feminist, anti-racist, anti-imperialist, and anti caste/classist.

Desh Pardesh is Hindi for "home away from home" or "at home abroad". The festival was an intersection of politics, culture, and activism that aimed to battle stereotypes of lesbians and gays within the South Asian community and to undo North American assumptions about South Asians. The festival consisted of film screenings, workshops, seminars, readings of literary work, performance art, as well as music and dance performances. These programs were typically followed by question and answer sessions with the presenting artists. Desh also hosted discussion groups, exhibitions, workshops, networking sessions, receptions, and dance parties.

== History ==
=== Salaam Toronto and Khalla (1988-89) ===
Desh began as a one-day event in 1988 called Salaam Toronto, organised by Khush: South Asian Gay Men of Toronto. The event was a collaborative effort between several Khush members, including Ian Iqbal Rashid and Nelson Carvolho. This was Khush's first ever cultural event, and was an "informal celebration of South Asian fashion, food, and culture." The event saw over 800 attendees, and laid the groundwork for Khush's next event, a three-day program on film, video, and art called Khalla. Khalla was later renamed and expanded to become Desh Pardesh in 1990.

Salaam Toronto and Khalla were praised by attendees for providing South Asian artists and queer people a place where they felt included and could represent themselves fully. Though largely popular, Salaam Toronto also received backlash from some members of Toronto's South Asian community. Punam Khosla, a prominent lesbian activist and future Desh organiser, criticised Salaam Toronto's organisers for a lack of class awareness and little to no gender diversity, calling the event "basically a drag show."

=== Desh Pardesh (1990) ===
Held at Toronto's Euclid Cinema, the first official Desh Pardesh was a one-day event with 200 attendees. The total budget for the event was $600. Khosla again criticised the festival, noting that only one of the programs included queer artists. During one particular panel on South Asian authors and writing, Khosla called out speakers for insinuating South Asian women held privileges over South Asian men. She alleges the ensuing debate resulted in her being approached by Rashid to work as an organiser for Desh.

=== Desh Pardesh (1991–1995) ===
In 1991, Desh Pardesh was registered as a non-profit organisation. The event grew to an annual five-day festival of film, poetry, dance, and performance and continued to be hosted at Euclid Cinema, with pop-up events happening at cafés, artist-run centres, and theatres around Toronto. Over 50% of programming was dedicated to showcasing gay and lesbian artists, with one day of the five-day festival being exclusively lesbian and gay programming. The 1991 Desh program formed the core content for the first issue of Rungh Magazine, launched in April 1992, which included transcriptions from presenters as well as responses to programming.

In 1992, Desh began receiving support from the Toronto Arts Council through their Cultureworks program.

By the early 1990s, Desh had become an invaluable resource for anti-racist activists and organisations. Organisers worked frequently with other racialized communities, including supporting the 1995 protests following the shooting of Dudley George. In 1994 Desh formed an alliance with the Toronto Coalition Against Racism (TCAR), a coalition of 50 anti-racist social justice organisations.

As Desh drew in a wider and older audience, there were concerns that the festival had deviated from its original purpose of giving voice to the South Asian queer community. Participation from NGOs and sponsorships from local businesses had increased by 1993, with what started as a team of 20 volunteers now being made up of two full-time staff members, eight board members, and 2,000 volunteers. In 1994, the festival moved from the Euclid Cinema to a YMCA building. By 1995, Desh drew in over 5,000 attendees every year and had a budget of $150,000. While this growth intimidated some, many artists appreciated the rich and diverse perspectives brought by the new attendees. As Desh penetrated the mainstream, participants took advantage of the influx of artists and community activists to network and collaborate.

Poet Leah Lakshmi Piepznsa-Samarasinha, who first encountered the festival in 1996, said of Desh in 2005:

"It's hard to remember that being brown in the 70s and 80s sucked. It meant feeling like you were from another planet—one where your food stank, your parents were “weird” and you were trying to balance traditional culture with the realities of growing up second-generation. Things were even worse if you were a girl who wanted to avoid marriage, a boy who wanted other boys, a time-expired Indian from Trinidad, a desi bent on revolution. In the late 80s Toronto onward, Desh Pardesh was the answer to that suckiness."

=== Desh Pardesh (1996–1999) ===
After Premier of Ontario Mike Harris' election in 1995, cuts to arts funding affected Desh and began to cause organisational issues for the festival. At this time Zainub Verjee, a former curator for Desh, cited rising political and administrative conflicts between festival organisers, volunteers, and participants.

In the late 1990s a group of visual artists working as curators for Desh formed the South Asian Visual Arts Collective, later renamed the South Asian Visual Arts Centre (SAVAC). SAVAC was fully established as an artist-run centre in 1997 and continued to collaborate with Desh until its closure.

=== Desh Pardesh (2000–2001) ===
The closure of the Desh Pardesh festival is largely believed to be a result of an overwhelming financial deficit caused by cuts to funding. However, Fatima Amarshi, the executive director at the time, stated that there was no clear idea of the reason for the deficit, or the deficits true amount. In December 2000, it was estimated that $10,000 was needed immediately, in addition to $50,000 for long term operations. Despite attracting around 4,000 attendees each year the not-for-profit festival received little in terms of sponsorships or grants, and had no plans to increase their annual membership fee. Amarshi's controversial plans to reach out to large corporations for sponsorships ultimately failed, and the festival officially closed in August 2001.

Sharon Fernandez, a former advisor for the Canada Council of the Arts, noted that the rapid expansion of Desh in the mid-1990s may have contributed to its eventual disbandment, stating that "[..] the polyphony of voices involved in shaping what Desh was and should be also resulted in Desh being pulled in many directions, and this, many argue, was a factor in Desh’s eventual demise." She elaborates further, claiming a combination of administrative failures, disconnection from community, and a shift away from radical politics are also possible factors in Desh's demise.

== Programs ==
=== Film showcases ===
Showcases were of non-commercially produced films that focus on experiences of the South Asian queer community.

Workshops included instructor-led activities, group discussions, and performance-based expressions that centered on facilitating dialogue between members of the South Asian community and with the broader community.

=== Live theatre ===
Live performances that were presented included Raj, Raj, Against the Dying of the Light (1990), which was performed at Euclid Theatre and focused on the empowerment of the South Asian community.

At the 8th annual Desh Pardesh was where Peeling the Banana's first international performance occurred.

=== Public readings ===
Desh Pardesh hosted reading of works that explored race, religion, sexual orientation, communalism, fundamentalism, discrimination, and more from South Asian writers.
