= Pravartak =

Early LGBT magazine published in India (1991-2000)

- Categories: LGBTQ
- Founded: 1991
- Final issue: 2000
- Country: India
- Based in: Kolkata
- Language: English, Bengali

Pravartak (later renamed Naya Pravartak) was an early LGBT magazine published in Kolkata, India, published from 1991 to 2000, in English and Bengali.

== History ==
From 1991 to 1992, there were three issues published by a small group of individuals. The original magazine was created on an old Remington typewriter, late at night so no one would hear, and distributed through cyclostyle.

It was rebooted in 1993 by Counsel Club, a newly-formed support group for gender and sexual minorities. Counsel Club published another six issues between 1993 and 1996, and the magazine continued on until the final issue published in 2000, when it was a Bengali tabloid. The magazine was renamed Naya Pravartak in 1995, and that name was used until the publication ended in 2000.

The magazine was distributed almost entirely through private circulation, via word of mouth among LGBTQ people, community institutions and events, and via the Counsel club meetings. A few copies were distributed through Classic Books and Seagull Bookstore in Kolkata, and People Tree in New Delhi.

== Contents and impact ==
Writer Soumitra Das described the magazine and its impact in The Telegraph:

It carried analytical articles, short stories, poetry, first person stories and interviews - whatever was happening in the LGBT world. Its content was in English and Bengali (occasionally in Hindi as well). Sexual health work and gender, as well as sexuality and diversity were its primary concerns. Counsel Club managed to bring together hundreds of people. One important discussion in Pravartak was on how Bengali literature reflected the LGBT world. In the pre-Internet era, Pravartak was like a connecting link for queer people spread across India and abroad.

According to India Today, Naya Pravartak was Calcutta's "hottest-selling media offering to gays," which "offers advice on safer sex, fiction, poetry, gay conferences, the gay underground, and contacts."

The Varta online magazine, established in 2013, was co-founded by one of the original publishers of Pravartak, and has been described as being a continuation of Pravartak.
