= Nayan Shah =

American historian and academic

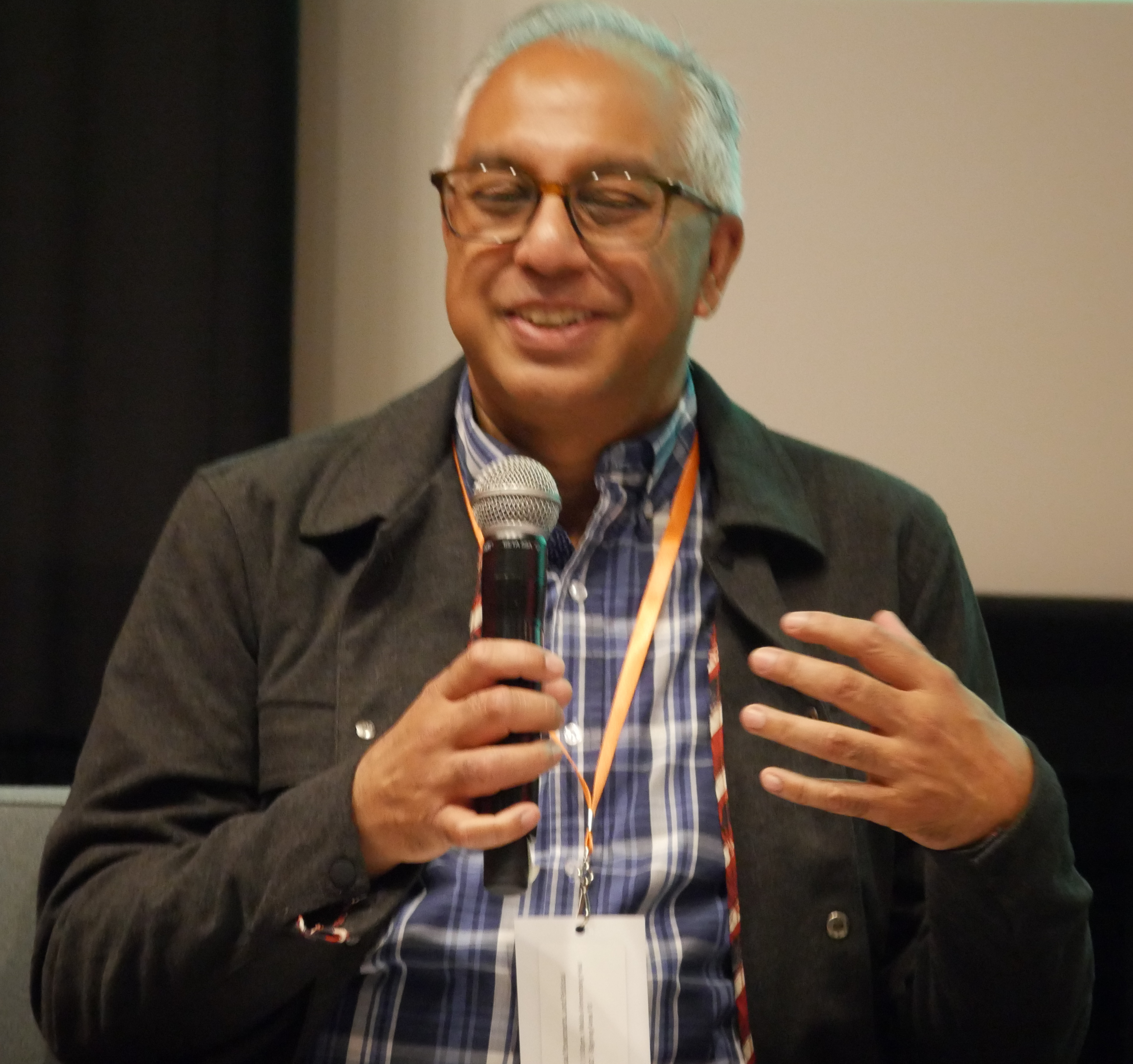
- Shah in 2012
- Education: Ph.D. History, University of Chicago, 1995; M.A. History, University of Chicago, 1990; B.A. History, Economics and Religion, Swarthmore College, 1988
- Occupations: Professor of American Studies and Ethnicity and History at University of Southern California; Professor, University of California, San Diego, 2012-; Associate Professor, University of California, San Diego, 2000-2012; Assistant Professor, Binghamton University, 1995-2000

Nayan Shah is Professor of American Studies and Ethnicity and History at University of Southern California. He received his doctoral degree in history at the University of Chicago and previously worked as a professor of history at University of California, San Diego and Binghamton University.

== Research and teaching ==
Shah is a historian with expertise in North American and global struggles over public health, migration and incarceration from the mid-nineteenth through twenty-first centuries. His research is most well known for its reconceptualization of how racial meanings are remade by articulations of gender and sexuality in state politics and culture.

Shah's first book, Contagious Divides: Epidemics and Race in San Francisco's Chinatown, investigates the long history of the perception of Chinatown and Chinese immigrants as sources of contagion. The book examines how the demonization of Chinese immigrants reverberated in policy, politics and cultural life of San Francisco residents and the United States. Shah shows how Chinese Americans responded to health regulations and allegations with persuasive political speeches, lawsuits, boycotts, violent protests, and poems. Adroitly employing discourses of race and health, these activists argued that Chinese Americans were worthy and deserving of sharing in the resources of American society. Contagious Divides won the Association of Asian American Studies History Book Prize in 2002.

In his second book Stranger Intimacy: Contesting Race, Sexuality, and the Law in the North American West, Shah explores the contestations over the meanings of state power and citizenship through the social relationships that arose among South Asian migrants in the western United States and Canada in the twentieth century. "Stranger Intimacy" received the American Historical Association Pacific Branch Norris and Carol Hundley Award for Most Distinguished Book on any historical subject.

Shah’s third book, Refusal to Eat: A Century of Prison Hunger Strikes, traces the global history of mass hunger strikes throughout the twentieth and twenty-first centuries. Using case studies drawn from U.S. and British suffragettes, Irish Republicans, Bengali prisoners, Japanese American Internees, South African anti-apartheid activists, Guantanamo prisoners, and detained asylum seekers, Refusal to Eat explores how prisoners wield the hunger strike to communicate viscerally within and outside the walls of the prison. Erupting out of moments of democratic upheavals, hunger strikes unleash volatile personal and political power to upend prison regimes, governments and assumptions about gender, race and the body’s endurance. Although varying in their ability to yield immediate results, Shah argues that hunger strike protests can propel far-reaching and unexpected effects across the globe and throughout history.

Shah is featured in documentaries on PBS and the History Channel. He has worked with the National Park Service, Angel Island Foundation, California Historical Society, Fowler Museum (UCLA) and the New York Historical Society to document and imaginatively interpret Asian Americans in the past and present.
