= Ifti Nasim =

American poet (1946–2011)

- Born: September 14, 1946; Faisalabad, Pakistan
- Died: July 22, 2011 (aged 64–65); Chicago, Illinois, U.S.
- Occupation: Poet

Ifti Nasim (1946 – July 22, 2011) was a gay Pakistani American poet. Having moved to the United States to escape persecution for his sexual orientation, he became known locally for establishing Sangat, an organization to support LGBT South Asian youths, and internationally for publishing Narman, a poetry collection that was the first open expression of homosexual themes in the Urdu language. Nasim was inducted into the Chicago Gay and Lesbian Hall of Fame in 1996.

== Personal life ==
Nasim was born in Faisalabad, Pakistan (then called Lyallpur), shortly before independence, a middle child in a large family. As a teenager he felt ostracized and alone, and was unable to live openly as gay. At 16, Nasim was shot in the leg by a soldier while reading a politically charged poem, during a protest against martial law. This left lasting injuries, causing Nasim to be unable to perform classical Kathak dance. At 21, he emigrated to the US, inspired in part by an article in Life magazine that he recalled describing the US as "the place for gays to be in" and in part due to the fact that his father was trying to marry him to a girl, leading Nasim to lie to his father and tell him he was going to America for a visit. Several of his siblings later followed him to the US, and he eventually naturalized as a US citizen.

Nasim first arrived in New York City, staying at a YMCA hostel on 42nd Street. Reflecting on his arrival, he said: "I was tall, dark, handsome and exotic, so right away people were making passes at me. Even in the toilets, when I went there... I wrote a poem about it." He later moved to Detroit and enrolled at Wayne State University.

While in the US, Nasim continued to write poetry and worked to bring several siblings to the country. In 1974, he settled in Chicago, where he discovered the city's vibrant gay nightlife. Initially hesitant to enter gay bars, Nasim recalled: "At first I was afraid to go into a gay bar, but I went in. They were the nicest people on the planet earth. I said, What the [heck]—why haven’t I been here before? It was a non-stop party; I loved it."

Nasim worked at a gay bar named Bistro owned by Eddie Dugan as a go-go dancer. He met his lover Prem, a relationship that lasted a while till Nasim discovered Prem was married; after 3–4 years however the two met again and Nasim learnt that Prem was divorced, leading the two to date again and eventually become a long lasting couple.

In 1986, Nasim co-founded Sangat, one of the first South Asian LGBTQ+ organizations in the United States. Initially called Trikone/Chicago, the group was incorporated as Sangat/Chicago, Inc. in 1998 and dissolved in 2007. The organization provided resources and support for queer South Asians in the Midwest, fostering a sense of belonging. Nasim, having experienced isolation firsthand, saw Sangat as a way to create solidarity and community. He also served as president of the South Asian Performing Arts Council of America, hosted a radio talk show, and wrote columns for Weekly Pakistan News. In these columns, he frequently challenged societal hypocrisy, criticizing what he called the "self-ordained 'pious and decent' members" of society.

Nasim died in a hospital in Chicago on July 22, 2011, at the age of 64, following a heart attack. His legacy was honored by many, including activist Debanuj Dasgupta, who met Nasim shortly after immigrating to the US. Dasgupta recalled: "I poured my heart out to him, and he counseled me, sang songs to me, and told me which bars I could go to to meet people... He was a landing pad for many LGBT immigrants." Dasgupta emphasized the need to preserve Nasim's contributions as part of the broader history of queer migration: "These catalogs don’t always exist for people of color."

== Poetry ==
The publication for which Nasim was best known was a book of poetry entitled Narman, a word meaning "hermaphrodite" or "half-man, half-woman" in Persian. It met immediate controversy in Pakistan and had to be distributed underground; even the printer of the book, belatedly realizing its contents, was reported to shout, "Take these unholy and dirty books away from me, or I'll set them on fire!" Despite the backlash, Narman had a profound influence on younger generations of Pakistani poets, inspiring a movement known as "Narmani poetry," characterized by emotional honesty and openness about queer identity. As Nasim explained: "The young people, when they read this poetry, that was revelation for them that somebody can write like that too. So they become enamored with this poetry, and they start writing about true feeling... Before that, our object of love was androgynous... now they started calling whatever."

However, its frankness inspired a younger generation of Pakistani poets to write "honest" poetry, a genre becoming known as "narmani" poetry.

Nasim later published Myrmecophile in 2000. The title references an insect that lives within an ant colony despite being a different species, symbolizing Nasim's experience as an immigrant navigating multiple identities. The cover featured Nasim in flamboyant drag and the poems addressed topics like queer trauma, religious hypocrisy, and taboo desire. His final collection, Abdoz (2005), returned to earlier themes while contemplating mortality. One of its most striking lines reads: "I feel my life was spent in a submarine / The journey has ended; I saw nothing."

He later released Myrmecophile in 2000, and Abdoz in 2005.
