= AIDS Bhedbhav Virodhi Andolan =

HIV/AIDS activism group in India

AIDS Bhedbhav Virodhi Andolan (ABVA; 'AIDS Anti-Discrimination Movement') was the first HIV/AIDS activist movement in India founded in 1988 in New Delhi. The group received popular recognition with the publication of its pioneering report "Less than Gay" in 1991. Through this report, ABVA advocated for civil rights of LGBTQ people to include same sex marriage, LGBT parenting, and the decriminalization of homosexuality through the repeal of Section 377 of the Indian Penal Code. In 1994, ABVA filed the first petition challenging the constitutionality of Section 377 in the Delhi High Court, in order to challenge prison authorities' ban on condom distribution.

== Brief Background ==
ABVA got involved in AIDS activism in 1989 on hearing from women in the red-light area that doctors from the All India Institute of Medical Sciences (AIIMS) and the Indian Council of Medical Research (ICMR) had forcibly tested them for HIV, with the help of the police. ABVA protested this action, asking that good quality condoms, humane treatment and rehabilitation schemes for HIV positive people be made a prerequisite for any government screening for HIV. In addition, it began running a free dispensary for sex workers in Delhi's GB Road District.

Between February 1990 and August 1991, the ABVA organised several demonstrations in New Delhi to protest against the prevailing discriminatory attitude of authorities against HIV/AIDS victims.

The 1994, ABVA petition was filed in the Delhi high court in response to the then IG (Prisons) Kiran Bedi blocking access to condoms at Tihar Jail, India's largest prison. Reacting to claims that two-thirds of all inmates at Tihar had engaged in homosexual behaviour, Bedi said consensual homosexual behaviour was virtually unknown at Tihar and that usage of condoms would promote homosexuality.

== Less Than Gay ==
In late 1991, ABVA came out with a report titled "Less Than Gay: A Citizens' Report on the Status of Homosexuality in India" which was the first document to publicly demand queer rights in India including same-sex marriage.

The report was an interesting breakthrough and is regarded with respect as it provided the first resource on homosexuality in India.

In 2022, ABVA released the 2nd edition of the report, detailing their struggle since 1988-89 for the full repeal of Section 377.

== Activities ==
ABVA's activities included:

- Public advocacy; one success included stalling the AIDS Prevention Bill in 1989 through numerous petitions to Indian parliament.
- Organizing public meetings, protest actions and public demonstrations as part of AIDS activism in India.
- Networking with AIDS activists and activist organizations in India and abroad.
- Grass-root work in Delhi slums and with gay people, with other NGO's involvement.
- Research and publication of citizen reports.
- Campaigning for the decriminalization of sodomy in India through efforts to repeal all discriminatory legislation.
