= Trikone =

Trikone (Hindustani pronunciation: [t̪rɪˈkoːn]) is an US-based 501(c)(4) support, social, and political action umbrella organization with chapters in San Francisco, Chicago, Seattle, and Tampa Bay for South Asian lesbian, gay, bisexual, transgender and queer people. Trikone was founded in 1986 in the San Francisco Bay Area and is one of the oldest queer South Asian activist groups in the world. Trikone’s members and affiliates trace their ancestry to one of the following countries: Afghanistan, Bangladesh, Bhutan, India, Maldives, Myanmar (Burma), Nepal, Pakistan, Sri Lanka, and Tibet.

"Trikone" (Hindi/Marathi/Sanskrit: त्रिकोण, Telugu: త్రికోణ్, Urdu: تْرِكون, Gujarati: ત્રિકોણ, Punjabi: ਤ੍ਰਿਕੋਣ, Bengali: ত্রিকোণ, Malayalam: ത്രികോൺ, Kannada: ತ್ರಿಕೋನ) means "triangle" in many South Asian languages. Trikone, or "triangle", references the organization's logo, an inverted pink triangle that traces its origin to the inverted pink triangle badge used in Nazi concentration camps to distinguish gay men, lesbian, and transgender women prisoners. The symbol has since been reappropriated by many queer organizations, including Trikone, as a symbol of pride. Additionally, the inverted triangle of Trikone's logo roughly traces the shape of the Indian subcontinent, a signifier of their identity-based membership.

== San Francisco Chapter ==
=== Founding ===
After a transformative San Francisco LGBTQ+ Pride Parade in 1986, Arvind Kumar and Suvir Das co-founded Trikone.

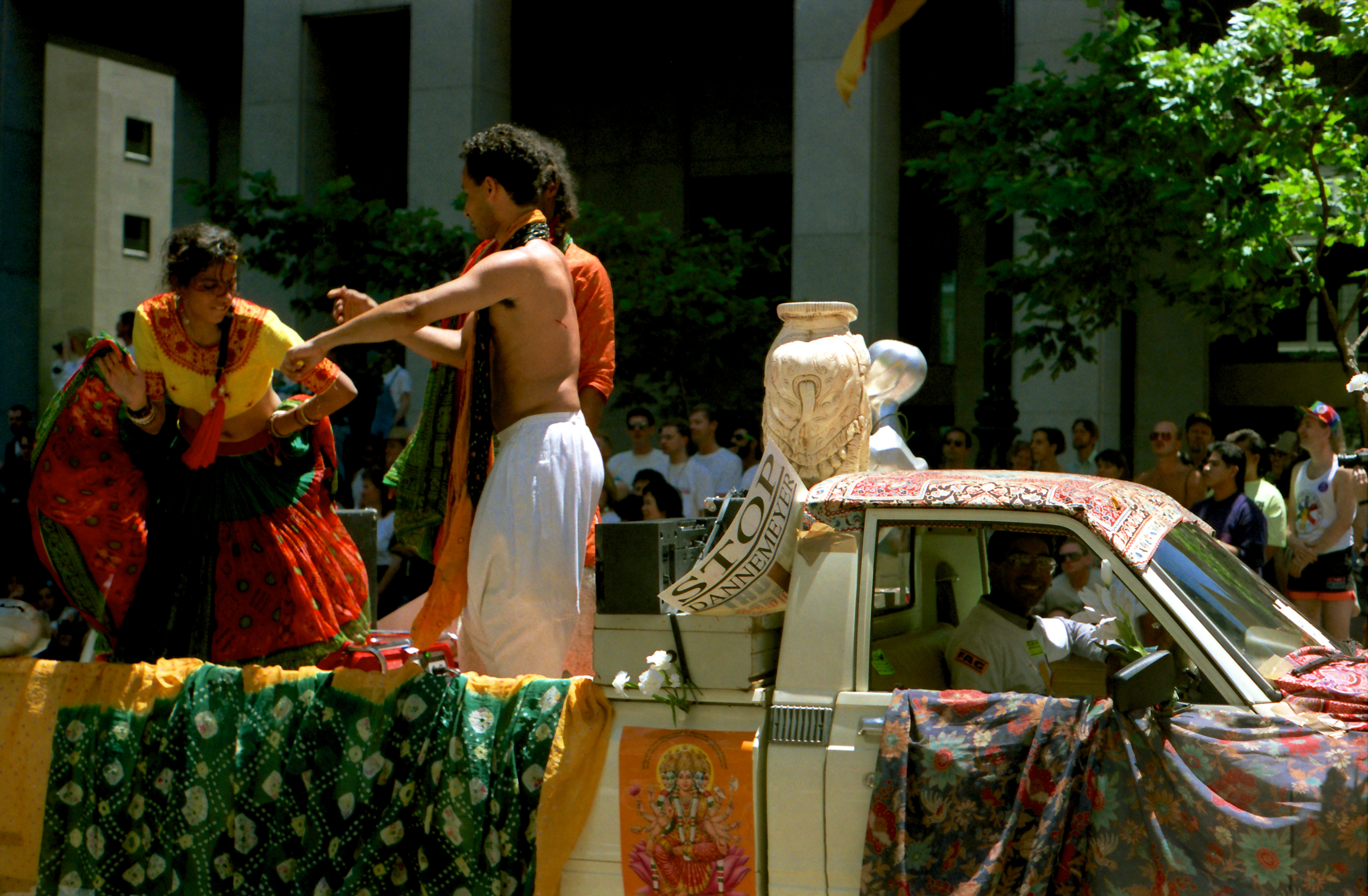
Trikone at the San Francisco Pride Parade in 1991

Arvind Kumar discusses the events that led to Trikone's founding in an interview with Outwords, a digital archive dedicated to capturing, preserving, and sharing the stories of LGBTQ+ elders. Arvind was born in Chhapra, Bihar, in India to a disciplinarian lawyer father with a philosophical outlook and a religious, social worker mother. Both of his parents dedicated time to their passions over child-rearing, so Arvind was raised by his uncle in Patna, Bihar. Arvind studied engineering at the prestigious Indian Institute of Technology (IIT) in Kanpur, and moved to the United States to study business administration at the University of Rochester. In 1982, he began working at Hewlett Packard in Palo Alto, California, where he was introduced to a more welcoming world of gay men of color. He found community by attending a weekly gay men's group at Stanford and reading the classified ads in the Advocate, the longest running LGBTQ magazine in the United States. Through these ads, he met Suvir Das, a fellow Indian gay man who had attended an IIT and was working in the Bay Area tech industry. Suvir Das and Arvind Kumar eventually founded Trikone together.

=== Trikone Newsletter ===
Arvind Kumar details the beginnings of the newsletter in his interview with Outwords. He began working on the newsletter after meeting his long-time partner, Ashok Jethanandi through an open letter published in The Advocate. At first, the newsletter was rudimentary: copy-and-pasted, marked up, photocopied, and stapled in the corner. Slowly, Kumar became more familiar with word processing, photocopying, and layout and began to publish the Trikone newsletter somewhat regularly, to an international audience. Kumar also eventually quit his job a year later to focus on Trikone and start India Currents, a freebie magazine detailing Indian cultural events in the Bay Area. He, along with his partner Ashok Jethanandi, and his cousin's wife Vandana Kumar began to expand the magazine, allowing it to become a forum through which South Asian people in the Bay Area could create community. This magazine involvement allowed the group to expand and establish a magazine office that also served as a base for Trikone magazine.

As Trikone expanded, Sandip Roy became a powerful transformative force in Trikone's publishing. Sandip Roy was from Calcutta and moved to the San Francisco Bay Area to pursue a job in the tech industry; he met Arvind and Ashok through Trikone. At the time, though the newsletter was supposed to be published bimonthly, it was only being pushed out 3 or 4 times a year. Sandip Roy took over and elevated the magazine into a glossy, stapled, formal magazine.

Running the newsletter over the years led to a tradition of mail processing days in the Trikone/India Currents office. Arvind Kumar recalls that a group of at least 10 Trikone members would take 3–5 hours to review the mail they received at their Palo Alto PO box and ensure that every piece of mail was thoughtfully responded to, even if it was a short note. At the end, they would enjoy a potluck dinner. Arvind recalls this as one of the happiest periods of his life: he felt welcomed and needed by a community of gay South Asian men for the first time in his life.

Trikone's magazine has left a legacy as the oldest South Asian LGBT magazine in the U.S., running from 1986 to 2014.

=== Archives ===
==== January 1995 ====
A page from the January 1995 edition of Trikone includes a section dedicated to South Asian queer people in the news. Shyam Selvadurai is mentioned as just having published his novel Funny Boy, a coming-of-age novel about a gay boy growing up in Sri Lanka in the midst of Sinhalese-Tamil political tensions. The Lahore Cricket Association is reported to have sent a threatening letter to a member calling him gay slurs, after which the member moved to the United States on asylum. At the time, he was living happily with his partner in Kansas City. The government referendum to allow hijras to select their gender on the ballot is also noted as a significant event, and Urvashi Vaid is noted as being recently including in Time's top 50 Americans with potentials to become a leader. Lastly, the magazine thanks Horizons Foundation and GAPA Community HIV project for the first donations to Trikone, funding that would help maintain and expand its activities.

==== January 1996 ====
A page from the October 1996 edition of Trikone includes Trikone specific news inserts, including a congratulations to Trikone member Hema Malini in the Miss Gay Asian Pacific Alliance (GAPA) contest in San Francisco on August 17. Additionally, this edition reports on the Society magazine article that Arvind Kumar notes in an oral history interview with Outwords was responsible for a dramatic expansion in Trikone readership and letters being sent to the PO box in Palo Alto, California. Trikone routinely reported on scholarly conversation, discussing a conversation on using examples of ancient homosexuality to corroborate the argument for equal rights. The Observer on June 15 discussed male Krishna devotees imagining themselves as female to better worship God. In response, an article in the Economic and Political Weekly stated that "natural is not always rational", criticizing ancient conditions in which homosexuality was recognized as not applicable to modern conditions. Trikone reports on the end of the debate, as Sharmila Rege critiques this article as homophobic, and defends equal rights as an extension of human empathy. Trikone also reports on various other news updates on Urvashi Vaid and books and film media in the public eye.

=== Events and Subgroups ===
In 2000 and 2006, Trikone produced DesiQ, a South Asian queer conference of international scope. In conjunction with this event, a film festival, QFilmistan, was also produced in September 2001. QFilmistan was the first South Asian LGBT film festival in North America, featuring feature films celebrating and documenting queer life. Films included the amitious and provocative Bomgay, the dramatic and deeply personal Summer in my Veins, and old Bollywood anthology collections like Desi Dykes and Divas: Hindi Film Clips.

The chapter has also expanded membership and developed a subgroup, Women of Trikone, a group for queer, female-identified people of South Asian descent in the San Francisco Bay Area. They operate through a private Google group.

Another subgroup, Parents of Trikone, operates as a community for LGBTQ+ parents of South Asian descent. They operate through a private Facebook group and Google group.

=== Press ===
Arvind Kumar details Society magazine coverage of Trikone's San Francisco Chapter in his interview with Outwords. A journalist for Society, a gossip magazine in Bombay, wrote a two page spread in the magazine about Trikone's founding and activities. Kumar remembers a photo of heartthrob Aditya Pancholi on the cover, a draw for gay readers. After the issue of society was published, letters began to be sent to Trikone's PO box in Palo Alto, California, en masse. These letters ranged from Pune and Patna to smaller towns. Trikone newsletters began to be sent out to India, Pakistan, and Bangladesh.

== Chicago Chapter ==
=== Founding ===
Trikone Chicago was originally founded by Ifti Nasim, a Muslim Pakistani poet. This organization eventually morphed into the now-defunct Sangat and the still-active later iteration of Trikone Chicago that was officially founded in 2007.

=== Events and Subgroups ===
One of Trikone Chicago's most famous events include their Jai Ho! parties, a queer Bollywood recurring party night that won "Best Sporadic Gay Dance Party" from the Chicago Reader. Jai Ho! parties include drag performances from local South Asian drag queens, especially those from Lawhore Vagistan, Kareem Khubchandani's drag alter ego. Jai Ho! profits allowed for Trikone to support both local activism and activism in South Asia.

Trikone Chicago also hosts monthly community potlucks that operate as safe spaces for the South Asian LGBTQ+ community, allowing for an informal setting where people can connect and support each other. These potlucks can be themed for holidays, for example, Eid.

=== Press ===
On April 15, 2017, the Windy City Times ran a small note about Trikone Chicago's event screening Jayan Cherian's Ka Bodyscapes, a film that was banned in India for "glorifying homosexuality." Following the movie, the organization held a Q&A session with the director.

On August 26, 2015, the Windy City Times ran a story on the organization as a safe haven for South Asian LGBTQ+ individuals. The article reported that Trikone was in its eight year and was progressing from hosting potlucks and Jai Ho! dance parties, to an organization involved in political activism. The organization had 20 people march in Chicago Pride that year and co-sponsored the National Queer Asian Pacific Islander Alliance conference.

== Scholarly Attention ==
=== From Khush List to Gay Bombay ===
Sandip Roy's seminal essay "From Khush List to Gay Bombay" on Trikone's development on the internet discusses the transnational nature of South Asian LGBTQ+ political activism. Trikone's very existence as one of the first LGBTQ+ South Asian websites (established in 1986, much before the World Wide Web became popular) had a powerful influence in making the South Asian gay movement visible. As one of the first editors of Trikone Magazine, Roy had a first row seat to the connections that Trikone's internet presence managed to foster across the world. However, Roy also asks questions about Trikone's large presence in the internet landscape, positioning itself as a voice on South Asian queer life while being physically situated in the West. He discusses the danger that while the internet crosses geographical barriers to form interpersonal relations, it may offer an idealized version of LGBTQ+ liberation that does not account for cultural differences.

=== Ishtyle ===
Kareem Khubchandani's book Ishtyle chronicles and analyzes Trikone's Chicago chapter as a material and affective site of political engagement. He argues that nightlife shapes participants into political subjects who engage with each other through debate, resistance, refusal, and consent.

He argues that queer South Asian global circuits are shaped by transnational labor routes, religious pilgrimages, tourism, asylum for better gender/HIV care, and others. Trikone Chicago's Jai Ho! Parties are part of a larger alternative party circuit for Desi queer people that includes Sholay Event's Desilicious parties in New York and the pub scene in Bangalore. Specifically drawing comparisons between Bangalore and Chicago's "second city" status, Khubchandani argues that the two activist and nightlife scenes depend on and draw from each other. Both cities' desi queer nightlife has been irrevocably influenced by the growth of the IT industry. Geographically, while Boystown has been known as the main spot for gay nightlife, much of Desi queer nightlife exists in the less desirable neighborhood of Uptown, largely because it is in closer proximity to Devon, a historically Indian-Pakistani area. Similarly, tech campuses in Bangalore brought men away from their families, allowing for men to exist in proximity with each other and have the privacy to engage in gay nightlife: clubs on the outskirts of the city but near the tech campuses could discretely be bought out to host these parties.

Finally, Khubchandani discusses Desi queerness as a uniquely transnational movement. Trikone's Chicago chapter amassed its large operating budget through hosting fundraisers like Jai Ho! parties. These proceeds have been redirected to support pride in India, specifically Bangalore. He argues that this supports Monisha Das Gupta's argument that South Asian LGBT activism is shaped by both intimate transnational connections and violent ruptures like colonialism, partition, and global labor currents.

=== A Lotus of Another Color ===
In a Lotus of Another Color, Rakesh Ratti touches on issues of feminism in Trikone, a group that was largely composed of gay men. Many members of Trikone assumed that the word "gay" would be a unifying term for South Asian gay and lesbian individuals. However, South Asian lesbians argued that it was presumptuous to include that implication without any lesbian South Asian members, and Rakesh Ratti explains the culturally-influenced patriarchy that still permeates South Asian gay men's thoughts and actions, positing that it should be accepted and encouraged for lesbians to create their own identity-based spaces.

=== Gay and Lesbian Movement in India ===
Trikone's archiving of key LGBTQ+ South Asian history has been used to create larger bodies of work, like Sherry Joseph's encyclopedic article "Gay and Lesbian Movement in India." This work draws on Trikone's articles on references to women loving women in Indian epics like the Mahabharata and the Ramayana as well as their piece on the first South Asian newsletter on homosexuality, Anamika.

=== South Asian LGBTQ+ Health ===
Sharma et al. 2023 from the University of Michigan was an aggregated survey on HIV and STI testing prevalence in the South Asian gay, bisexual, and other men who have sex with men in the United States. The participant base drew from several online South Asian LGBTQ+ groups including Trikone (Atlanta, Bay Area, and Chicago Chapters), MASALA Boston, and Khush (DC and ATX chapters). The findings highlighted gaps in HIV and STI prevention efforts.

== See also ==
- List of LGBT organizations
