= India Currents =

Indian-American magazine

- Editor: Meera Kymal
- Former editors: Srishti Prabha, Preeti Hay, Nirupama Vaidyanathan, Jaya Padmanabhan, Geetika Pathania Jain, Vidya Pradhan, Ragini Tharoor Srinivasan, Arvind Kumar, Ashok Jethanandani, Vandana Kumar
- Frequency: Monthly
- Publisher: Vandana Kumar
- Unpaid circulation: 32,000
- Founded: 1987; 38 years ago
- First issue: April 1987; 37 years ago
- Country: United States
- Based in: San Jose, California
- Language: English
- ISSN: 0896-095X

India Currents is, according to the San Jose Mercury News, "the oldest and largest Indian-American magazine on the West Coast" of the United States.

== Overview ==
Fully digital today, it earlier offered Northern California, Southern California, and Washington, D.C. editions, as well as online content. In 2011 it employed 6 full-time employees and distributed 32,000 free copies. In 2015, it reached 172,000 readers every month.

It was launched in the San Francisco Bay Area in April 1987 by editor Arvind Kumar and publisher Ashok Jethanandani, with Vandana Kumar, who was editor in 2003.

India Currents and its writers have received a variety of awards, including six awards at the 2014 Greater Bay Area Journalism Awards.
