= Binyamin Lau =

Israeli rabbi and activist (born 1961)

Rabbi Dr. Benyamin Lau
- בנימין לאו (Hebrew)
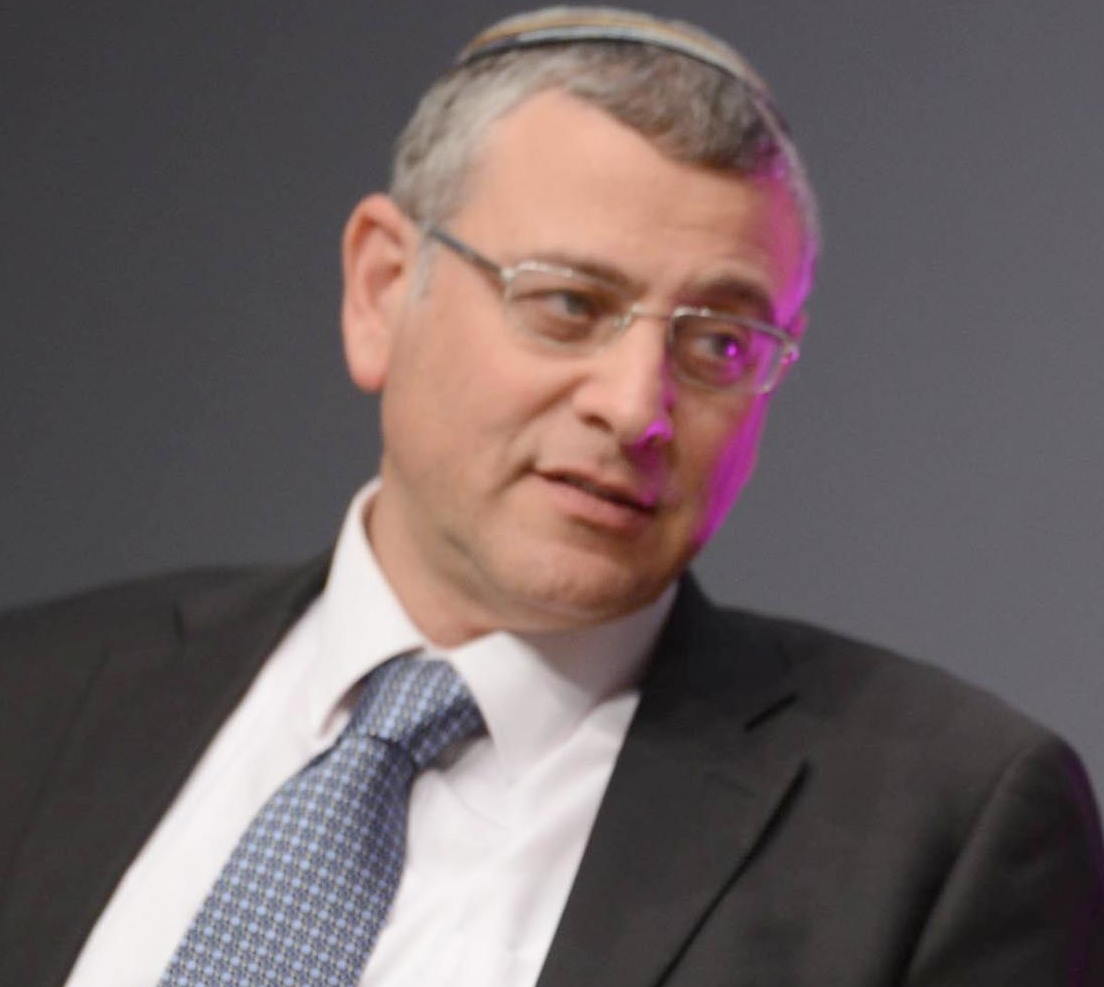

Personal life
- Born: Binyamin Tzvi Lau Tel Aviv, Israel
- Occupation: Rabbi, community leader

Religious life
- Religion: Judaism

Jewish leader
- Position: Rosh Yeshiva
- Yeshiva: Beit Midrash for Social Justice at Beit Morasha
- Organisation: Center for Judaism and Society at Beit Morasha
- Residence: Jerusalem, Israel

Binyamin Tzvi (Benny) Lau, (Hebrew: בנימין צבי (בני) לאו; born 20 October 1961) is an Israeli rabbi, community leader, activist, author, and public speaker who lives in Jerusalem. He is the head of 929: Tanach B'yachad and headed the Kehillat Ramban synagogue in Jerusalem for 18 years. He is also the head of the "Human Rights and Judaism in Action Project" at the Israel Democracy Institute. Previously, he was the director of a number of programs at Beit Morasha in Jerusalem, including their Center for Judaism and Society, their Institute for Social Justice, and their Israel Institute for Conversion Policy. He is also a well-known writer, and makes frequent appearances in the media.

== Biography ==
Lau was born in Tel Aviv to Naphtali Lau-Lavie, the older brother of former Chief Rabbi of Israel Rabbi Israel Meir Lau, and Joan (née Lunzer). He is a second great-grandson of the scholar Eliezer Liepman Philip Prins (1835–1915). Lau's mother, a sister of Jack Lunzer, was born in England to a prominent family known for preserving the legacy and school of thought of Rabbi Samson Raphael Hirsch. Lau's brother Rabbi Amichai Lau-Lavie founded Storahtelling, a NYC-based Jewish ritual theater company, and Lab/Shul, a non-denominational Jewish congregation.

Lau grew up in Ramat Gan, and was a student in the Segula School in Bnei Brak. Afterwards, he attended Netiv Meir High School in Jerusalem, and participated in the Bnei Akiva Youth Movement. After he completed his high-school studies, he went on to learn in Yeshivat Har Etzion, and was drafted into the Israel Defense Forces in the Golani Brigade.

Lau teaches at Beit Morasha in Jerusalem, and serves as the head of the Beit Midrash program, alongside Rabbi Dr. Yehuda Brandes. In 2000, he established the Beit Midrash for Women at Beit Morasha, and led that program for five years.

In 2000, Lau moved to Jerusalem, and has been serving as the community rabbi at Ramban Synagogue in Katamon since 2002.

In 2005, he established the Beit Midrash for Social Justice together with the organization B’Maaglei Tzedek, a non-profit organization that he helped establish, with the goal to imbue issues in Israeli society with Torah learning. He also publishes extensively in national newspapers, scholarly journals, weekly Shabbat pamphlets, and has authored numerous books.

During the years 2007–2009, Lau had a Friday column in the Culture and Literature section of Ha'aretz newspaper. He appears every Friday on Israel's Channel 1 TV on a program for the weekly portion of the Torah, together with Avi Raht. He also frequently appears on interviews in the media.

Lau lectures widely on halakha and social justice at Beit Morasha's Beren College, and served as the rabbi of the Ramban Synagogue in Jerusalem until 2019. In October 2020, Lau published "Couplehood and Relationships for Members of the LGBTQ+ Community." The document was intended to bring about a process of integration for members of the LGBTQ community into the wider Orthodox community.

== Published works ==
- The Sages, vol. I: The Second Temple Period (2010), Maggid Books. ISBN 978 159 264 2458
- The Sages, vol. II: From Yavneh to the Bar Kokhva Revolt (2011), Maggid Books. ISBN 978 159 264 2465
- The Sages, vol. III: The Galilean Period (2013), Maggid Books. ISBN 978 159 264 2472
- Jeremiah: The Fate of a Prophet (2011), Maggid Books ISBN 978 159 264 1949
- Access of People with Guide Dogs to the Western Wall Prayer Plaza
- Marriage in Sign Language
