= Amichai Lau-Lavie =

American rabbi and activist

Amichai Yehuda Lau-Lavie
- עמיחי לאו-לביא
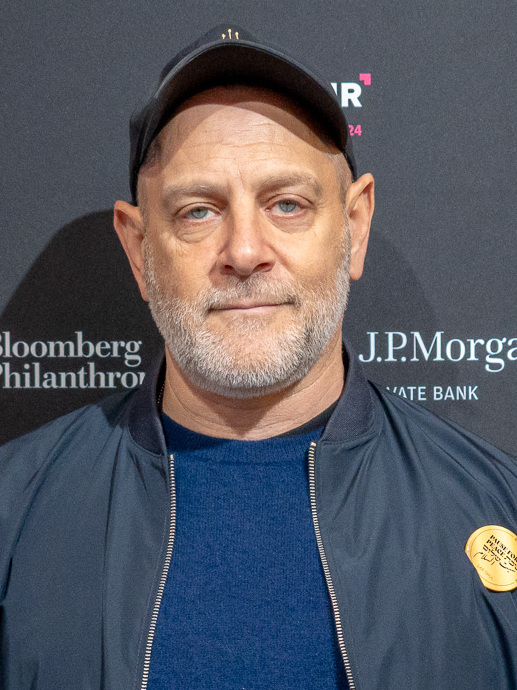
- Lau-Lavie in 2024
- Born: 22 April 1969 (age 57)

Rabbi Amichai Yehuda Lau-Lavie (Hebrew: עמיחי לאו-לביא; born April 22, 1969) is a social entrepreneur, human rights activist and LGBT, Conservative rabbi, founder and spiritual leader of the Lab/Shul community in New York.

== Biography ==
Lau-Lavie's family has an extended personal connection to the rabbinate. His family has been said to "span thirty-seven consecutive generations of rabbis, dating back to the eleventh century." His father, Naphtali Lau-Lavie, was Israel's consul-general, who was appointed in 1981, and primarily served in New York City. His uncle, Yisrael Meir Lau, was the Ashkenazi Chief Rabbi of Israel from 1993 to 2003.

Lau-Lavie is the fourth son of Naphtali Lau-Lavie and Joan Lau-Lavie (from Lunzer). His brother, Binyamin Lau, heads the 929: Bible Together project. His cousin, David Lau, was the Ashkenazi Chief Rabbi in Israel until 2024.

Lau-Lavie grew up in Ramat Gan, Bnei Brak, New York and Jerusalem. He graduated from Hartman High School for Boys in Jerusalem in 1986. He continued his studies at the Har Etzion Yeshiva, and enlisted in the Israel Defense Forces in 1987 as part of the integration program of Yeshivat HaKibbutz HaDati (Ein Tzurim), where he served as a paratrooper, as a combat medic, and as a medic instructor.

He worked in the field of nonformal education in the Gesher organization, institutes of Jewish Zionist education, and the Beit Midrash Elul in Jerusalem.

Lau-Lavie was exposed without his knowledge as being gay "without consent, by the press", in 1997. This led him to leave Israel for New York City.

In 1999, he founded Storahtelling, a ceremonial theater group that employs the ancient tradition of Torah reading alternating with a translation in the local language, and renews the traditional Torah reading ceremony as a social political theater. In 2009, Lau-Lavie founded Lab/Shul, an egalitarian and experienced Jewish community laboratory in New York, which he still heads (as of 2021).

Lau-Lavie completed his undergraduate studies in 2010 in New York.

In 2016, he completed his rabbinical studies and a master's degree in education at the Conservative movement's Jewish Theological Seminary of America in New York.

== Activities and views ==
In 1999, he founded the theater group StorahTelling, an organization that took on the challenge of giving a new interpretation to Jewish identity through the Torah. The name connects the words "story", "Torah", and "Haggadah". The organization's mission is to take the stories of the Torah and show that they are relevant in the 21st century.

About a decade later, in 2009, Lau-Lavie established an egalitarian and experimental Jewish community in New York under the name Lab/Shul—a combination of lab and synagogue (shul). The home page of the community website reads: "Lab/Shul accepts people of all races, religions, beliefs, gender expressions, sexual orientations, countries of origin, ages, abilities, families and shades—with an open heart."

=== Resident alien status ===
In 2017, Lau-Lavie published a position paper called "JOY", which is based on a proposal to reinterpreting "resident alien" (ger toshav) status for marriages of Jews with members of other religions, who do not convert but choose to adopt Jewish elements in their relationship. Lau-Lavie explains the need his proposed changes in the context of maintaining Judaism: "A couple comes to me—the woman is Jewish and the man isn't. They want to get married but he doesn't want to convert. They want to be part of our community, to raise their children as Jews. If I tell them 'no,' we've lost them and their children, and that's it."

=== Conversion therapy ===
In an interview with Glatz in July 2019, he went against the words of the Minister of Education, Rafi Peretz, regarding conversion therapies. Lau-Lavie said "there are people whose conversion therapies are their choice, but as the Minister of Education in Israel of 2019, this is an opinion that does not reflect who we are as a people, as a public and as a Jew."

In an opinion piece he published at the time in WDG, his words were even sharper when he said, "When the Minister of Education of the State of Israel preaches the success of conversion therapies—in ignorance, malice and out of a conservative and dark position—he bears responsibility for the blood of my brothers in Israel and in the world who crave self-love and love for others and instead receive a cruel message."

=== In Media ===
Between the years 1996–2005, Lau-Lavie participated in reality shows produced by Rafik Yedidya, "Across Israel" (1996), "Cosmic Optimism" (1999), which aired on Channel 2; and "The Eleventh Commandment" (2004) which aired on Channel 10.

On June 23, 2021, Lau-Lavie participated in Israel's first television LGBTI Pride program on Israel's Network 13.

Lau-Lavie is the subject of the 2024 documentary film Sabbath Queen. The director Sandi Simcha DuBowski followed Lau-Lavie for about two decades.
