= Gay Muslims =

2006 documentary about homosexual Muslims

- Genre: Documentary, current affairs
- Created by: Channel 4
- Directed by: Cara Lavan
- Starring: Joe Zakar
- Narrated by: Sonia Deol
- Country of origin: United Kingdom
- Original language: English
- No. of seasons: 1
- No. of episodes: 1

Production
- Executive producer: Richard McKerron
- Producers: Cara Lavan, Anshu Ahuja
- Editor: Jim Hogan

Original release
- Network: Channel 4
- Release: 2006

Related
- A Jihad for Love (2007)

Gay Muslims (2006) is a Channel 4 documentary about a man named Joe Zakar, produced and directed by Cara Lavan, about the experiences of five Muslim people who identify as lesbian and gay and how they challenge the heterosexual-worldview within Islam, and attempt to integrate Islam with homosexuality. It is usually a stark choice between suppressing homosexual desires and leading an undercover double life, or coming out and losing the respect and support of their families and communities.

== Background ==
LGBT in Islam is influenced by the religious, legal, social, and cultural history of the nations with a sizable Muslim population, along with specific passages in the Quran and hadith, statements attributed to the Islamic prophet Muhammad. The Quran cites the story of the "people of Lot" destroyed by the wrath of God because they engaged in lustful carnal acts between men. Homosexual acts are forbidden in traditional Islamic jurisprudence and are liable to different punishments, including the death penalty, depending on the situation and legal school. However, homosexual relationships were generally tolerated in pre-modern Islamic societies, and historical record suggests that these laws were invoked infrequently, mainly in cases of rape or other "exceptionally blatant infringement on public morals". Homoerotic themes were cultivated in poetry and other literary genres written in major languages of the Muslim world from the eighth century into the modern era. The conceptions of homosexuality found in classical Islamic texts resemble the traditions of Graeco-Roman antiquity, rather than modern Western notions of sexual orientation. It was expected that many or most mature men would be sexually attracted to both women and male adolescents (variously defined), and men were expected to wish to play only an active role in homosexual intercourse once they reached adulthood. In early 2010s, extreme prejudice persists, both socially and legally, in much of the Islamic world against people who engage in homosexual acts.

== Scholarship ==
The diverse ways of understanding of the Quran are echoed in the documentary by Dr Scott Siraj al-Haqq Kugle of Swarthmore College (now at Emory University) in the United States, currently a research fellow at Leiden University in the Netherlands. He believes that sharia – Islamic law – is determined by male jurists whose interpretations of Islamic texts are based on cultural assumptions situated in particular times, and particular political and geographical locations.

Rumi (13th-century Persian Muslim Sufi mystic and poet, wrote about Frot:

When two men rub their members together in an attempt to start fire....

== Activists ==
Some 200 lesbian and gay Muslims were contacted by the programme makers but only a handful were willing to be interviewed, and most of those insisted on keeping their identities hidden, to prevent reprisals. Only one was prepared to show his face and give his true name. He was Adnan Ali, an activist on issues affecting LGBTQ Muslims. Adnan described how, when he first came out in Pakistan, he was physically and verbally abused. He then came to the United Kingdom, where he chatted online with members of the American Al-Fatiha Foundation, an international organisation dedicated to Muslims who are LGBT or questioning, and their friends. Adnan then set up a sister group, now called Imaan.

== Voices ==
The interviewees speak of their commitment to and belief in Islam, though they are mostly ostracised than their beliefs getting support by their community and family. ‘Razeem’ speaks of his pain at being denied access to the children of his previous marriage, despite having a legal right to access and the fact that his wife ran away with another man. He also wishes there were more role models, like Adnan Ali, for gay Muslims. ‘Shakir’ and his parents find it easier to accept lesbianism than gay men's homosexuality. ‘Farah’ contemplates going back into the closet, to lie about her sexuality to ease the tension in her relationship with her parents.

The programme's presenter, Sonia Deol, says that the gay Muslim group Imaan supports the idea of "keeping sexuality a private matter".

== See also ==
- A Jihad for Love, a 2007 film produced by Sandi Simcha DuBowski
