= Alei Siach =

Israeli nonprofit organization

Alei Siach (Hebrew: עלי שיח) is an Israeli nonprofit organization serving children and adults with intellectual and physical disabilities founded in 1990. Alei Siach provides residential care, vocational training, employment opportunities, marital assistance and social activities, and promotes integration within the broader community.

== History ==
Alei Siach was founded in 1990 by Rabbi Chaim Perkal after his daughter Rivky was born with special needs. He aimed to create a high level of support and care for people living with special needs in a home-like environment, within a community-based framework.

Alei Siach has grown from a grassroots project to one of the largest organizations in Israel serving people with disabilities and their families. Alei Siach programs benefit more than 1240 individuals annually.

The organization works in coordination with the Jerusalem Municipality, Ministry of Health, Ministry of Welfare and Social Services, and the National Insurance Institute.

Alei Siach supports people who are living with autism, Down syndrome, developmental delays, physical handicaps, and other special needs. The organization has been publicly praised by Israeli President Reuven Rivlin. Rivlin is a member of the Friends of Alei Siach Committee along with Chief Rabbi of Tel Aviv Yisrael Meir Lau and Member of Knesset Nir Barkat.

== Programming ==
The organization is based on an inclusive, community-based model. Alei Siach provides assisted living apartments for some 350 people with physical and intellectual disabilities, vocational training and employment assistant, medical care, emotional and occupational therapy, and enrichment classes in computers, gardening, and more.

Alei Siach's Ofek Marriage Program is an initiative that supports married couples with special needs. Alei Siach rents an apartment for the couple and provides them with a monthly stipend for living expenses, periodic check-ins by counselors, and ongoing couple's therapy.
