= Artist corporation =

Type of limited liability corporation entity

An artist corporation (or A-Corps or artist company) is a type of limited liability company (LLC) that is specifically designed for artists and creative professionals. This type of company contains legal protections for artists to retains 51% artistic ownership of assets that aren't explicitly designed with other LLCs or corporation structures if or when the corporation is dissolved.

== History ==
In 2025, Yancey Strickler, a co-founder of the crowd-funding platform Kickstarter, shared the idea of the Artist Company at a TED Talk. Strickler differentiates A-Corps from other limited liability companies (LLCs) because the holding company can own the collection, album, or creative commercial business with other creatives or investors. Strickler said he chose Colorado to help codify this structure because he was advised to by arts advocates like the Sundance Institute’s Eugene Hernandez.

On June 2, 2026, Colorado passed Senate Bill 133 (SB26-133) into law, which creates a new type of LLC in the state called an Artist Company. The bill stipulates that the art can be treated as a capital contribution rather than a generic asset. The bill enables equity sharing similar to an S corporation, but the tax and liability protection of an LLC. The Artist Company also describes a mechanism whereby 51% of artistic ownership is required to file for the organization with the Secretary of State. This mechanism stipulates that in the event that company is dissolved, the rights to the artistic work, its royalties, and revenue would go to the member who assigned, licensed, or created the artistic work.

== Motivations ==
There are examples of artists' situations that may warrant the unique qualities of an A Corp. A Denver-based artist has independently developed and taught a guided meditation and abstract painting classes at the Denver Art Museum for five years as of 2026. However, with plans to license their work, the artist is concerned for the ownership of their intellectual property and its relationship with the museum gives its history and connection to the museum. Similarly, a British multimedia artist and co-curator of an exhibition at the Clyfford Still Museum in Denver is considering options for retaining and growing their artistic project for licensing instead of one-off one-time fees, but he is eager to license the idea instead.
