= A Sinner in Mecca =

- Official Poster
- Directed by: Parvez Sharma
- Produced by: Parvez Sharma; Alison Amron; Andrew Herwitz
- Cinematography: Parvez Sharma; Husain Akbar
- Edited by: Alison Amron; Sajid Akbar
- Music by: Sajid Akbar; M.E. Manning
- Release dates: April 29, 2015 (Hot Docs Canadian International Documentary Festival); September 4, 2015 (Cinema Village, New York)
- Running time: 79 minutes
- Countries: United States; Saudi Arabia; India
- Languages: English, Arabic, Urdu, Hindi

A Sinner in Mecca is a 2015 documentary film from director Parvez Sharma (A Jihad for Love). The film chronicles Sharma's Hajj pilgrimage to Mecca, Saudi Arabia as an openly gay Muslim. The film premiered at the 2015 Hot Docs Canadian International Documentary Festival to critical acclaim as well as negative controversies. The film opened in theaters in the US on September 4, 2015, and is a New York Times Critics' Pick.

== Synopsis ==
A Sinner in Mecca enters a world that has been forbidden to non-Muslims for 14 centuries. Parvez Sharma documents his journey on an iPhone and two smuggled tiny cameras. On the streets of Mecca he joins 4 million other Muslim pilgrims from different traditions of Islam, fulfilling a lifelong calling for Hajj.

The film examines parts of the ideology that governs today’s Islamic extremism and what it has in common with Saudi Arabia’s Wahabi Islam. In the movie the filmmaker, an openly gay Muslim man, tries to find his own place within an Islam he has always known, an Islam that he believes bears no resemblance to Wahabi Islam.

In the movie the filmmaker sees himself as a longing Muslim, labeled an infidel, wondering if he can finally secure his place within this religion that condemns him.

== Production ==
A Sinner in Mecca is co-produced with Arte and ZDF in Europe.

The film is set in Saudi Arabia, India, and the United States.

== Festivals ==
A Sinner in Mecca's European premiere was at the UK's Sheffield Doc/Fest where it was nominated for a Grand Jury Award. Additional security was provided. The film won the Grand Jury Award for Best Documentary at Outfest in Los Angeles.

A Sinner in Mecca premiered at the 2015 Hot Docs Canadian International Documentary Festival and had a limited US theatrical release beginning on September 4, 2015. The film played at several international festivals including CPH Dox in November 2015 and IDFA in November 2015. It won the Best Documentary Award at Image+Nation in Montreal in December, 2015. The film was among those in consideration for an Academy Award on October 23, 2015.

== Controversy ==
The world premiere at Hot Docs required added security in response to online hate mail and death threats against the director.

The online abuse and death threats around the film continued through its theatrical release and its debut on iTunes, Netflix and television channels.

The film was initially slated to be screened at the 26th Singapore International Film Festival. Due to the country's conservative policies, permission to screen the film was withheld at the last minute.

== Critical reception ==
The New York Times named the movie a Critics' Pick and said “Mr. Sharma has created a swirling, fascinating travelogue and a stirring celebration of devotion. We emerge from his film more enlightened.” Critic Alan Scherstuhl in The Village Voice said “Next time you hear politicians or right-wing broadcasters asking why 'moderate' Muslims don't denounce terrorism, show them this movie.” In a story on the film, The Washington Post called the film “Complex" and "Revelatory". In a feature about the film, Yahoo News called the film “A Rebuke of Saudi Arabia”.

The film received universal acclaim upon its 2015 Hot Docs premiere. The Hollywood Reporter called it “Wrenching... gritty... surreal and transcendent; Visceral and Abstract... a true act of courage and hope.” The Guardian wrote, “With poetic simplicity... a delicately personal story and a call to action.” OUT Magazine described it as “Brave... An unprecedented exploration of Islam.” Indiewire wrote, “Powerful, Illuminating ... a remarkable examination of contemporary Islam.” BBC Persian called it “Shocking and Courageous”. Screen Daily referred to the film as ““Unprecedented... Surreal.” The Toronto Star called it “A deeply personal film about faith and forgiveness.” Scroll.in said, “Deeply personal ... High Drama ... A protest against Saudi Arabia”. Anne Thompson in Thompson on Hollywood wrote, “The film combines the political, the personal and the spiritual in a remarkable way”. It has a score of 76% on Metacritic and a score of 85% on Rotten Tomatoes.

In a feature on the film, The Daily News said it was “(A) death defying religious journey.” In its review of the film, The Daily News said “Compelling... takes its audience where no film has gone before”

Christianity Today says the film is “Critical but not mocking”.

Out magazine published an op-ed about Parvez Sharma's Hajj.

Jahan News, an Iranian news agency, denounced the filmmaker for promoting “the disgusting act of homosexuality” and labeled the film "an attack on Islam."

== Awards ==
Grand Jury Award for Best Documentary at Outfest in Los Angeles.

Won a RapidLion for Best Documentary Feature, 2016

Movies that Matter, The Hague, 2016

Best Documentary, Image+Nation Film Festival, Montreal 2016

Best Documentary, Reeling Film Festival

== See also ==
- List of lesbian, gay, bisexual or transgender-related films of 2015
