= Fedor Mikhailichenko =

Fedor Fedorovich Mikhailichenko (Russian: Фёдор Фёдорович Михайличенко; 1927—1993) was a Soviet Righteous Among the Nations. As a prisoner in the concentration camp of Buchenwald, he saved the life of a small Jewish boy Yurchik (born in 1937), who later became the Chief Ashkenazi rabbi of Israel, Israel Meir Lau.

== At Buchenwald ==
In 1942, as the Nazis occupied the city of Rostov-on-Don, then 14-year-old Fedor Mikhailichenko was unable to be evacuated with the rest of his naval school due to sickness. Denounced by a neighbour, he was sent to forced labour in Germany.

Aged 16, Mikhailichenko was arrested for robbery by the Gestapo and sent to the concentration camp Buchenwald in the 8th children's block, where 300 children aged 10 to 17 years were imprisoned. In January 1945, a 7-year-old Polish Jew, Yurchik (Lyolik), arrived to Buchenwald and Mikhailichenko, at the time only 18 years old, helped him to survive by stealing potatoes from the Germans to feed the young boy. After the liberation of Buchenwald (April 11, 1945), the American administration did not allow Fedor to adopt Yurchik, and the two would never meet again.

== After the War ==
After returning to his homeland, Fedor Mikhailichenko entered the Rostov-on-Don physical culture technical school, and then at the Geological and Geographical Department of Rostov State University (RSU, now SFedU). He became a leading researcher at VNIGRIUGOL and defended his thesis.

The title of the righteous man of the world was awarded to him on January 25, 2009. In August 2009 in Jerusalem (Israel) in the memorial complex Yad Vashem the name of Feodor Mikhailichenko was added to the honorable list of Righteous Among the Nations — people of different nationalities who saved Jews during the Second World War. Mikhailichenko became the 164th righteous man from Russia.

== Death ==
Mikhailichenko died on September 18, 1993, in Rostov-on-Don.
