= A Sinner in Mecca: A Gay Muslim's Hajj of Defiance =

2017 memoir by Parvez Sharma

A Sinner in Mecca, A Gay Muslim's Hajj of Defiance
- First edition
- Author: Parvez Sharma
- Language: English
- Genre: Memoir, Islam, Daesh, Politics, Islamic History
- Published: August 15, 2017
- Publisher: BenBella Books
- ISBN: 1944648372

A Sinner in Mecca: A Gay Muslim's Hajj of Defiance is the first book by Parvez Sharma, released on August 15, 2017, by publisher BenBella Books. The book focuses on Wahhabism, Daesh, Saudi Arabia, and the position of Islam in the Indian sub-continent. Sharma calls the book the final product of his "Islam Trilogy". The author recorded an audiobook version of this book for Tantor Media on December 14, 2017. In 2018, Parvez Sharma's book, A Sinner In Mecca: A Gay Muslim's Hajj of Defiance was nominated for a Lambda Literary Award in the category of Gay Memoir/Biography and received Honorable Mention in the LGBT Nonfiction category for the 2017 Foreword INDIES.

== About ==
In the book Sharma sharply veers away from the subject of the film of the same name and instead focuses on Wahhabi Islam, Daesh, Saudi Arabia, the Indian sub-continent and more. Sharma has called the book as the final product of his "Islam Trilogy" in various interviews.

=== Publisher ===
The book was released by a U.S. based publisher from Dallas, Texas, called BenBella Books. They declared it one of their front-list titles. In 2017, the publisher said they had 14 New York Times bestsellers on its list of titles.

Audio-book publisher Tantor Media released an author-voiced audio-book on December 14, 2017.

== Author History ==
He started writing as an undergraduate at Presidency College, Calcutta in India, for the newspapers The Telegraph, The Statesman and The Business Standard. He contributed to US publications like Trikone.

He has written about India, Islam and U.S. Politics on Huffington Post, The Guardian, The Daily Beast and CNN-IBN (now known as CNN-News18).

== External Reviews ==
The book has mixed reviews in the media.

The Guardian newspaper says, "Written by a man with a deep knowledge of Islamic history; with courage and fierce emotion." It adds, "Parvez Sharma is a proud gay Muslim whose first film, A Jihad For Love, was the first ever made about Islam and homosexuality. It made him the subject of death threats throughout the Arab world."

LGBT website Towleroad said, "This Gay Muslim Risked His Life to Reveal a Side of Islam Most Have Never Seen" and added in its review that the book gives "perspective on extremists and religion, but as a glass to view the world here in the United States, the challenges felt by the Muslim community, and the oppressive weight of the Trump administration".

Publishers Weekly said "Ultimately, the work is fascinating but flawed, with many of its important topics tackled haphazardly; more reflective insight into Sharma’s own faith journey, for example, might have tied the narrative together more closely."

On Tantor Media, where the book has been given four and a half stars out of five a reviewer says, “Given the perception that the Middle East is largely hostile to the LGBTQ community, Parvez Sharma’s spiritual memoir A Sinner in Mecca is shocking in its clarity and candor.”
