= Yancey Strickler =

Entrepreneur and author

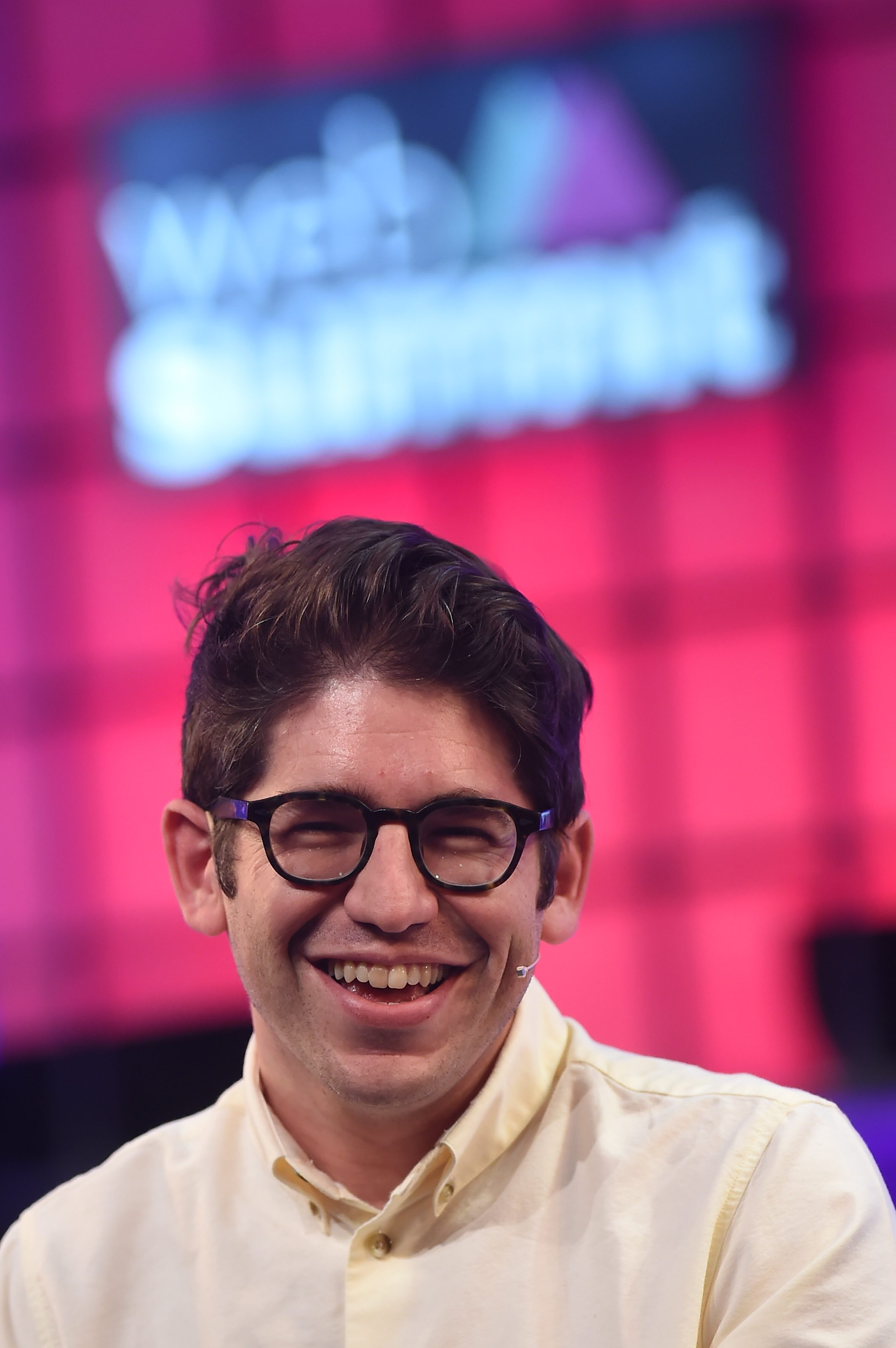
- Born: November 4, 1978 (age 47); Virginia
- Education: William & Mary
- Occupations: Writer and Entrepreneur
- Known for: Co-founded Kickstarter, The Creative Independent, Metalabel, Artist Corporations
- Website: Official website

Yancey Strickler (born November 4, 1978) is an American author, entrepreneur, and former music critic. He co-founded Kickstarter, a funding platform for creative projects.

== Biography ==
Strickler was born in rural Virginia. While attending Giles High School he became interested in journalism and earned an internship with The Roanoke Times New River Current. He attended College of William & Mary where he majored in English and Literary and Cultural Studies. After graduating from William and Mary, he moved to New York City where he worked as a music journalist for publications including Spin, The Village Voice, and the website eMusic.

== Projects ==
In 2009, he co-founded Kickstarter, a funding platform for creative projects. He served as its CEO from 2014 through 2017. In 2015, he co-founded The Creative Independent, a source of emotional and practical wisdom for creative people.

In 2021, he cofounded Metalabel, a platform that helps creative people release and sell work together in small groups. Strickler wrote that the project was inspired by indie record labels and projects like The Royal Society where groups of individuals came together around a shared purpose. The project has functioned as a creative label itself, releasing zines, books, and manifestos by the group, as well as an internet platform used by Brian Eno, Shantell Martin, The Creative Independent, and others to release their work.

In 2025, he introduced Artist Corporations, or A-Corps, a new corporate structure intended to help artists, creators, and creative groups more easily formulate legal entities, access funding and health insurance, and create equity and ownership for their practices and work. The idea was first introduced at the TED conference in Vancouver, Canada, in April 2025.

== Writing ==
In 2019, he wrote This Could Be Our Future, a Penguin Random House book about building a society that looks beyond profit as its core organizing principle. The book also describes a decision-making framework that Yancey invented called Bentoism, which segments self-interest into four-dimensions: Now Me, Future Me, Now Us, and Future Us.

In 2019, he published "The Dark Forest Theory of the Internet", an essay originally sent to a newsletter list that went viral. The piece observed that as the internet became a more dangerous place, people were shifting into dark forests — "non-indexed, non-optimized, and non-gamified" spaces like group chats, podcasts, and newsletters — where they could communicate safely without pressure.

In 2024, Strickler turned the essay into a book, The Dark Forest Anthology of the Internet, that included pieces from Venkatesh Rao, Maggie Appleton, Joshua Citarella, Caroline Busta, Lil Internet, and Leith Benkhedda, who together formed a new publishing group, the Dark Forest Collective. The group published a second book in 2025, Antimemetics by Nadia Asparahouva, for which Strickler served as editor.
