= Sandi Simcha DuBowski =

American film producer

Sandi Simcha Dubowski
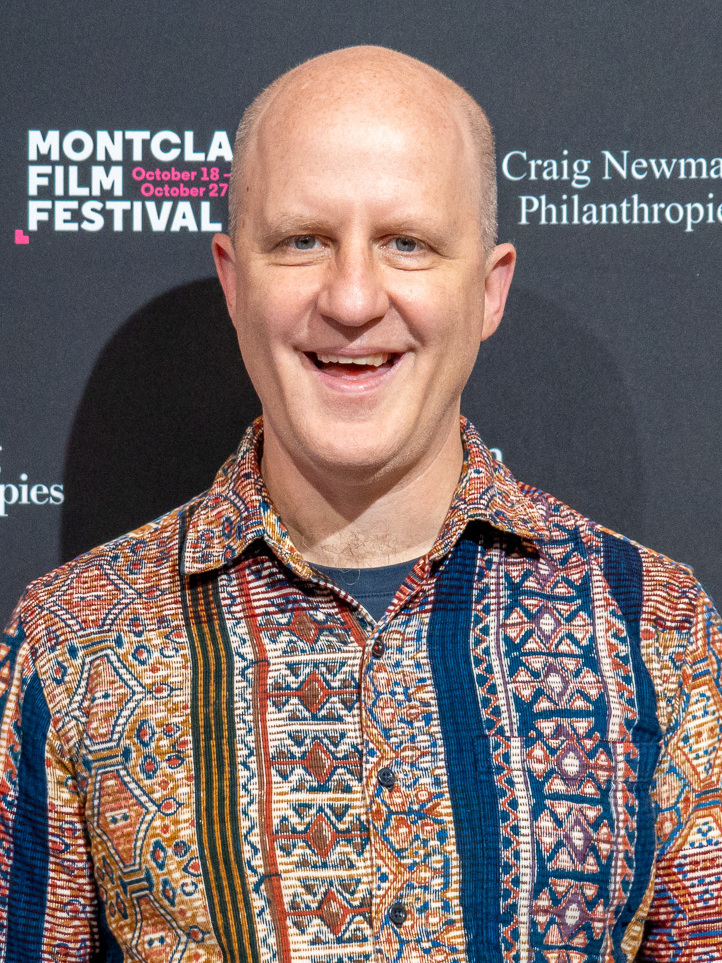
- Dubowski in 2024
- Born: 16 September 1970 (age 56); New York City
- Education: Harvard University
- Occupation: Filmmaker
- Known for: Gay rights films

Sandi Simcha DuBowski is an American director and producer. Best known for his work on the intersection of LGBT people and their religion, DuBowski directed the 2001 documentary Trembling Before G-d and is the producer of Parvez Sharma's documentary A Jihad for Love (formerly known as In the Name of Allah) (2007).

== Personal life ==
DuBowski was born in Brooklyn in 1970. He was raised in Conservative Judaism.

DuBowski attended Hunter College High School in New York City, during which he was selected to participate in Camp Rising Sun, the Louis August Jonas Foundation's international summer scholarship program. In 1992, DuBowski graduated magna cum laude from Harvard University. As an undergraduate, he received two Ford Program for Undergraduate Research grants for his work on homosexuality in Hollywood and independent film.

He lives and works in New York City.

== Work ==
Before beginning full-length films, DuBowski worked for Planned Parenthood as a research associate for nearly three years, creating videos on the Christian Right and anti-abortion movement. In 1996 he produced Missionaries Form Militias, documenting anti-abortion leader Rev. Matt Trewhella calling for the formation of armed militias. It was screened for Attorney General Janet Reno and federal law enforcement officials, following the murder of abortion provider Dr. Bayard Britton. An excerpt was run on CBS News, was reported by publications including The New York Times and Newsweek, and has been used by the Northwest Coalition Against Malicious Harassment to train human rights activists.

In 2006, DuBowski appeared in the Paul Festa documentary Apparition of the Eternal Church. The film captures the responses of 31 authors, musicians, filmmakers and dancers as they listen to Olivier Messiaen's organ piece "Apparition of the Eternal Church."

DuBowski has worked as speaker and has moderated numerous religious dialogues on homosexuality, including a Mormon-Jewish dialogue and Christian-Muslim-Jewish panel. He and Steven Greenberg, the first openly gay Orthodox rabbi, have traveled to 60 cities and organized over 400 question-and-answer sessions, dialogues, events, inter-faith discussions.

=== Tomboychik (1994) ===
Tomboychik is a 15-minute video directed by and starring DuBowski. The story, shown through a series of vignettes, centers around his relationship with his grandmother, Malverna DuBowski, as 22-year-old Sandi DuBowski attempts to teach his 88-year-old grandmother how to film. The short video portrays struggles against gender roles and patriarchy.

The Melbourne International Film Festival described the film:

You can't get more low-budget than this, but you can't get much more emotionally powerful either. Here rare and intimate moments of pure love, regret, admiration, and naivety are shared between grandmother and grandson/filmmaker. Sometimes quite hilarious – grandma trying to figure out a video camera – and sometimes intensely touching, its loose, low-tech approach makes Tomboychik a remarkable personal document.

=== Trembling Before G-d (2001) ===
Growing up, DuBowski had not known any Orthodox Jews. The main motivation to make the film was curiosity.

I don't think it was until I met people who were kicked out of their families and their Yeshivas, in marriages betraying their spouses, that it became clear why I was doing this film. But then, for me it assumed an enormous level of responsibility to the people I met, to the issue, to the community.

The film took more than six years to make. During this time, DuBowski grew more religious and began studying the Torah regularly, he said, "It was a whole world I hadn't experienced growing up. It gave me a beauty and love for the tradition of Judaism."

=== A Jihad for Love (2007) ===
DuBowski produced the documentary A Jihad for Love (previously known as In the Name of Allah), directed by Parvez Sharma. Filmed in 11 different countries in 9 different languages, the film explores the lives of gay, lesbian, and transgender Muslims, and DuBowski intends for it to be "a profound catalyst for change"

As producer, DuBowski said that he wanted to screen the film in "every Muslim nation, even if it's underground."

=== Sabbath Queen (2024) ===
Sandi DuBowski directed and produced the feature documentary Sabbath Queen, filmed over 21 years. It follows Rabbi Amichai Lau-Lavie, the heir to 38 generations of Orthodox rabbis, as he navigates the tension between tradition and personal identity. Lau-Lavie, rejecting conventional expectations, becomes a drag performer, a queer parent, and the founder of Lab/Shul, a progressive, experimental Jewish congregation.

The film explores his efforts to redefine Jewish practice, challenge religious authority, and advocate for gender inclusivity, interfaith relationships, and political activism, including calls for peace in Israel/Palestine. Sabbath Queen examines shifting concepts of faith and community in contemporary Judaism. The project has been supported by the Sundance Institute.

== Awards and recognition ==
DuBowski was named one of The Jewish Daily Forward's "Forward 50", which is given to the 50 Jews who have "been at the center of the year's events, demonstrating leadership, offering new ideas and representing a distinct Jewish presence in American life." He is also a recipient of the Rockefeller Foundation's Film/Video/Multimedia Fellowship and the Creative Capital Moving Image Award.

Along with Rabbi Steven Greenberg, DuBowski was awarded seed funding by Steven Spielberg's Righteous Persons Foundation in order to launch an Orthodox community education project for Trembling Before G-d in the U.S., Israel and the U.K.

== Filmography ==
- Tomboychik (1994) — director, producer, photographer, editor, actor
- Missionaries Form Militias Unholy Alliance (1996) — director
- Trembling Before G-d (2001) — director, producer
- A Jihad for Love (2007) — producer
- Sabbath Queen (2024) — director, producer
