= A Jihad for Love =

2007 American documentary film

- Theatrical release poster
- Directed by: Parvez Sharma
- Written by: Parvez Sharma
- Produced by: Sandi Simcha DuBowski; Parvez Sharma
- Cinematography: Parvez Sharma
- Edited by: Juliet Weber
- Music by: Sussan Deyhim; Richard Horowitz supervised by Ramsay Adams; Abe Velez
- Distributed by: First Run Features (U.S.)
- Release dates: September 9, 2007 (Toronto International Film Festival); May 21, 2008 (United States)
- Running time: 81 minutes
- Country: United States
- Languages: English; Arabic; Persian; Urdu; Hindi; French; Turkish
- Box office: $105,651

A Jihad for Love (preceded by a short film called In the Name of Allah) is a 2008 documentary film written and directed by Parvez Sharma and was the world's first film on Islam and homosexuality. It took a total of six years to make and premiered at the Toronto International Film Festival in September 2007. It premiered at the Berlin Film Festival in 2008 as the opening documentary film for the Panorama section.

The Indo-American Arts Council referred to it as a "seminal film" because of its unprecedented subject. The work that Sharma started with the film has become a staple in many books on Islam and at U.S. University libraries. Sharma wrote the foreword for the two-part anthology Islam and Homosexuality.

According to Sharma, South Africa's Muslim Judicial Council labeled him an apostate in response to the film.

== Production ==
A Jihad for Love is produced by Halal Films, in association with the Sundance Documentary Film Fund, Channel 4 Television (UK), ZDF (Germany), Arte (France-Germany), Logo (US) and SBS (Australia).

Director and producer Parvez Sharma and co-producer Sandi Dubowski raised more than a million dollars over a six-year period to make the film.

In an interview with The New York Times, Sharma said that he "would shoot touristy footage on the first 15 minutes and the last 15 minutes of a tape", with interviews for the documentary in between, to avoid having his footage seized at customs. He posed as an employee of an AIDS relief charity in one country. The documentary was filmed in 12 different countries and in nine languages. Sharma compiled 400 hours of footage of interviews throughout North America, Europe, Africa, Asia, and the Middle East. Countries included Saudi Arabia, Iran, Iraq, Pakistan, Egypt, Bangladesh, Turkey, France, India, South Africa, the United States, and the United Kingdom. He found many of his interviewees online, and received thousands of emails.

The film premiered at the Toronto International Film Festival in September 2007, and has been screened to great acclaim at several film festivals around the world. It was the Opening film for the Panorama Dokumente section of the Berlin International Film Festival in February 2008. The U.S. theatrical release was May 21, 2008, at the IFC Center in New York City. The film screened at the Frameline Film Festival in San Francisco on June 28, 2008, and the Tokyo International Lesbian & Gay Film Festival on July 13, 2008.

The website Faith in Equality put it at number 9 in a list of LGBT films about faith.

The Guardian said, "Dignity and despair are woven tightly together in A Jihad for Love, a six-year endeavour by Indian film-maker Parvez Sharma that explores Islam and homosexuality. Without a distributor in the US, the film is one of the hottest tickets at the festival, and nobody knows what will happen at the first public screening."

Immediately after the film's theatrical launch around the U.S., Sharma launched the Muslim Dialogue Project.

The film also helped to launch the career of South African gay Imam Muhsin Hendricks by putting him and his work on the international map.

In an interview with New York magazine, Sharma said, "Being gay and Muslim myself, I knew that this film had to be about us all coming out— as Muslims. It's about claiming the Islam that has been denied to us." With a target audience of "faithful Muslims", he undertook a variety of outreach tactics, including leafleting mosques.

In an interview to the German magazine Der Spiegel, Sharma explained the significance of the title: "I'm not looking at jihad as battle -- I'm looking at the greater jihad in Islam, which is the jihad as the struggle with the self. I also thought it was really compelling to take a word that only has one connotation for most -- to take that, reclaim it and put it in the same phrase as love, which is universal. I really think it explains it very well."

In 2004, when the film was still in production, The New York Times profiled the filmmaker (it would do so again in 2015) and said:

Given the hostility toward homosexuality in some Islamic factions, Mr. Sharma has gone to great lengths to reassure many of his interview subjects that they will remain anonymous. But this obscuring of identities has led to what the director regards as one of his key challenges: filming people in silhouette or with their faces covered tends to reinforce a sense of shame around homosexuality, precisely countering one of Mr. Sharma's main objectives.

The Nation explained the methodology Sharma employed to film:

But shooting the film was no easy task. Sharma was forced to employ guerilla filmmaking tactics in Islamic countries where he knew he would never be granted government permission for his taboo subject matter. "I would shoot touristy footage on the first fifteen minutes and the last fifteen minutes of a tape, hoping that if the tape was actually confiscated at customs...they would not find the key part of the interviews, because they would just scroll through the beginning or the end," Sharma says. Luckily, Sharma managed to extradite his footage, over 400 hours worth, to the United States, where he whittled the secret lives of his subjects down to an eighty-minute film.

Cinema Politica in a review said, "A Jihad for Love is Mr. Sharma's debut and is the world's first feature documentary to explore the complex global intersections between Islam and homosexuality."

The primary film industry rankings indicator Rotten Tomatoes gave the film a 78% score, which is considered high, as it is above the 60% threshold for a "fresh" score.

== Distribution ==
The film was made available on Amazon Prime and iTunes. It was one of Netflix's earliest acquisitions. US distributor First Run Features, acquired the film for a theatrical release as well. It was also co-produced with and broadcast on Logo, UK's Channel 4, Germany's ZDF, France's Arte, and the Sundance Documentary Film Fund. They bought the film and went on to release it in more than 30 cities in the U.S. alone. This kind of release was rare for a documentary in 2008.

At New York's IFC Center, the film ran for four and a half weeks.

Earning more than $22,000 in its first five days in New York City, the film was already breaking records for documentary.

By 2016, the film had been viewed by an estimated 8 million viewers in 50 nations. A lot had to do with its sale to television networks around the world.

The film was acquired for distribution on Netflix in 2008. It was declared "one of the best Netflix movies".

Because of its debut at the TIFF in 2007, this film is often confused as a 2007 film. However, the film is actually a 2008 film since it began its wide film festival, theatrical, broadcast, networks, and streaming runs in the same year.

== Box office ==
Opening Weekend USA: $13,418, 25 May 2008, Limited Release

Gross USA: $105,033, 21 September 2008

Mongrel Media in Canada acquired the film for theatrical distribution releasing it in Toronto and Montreal. First Run Features issued a press release at the early stages of the film saying: "A Jihad for Love had a World Premiere at The Toronto International Film Festival in September 2007. It was screened at The Berlin Film Festival in Panorama in February 2008. First Run Features acquired the film for US distribution and the film saw a US theatrical release at The IFC Center in NYC on May 21, 2008.

=== Screenings ===
A Jihad for Love was screened at more than a hundred film festivals, including:

- The Toronto International Film Festival, Canada, September 2007
- The Rio Film Festival, Brazil, September 2007
- The Morelia Film Festival, Mexico, October 2007
- The Sheffield DocFest, UK, November 2007
- The Out in Africa Film Festival in Johannesburg and Cape Town, South Africa, November 2007
- MIX BRASIL, São Paulo Brasil, November 2007
- The Image + Nation Film Festival, Montreal, Canada, November 2007
- The Tri Continental Film Festival in Delhi, Mumbai, Kolkata and Bangalore, India, January 2008
- The Berlin Film Festival, Germany, February 2008
- Ambulante Documentary Film Festival, 16 cities in Mexico, February–April 2008 Thessaloniki Documentary Film Festival, Greece, March 2008
- London Gay and Lesbian Film Festival, UK, March 2008
- Istanbul International Film Festival, April 2008
- Singapore International Film Festival, April 2008
- Frameline Film Festival, San Francisco, USA June 2008
- Melbourne International Film Festival, Australia, July 2008
- Special underground screenings in Kuala Lumpur, Malaysia and Lahore, Pakistan

== Awards ==
The movie won several international awards including:

- Best Documentary, MIX BRASIL, São Paulo, Brasil
- Best Documentary, Image+Nation Film Festival, Montreal, Canada
- Best Documentary, The Tri-Continental Film Festival, India

The film went on to win 15 other international awards including the GLAAD Media Award on June 30, 2009.

At the time GLAAD said the film won this award for many reasons including it being groundbreaking: "A Jihad for Love wins best documentary at the GLAAD media awards. Writer/director Parvez Sharma and producer Sandi Dubowski were present to accept the award for their groundbreaking work."

The film had its European premier as the opening film of Panorama Documente of the Berlin Film Festival also known as the Berlinale in February 2008, where it won a special "Teddy".

In a feature on the film titled "Muslim gay filmmaker Parvez Sharma risks personal safety to tell the stories of queer Muslims around the world", Cinema Politica said. In a piece entitled "Two tickets for Jihad Please", which is a direct quote from Parvez Sharma's interview with the Black Filmmakers Collective, the journalist also noted that the film was "critically acclaimed".

Cineaste magazine said,

The climate was certainly ripe, and there was a very ambitious filmmaker who knew a good opportunity when he saw one. Parvez Sharma was raised Muslim in India and although he does have some feeling for his religion, he is by no means devout. However, as a resident of the US, post 9/11, he says he felt he had to do something in the battle to represent Islam. He declares that his religion was hijacked by extremists who preach violence and hatred, and he is not referring to Fox TV or George Bush. He means the radical clerics who have become the face of Islam in the West. Sharma sought to prove that his religion was a peaceful and loving one, and in effect, that not all Muslims are terrorists. Some are even gay.

== Critical reception ==
The film received extensive publicity worldwide. This started after its international release at the Toronto Film Festival in September 2007 and European premier as the opening film of Panorama Documente of the Berlin Film Festival in February 2008. At the latter festival the film won a special "Teddy".

The scores on Rotten Tomatoes, IMDb and Metacritic indicate that the film was overall rated very positively. The film has a score of 78% on Rotten Tomatoes, based on 32 reviews. It has a positive audience review of 68% which gives it an overall four out of 5 stars. IMDb rates the film at 13 on its list of 58 titles under the category of "Best documentaries on religion, spirituality and cults".

The women's culture website AfterEllen said,

You know that director Parvez Sharma is serious about focusing also on women in Islam when he opens his debut documentary, A Jihad for Love, with a lesbian couple at prayer. Notably, about half the film traverses lesbian landscapes, which the Indian-born Sharma covered as a print journalist for The Statesman in 1994, marking the first major newspaper presentation of lesbians within India. He remains committed to lesbian visibility now in his career as a filmmaker. "I find that gay cinema has been in decline ever since the great films of the '80s like The Times of Harvey Milk," Sharma observed. "After that, the majority of gay cinema was focused on trash. I have been troubled by the inordinate focus on the sexual lives of gay men." As a screen remedy, Sharma unveils a diverse range of practicing Muslim women at different stages of acceptance with their sexual orientation. What they share is the struggle to accommodate both Islam and homosexuality in their lives.

Editor of Indiewire Eugene Hernandez said, "This long-in-the-works documentary exploring the intersection of homosexuality and Islam will surely provoke discussion."

Filmmaker magazine said that "Sharma's film is an intelligent and eloquent exposition of a taboo subject that not only movingly pays tribute to the strength and integrity of the film's embattled subjects but – despite its provocative title – maintains a reverent rather than critical attitude towards the Islamic religion."

The film also had its fair share of criticism. On September 5, 2008, Seattle Times said, "For all the research, courage and passion that went into it, the movie is sometimes curiously one-note."

After the film, the filmmaker for three years went on a nationwide speaking tour of college campuses including University of Chicago, Harvard, Stanford, Berkeley, NYU, Columbia, UCLA and more.

== Significance of the title ==
The title A Jihad for Love refers to the Islamic concept of jihad, as a religious struggle. The film seeks to reclaim this concept of personal struggle, as it is used by the media and politicians almost exclusively to mean "holy war" and to refer to violent acts perpetrated by extremist Muslims.

Bismillah was considered as an early working title for the film, but was not considered as the final title to avoid further controversy.

Among Muslims, the phrase (bismillah in Arabic) may be used before beginning actions, speech, or writing. Its most notable use in Al-Fatiha, the opening passage of the Qur'an, which begins Bismillahi r-Rahmani r-Rahim. All surahs of the Qur'an begin with "Bismillahi r-Rahmani r-Rahim", with the exception of the ninth.

Producer DuBowski's previous film, Trembling Before G-d, on Orthodox and Hasidic Jews, also included the name of God, written with a hyphen as in Jewish tradition. Allah is the name of God in Islam and Arabic, and it is often used among Muslims residing in Muslim countries and monotheists in Arabic speaking countries.

== Controversy and problems ==
Sharma's making of the film has not been without criticism. According to Sharma, "About every two weeks I get an e-mail that berates me, condemns me to hell and, if they are nice, asks me to still seek forgiveness while there is still time."

The spokesperson of the Singapore Board of Censors, Amy Chua, said to The Straits Times, "The film was banned from screening at the 2008 Singapore International Film Festival in view of the sensitive nature of the subject that features Muslim homosexuals in various countries and their struggle to reconcile religion and their lifestyle."

After its September 2007 festival release at the Toronto Film Festival the film began to generate worldwide controversy. At its premier at TIFF 2007, the director was given a security guard.

On November 2, 2004, the New York Times said,

Sharma refuses to associate homosexuality with shame, but recognizes the need to protect the safety and privacy of his sources, by filming them in silhouette or with their faces blurred. In one case, the family of an Afghan woman he interviewed "would undoubtedly kill her" if they found out she was lesbian. In another example, one of the associate producers, an Egyptian gay man, chose not to be listed in the credits for fear of possible consequences.

The film was banned in Singapore and many Muslim and some Arab nations. Press reports about the Singapore ban, for example said "About 14 percent of Singapore's 4.4 million population is Muslim. The film was shown in film festivals in Hong Kong, Tokyo and in Jakarta, Indonesia at the recently concluded Q Film Festival." They also said that the film's sale and broadcast on NDTV, South Asia's largest network in 2008 would have a "remarkable" impact. "NDTV's broadcast has in effect made the film available to over one billion viewers in India, Bangladesh, Pakistan, the UAE, and large portions of the Middle East and Africa – many of which continue to experience tension along religious lines."

The various distributors and their Total Rating Points in European television, the Indian/South-Asian sale with its claimed footprint of 15 billion viewers, the theatrical release and the purportedly large numbers of Netflix viewers made the filmmakers and the TRP experts (a term used in South Asia for audience measurement) arrive at a number of eight million total viewers calculated over a period of four years for this documentary. That number was quoted in various books over the years.

Sharma has praised the NDTV for taking the "bold and courageous step" to broadcast the film "in a time when India's draconian Section 377 of the penal code that makes homosexuality illegal has been successfully challenged in the Delhi High Court."

The film was banned in the entire MENA region and 18 of the 22 countries that comprise the Middle East. Egyptian activist and blogger Ethar El-Katatney wrote the following from Cairo on February 15, 2008:

Homosexuality is not a comfortable, much less a popular, topic among Muslims. Broach the subject in the Middle East, and you're likely to hear a response like the one Iranian president Mahmoud Ahmadinejad gave US audiences last year: "In Iran, we don't have homosexuals, like in your country." At best, society adopts a 'don't ask, don't tell' approach – do what you will, just don't advertise it. A controversial new documentary, A Jihad for Love, is shattering that taboo by interviewing homosexual Muslims, including an Egyptian gay man 'outed' by his arrest during the 2001 Queen Boat raid and an Egyptian lesbian still hiding her sexuality from society. Filmmaker Parvez Sharma had dual motivations: first, to challenge the mindset that Muslim and gay are mutually exclusive, and second, to challenge the Western world's own Islamophobia.

The Arab media including Katatney and Egypt Today then reported "A Jihad for Love has polarized the discussion of homosexuality among Muslims. Critics argue that Sharma portrays homosexual activity as permissible in Islam, while they contend that it clearly isn't. They also accuse Sharma of bias: "As a gay Muslim man, they argue that he began the project with prejudices and a predefined position on homosexuality." On a television program which used clips of the film and Sharma, called The Right Way, Masoud said Sharma was not trained in the Muslim practice of Ijtihad, saying "Only around 20 of over 100,000 companions of the prophet were "ahl estembat" (those who considered themselves qualified enough to actually interpret Qur'an and Hadith). But calling for a more peaceful Islam he praised the title of the film saying, "I love the title [of the movie] but when defined differently. We need to have jihad against extremism in society so we can learn to love the sinning person that is struggling, even though we hate their sin. And so, I too, call for a jihad for love".

The New York Times said "After A Jihad for Love, Mr. Sharma was labeled a Kafir, and in the intervening years, he has gotten more death threats than he cares to recall."

The fatwas calling for Sharma's death and just the death threats and hate email continued up until Sharma's next project, A Sinner in Mecca, when they were renewed again.

Sharma went on to appear widely in the news media to defend and explain the thesis of the film, which according to him reclaimed the meaning of Jihad and was not an anti-Islam film. The New Yorker said,

Sharma, the filmmaker, grew up twenty minutes from the Darul Uloom, an important center of Islamic learning in Uttar Pradesh, in northern India. Aware of his sexual orientation since puberty, he said the center's daily calls to prayer haunted him. He came to the United States in 2000, but still faces discrimination. "I attend the Ninety-sixth Street mosque, in Manhattan," he told me. "You can't imagine the kind of sermons I've heard."

== International Muslim Dialogue Project ==
The film producer Sandi DuBowski and Director/Producer Parvez Sharma launched the International Muslim Dialogue Project in 2008.

Part of the aim for the project was to organize screenings of the film in Muslim Capitals. Sharma called it the "Underground Network Model" of film distribution. He invented this model sending unmarked DVD's of the film with friends and colleagues to Muslim capitals across the world with full permission to sell pirated copies. Some of the boldest were Beirut, Cairo, Karachi, eight cities in Indonesia and Kuala Lumpur.

In a feature titled "How Parvez Sharma made a Jihad for Love", the U.S. based New York magazine said on May 18, 2008,

As such, Sharma says his ideal audience is faithful Muslims—and not just "gay white men or activists". To reach them, he's "smuggled tapes into Iran and Pakistan," leafleted mosques, blanketed MySpace, and "hosted a screening at a home in Astoria for fifteen key progressive Muslim leaders." There's more to do: "Over the last six years, some of the most amazing conversations I've had about this film have been with taxi drivers, but I'm stumped about how to reach them again."

In 2015 he launched a global Muslim empowerment endeavor called Project 786. The project's website says "Project 786 is a worldwide Outreach, Dialogue and Measurable Change Project aimed at significantly impacting and changing contemporary discourse about Islam, today the world's fastest growing and most contested religion."

== See also ==
- Islam and homosexuality
- Gay Muslims (2006), a Channel 4 TV documentary about gay and lesbian Muslims in Britain
- Trembling Before G-d (2001), a documentary film directed by Jihad for Love producer Sandi Simcha DuBowski, about Orthodox Jews who are gay or lesbian
- Fremde Haut (2005), a film about an Iranian lesbian in Germany
