= Parvez Sharma =

Indian film director and journalist

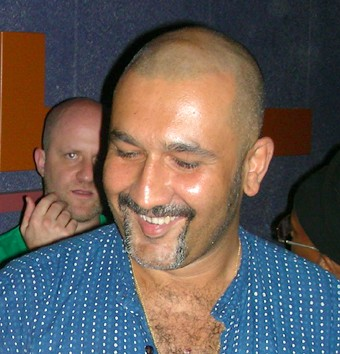
- Sharma at a showing of A Jihad for Love in Washington, D.C., on 7 September 2008
- Born: 8 July 1973 (age 53); India
- Education: University of Calcutta; Jamia Millia Islamia University; Cardiff University; American University
- Occupations: Filmmaker and writer
- Website: https://parvezsharma.com/

Parvez Sharma is a New York-based Indian-American filmmaker, author, and journalist. He is a recipient of the 2018 Guggenheim Fellowship in the film/video category. He was amongst the 173 fellows selected from 3000 applicants in the 94th year of the fellowship, which originally started in 1925. In an official press release by the foundation, president Edward Hirsch said, "The winners of the 94th annual competition as "the best of the best...This diverse group of scholars, artists, and scientists are appointed on the basis of prior achievement and exceptional promise." Sharma is best known for his two films A Jihad for Love, A Sinner in Mecca, and his 2017 book A Sinner in Mecca: A Gay Muslim's Hajj of Defiance. A Jihad for Love was the world's first film documenting the lives of gay and lesbian Muslims. He received the 2009 GLAAD Media Award for Outstanding Documentary amongst several other international awards for A Jihad for Love. In 2016, Sharma was named "a human rights defender" by Amnesty International. This was an award given at the Hague in the Netherlands to "worldwide human rights activists" which he shared with the Saudi human rights activist Ensaf Haidar.

His second film, A Sinner in Mecca, premiered at the 2015 Hot Docs Canadian International Documentary Festival and is a New York Times Critics' Pick amongst other press attention. Over the years, worldwide press have profiled Parvez Sharma and reviewed his work. For example, The New York Times collectively in two excerpts and two reviews, says "There is no doubting the courage and conviction of the New York documentarian Parvez Sharma…We emerge from (Sharma's) films more enlightened, but arranging to meet (this filmmaker) is a little like setting up an appointment with an extremely polite spy. Nothing in his difficult processes -- including the threats to himself -- have destroyed Mr. Sharma's faith in the ability of Islam to tolerate diversity." The newspaper also showcased his short films online. In 2004 the New York Times had said, "threats to the director have become routine." This was almost four years before A Jihad for Love was released. The New York Times said "After A Jihad for Love, Mr. Sharma was labeled a Kafir, and in the intervening years, he has gotten more death threats than he cares to recall."

== Early life ==
Sharma was born on 8 July 1973 in New Delhi and grew up in various cities all over India. His high school was a Catholic School called St Mary's Academy where all students had to recite the Pater Noster during morning assembly. He studied English literature at Presidency College of the University of Calcutta. He received his master's degrees in Mass Communication (Film and Television) from Jamia Millia Islamia University, Broadcast Journalism from the University of Wales, Cardiff, and Video from American University's School of Communication. He moved to the United States in 2000 as a student at Columbia University's Film School, but was unable to continue a second semester due to lack of funds and moved to American University where he was given scholarships.

=== Early career ===
Parvez Sharma worked as television journalist in India and the United Kingdom, including for India's 24-hour news television network NDTV. A journalist, Sharma has worked in radio, print, and broadcast. Sharma worked as a producer at Democracy Now! in New York in 2003. He has taught as an adjunct professor at American University, developing and teaching that university's first curriculum on Bollywood and other Indian cinemas.

His piece "Emerging from the Shadows" for The Statesman in India was the country's first major newspaper article to discuss the life of Indian lesbians.

He was involved in the organization of the first organized LGBT effort in the state of West Bengal and has spoken internationally on LGBT issues, human rights violations across the world and the crisis in 21st century Islam.

== Career ==
On 18 November 2017, Rensselaer Polytechnic Institute and the Sanctuary for Independent Media said, "For the past decade he has made fearless, multiple award winning films about faith, identity, religious extremism and social justice." The Washington Post said about the second film, "In the film, Sharma condemns the Saudi government's strict interpretation of Islam, which he says promotes the dangerous ideology that produces groups such as the militant Islamic State." Reviewing A Jihad for Love the newspaper had said, "Sharma is right to keep his focus tight. He is interested in the faithful and their conflicts, not the broader cultural issues surrounding sex and Islamic society." The Los Angeles Times said Sharma "crossed several dangerous lines in his work and the government in Singapore banned A Jihad for Love and that the Muslim Judicial Council in South Africa has declared him an apostate." Fridae Asia reported, "A Jihad for Love - which Singapore censors say is too controversial to be shown at the country's international film festival last year - was broadcast to potentially more than a billion in India and other countries by India's NDTV." A Jihad for Love was banned from the Singapore International Film Festival in 2008 by the Media Development Authority, which oversees the censorship board, "in view of the sensitive nature of the subject that features Muslim homosexuals in various countries and their struggle to reconcile religion and their lifestyle." About 14 percent of Singapore's 4.4 million population is Muslim. Singapore banned A Sinner in Mecca, as did Egypt, Iran, Pakistan and Bangladesh. Yet semi-open screenings were held in Cairo, Kuala Lumpur and Karachi. In just its opening week during a limited release of 33 cities, A Jihad for Love, for example, ran for four weeks at New York's IFC theaters. The film grossed $22,287, out of which $10,519 was just in New York. The Domestic Total Gross for the film is $105,659. A Jihad for Love was theatrically released in 33 cities, while A Sinner in Mecca was released in only four cities, for a week each. Its box office numbers were low, except in New York where it had a higher box office return of $11,220.

=== Filmography ===
Title	Year	Notes	Ref.
Dance of the Wind	1997	Assistant Director, Assistant Casting	
Twenty Four Hours (Farooq Abdullah) (Star TV)	1998	Producer, Correspondent	
The Gujarat Trilogy (Star TV)	1999	Producer, Correspondent	
Arranged Shaadi (BBC World and Star TV)	1999	Producer, Correspondent	
In The Name of Allah	2002	Director, cinematographer, producer	
Silverlake Life	2003	Additional Camera, Assistant Editor (DVD)	
Tying The Knot	2004	Associate Producer	
The Hour (TV Series)	2007	Interviewed	
A Jihad for Love	2008	Director, cinematographer, producer	
A Sinner in Mecca	2015	Director, writer, producer, cinematographer	

=== General ===
As a commentator on Islamic, racial and political issues, Sharma's writings have appeared on The Huffington Post, The Daily Beast and The Guardian.

In 2009 Sharma reported about the aborted Green Movement in Iran using firsthand accounts and interviews with friends in Tehran and often giving readers of The Huffington Post and The Daily Beast a look into the workings of the uprising.

In early 2011 Sharma blogged about the revolution in Egypt, providing a local perspective on the events. He spoke about the nature and extent of social media influence in the Middle East to press across the world, including interviews with newspapers in China, including the South China Morning Post and interviews on various US networks including CNBC, MSNBC and FOX News.

Sharma continues to be a commentator on Islamic, racial and political issues. In 2009 Sharma wrote the foreword for the anthology Islam and Homosexuality (Praeger, 2009). He was interviewed and his work was profiled in journalist Robin Wrights book 'Rock the Casbah: Rage and Rebellion in the Middle East'. His work on the Arab Spring was profiled in author Cole Strykers book 'Hacking the Future: Privacy, Identity and Anonymity on the Web'. In 2007 he wrote a chapter for the book Gay Travels in the Muslim World.

The US-based OUT Magazine named Sharma one of the OUT 100 twice for 2008 and 2015- "one of the 100 gay men and women who have helped shape our culture during the year". In 2016 Sharma won the Monette Horowitz award given to individuals and organizations for their significant contributions toward eradicating homophobia.

In his early career he has worked on programming for BBC World Television (India), the Discovery Channel (United States), and the World Bank (United States).

As an author Sharma is represented by literary agency Sterling Lord Literistic. As a speaker, he was represented by Lavin Speakers and Keppler Speakers.

In 2009, Sharma was named as one of "50 Visionaries changing your world" in a list headed by the Dalai Lama. On 29 May 2013 Sharma was honored as an "LGBT hero" by first-lady Michelle Obama at a DNC fundraiser in New York.

=== Awards ===
In 2018, Sharma was the recipient of the Guggenheim Fellowship in the film/video category.

Sharma has received awards and grants over the years including

The Sundance Documentary Fund [Dec, 2006]

Andy Warhol Foundation for The Visual Arts [Dec, 2006]

GLAAD Media Award, 2008 for Outstanding Documentary

The Ted Snowdon Foundation [June, 2005]

The Hartley Film Foundation [June, 2005]

The Yip Harburg Foundation [Nov, 2005 and Aug, 2007]

Stonewall Community Fund [Nov, 2005]

H. van Ameringen Foundation [November 2005, June 2007, December 2007, October 2013, September 2015]

Foundation for Fairer Capitalism [Feb, 2006]

E. Rhodes & Leona B. Carpenter Foundation [March, 2006]

Tides Foundation 4/2006 and [April, 2008]

Rita J. & Stanley H. Kaplan Family Foundation, Inc. [May, 2006]

The Vanguard Charitable Endowment Program [June, 2006]

Reid Williams Foundation [July, 2006]

The Fledgling Fund [Aug, 2006]

B.W. Bastian Foundation [Aug, 2006 and July, 2007]

The Reva & David Logan Foundation [Sep, 2006]

The Ford Foundation Matching Gift Program [Sep, 2006]

Jeff Lewy Trust [Sep, 2006]

Horizons Foundation [September 2006, October 2006, March, 2007, July 2007 and March 2008]

Rosenthal Rev. Trust [Oct, 2006]

Global Fund for Women [Oct, 2006]

Zeigler Family Trust [Nov, 2006]

The Katahdin Foundation [Dec, 2006]

The Shelley & Donald Rubin Foundation [Dec, 2006] and [Dec, 2007]

Arcus Foundation [Jan, 2007 and Jan, 2008]

Cinereach [Oct, 2005]

The CAA Foundation [Jan, 2007]

Gill Foundation [Jan, 2007 and Feb, 2007]

Evelyn & Walter Haas, Jr. Fund [Jan, 2007]

Lucius & Eva Eastman Fund [April, 2007]

Arts PAC—Artists for Freedom Of Expression [June, 2007]

The Zacks Family Foundation [Aug, 2007]

The Ted Snowdon Foundation [Sep, 2007]

Cinereach Foundation [Sep, 2007 and March, 2008]

The Paul Rapoport Foundation [May, 2008]

Lesbian Equity Fund (Astraea) [April, 2008]

The Elliott H. Matthews Foundation [June, 2008]

Best Film, Image +Nation, Montreal 2008, 2015

Best Film, Mix Brasil 2008

==== Film Festivals ====
Parvez Sharma's work was screened and awarded in many film festivals including:

Milan International Lesbian and Gay Film Festival [2008]

Outfest - Grand Jury Award [2015]

Sheffield International Documentary Festival [2015]

Torino International Gay & Lesbian Film Festival [2008]

Best Film, Tricontinental Festival India, 2008

Special Teddy, Berlin International Film Festival 2008

Outfest, Los Angeles, Best Documentary, 2008 and 2015

Best Film, Turin Film Festival, 2008

Best Film, Amal Arab Film Festival, 2008

Best Documentary, Rapid Lion Film Festival, Johannesburg [March, 2016]

Best Documentary, Reeling Film Festival, Chicago [Oct, 2018]

Best Documentary, One World International Film Festival, Prague, 2008

=== Films: A Jihad for Love and A Sinner in Mecca ===
Sharma is best known for directing the films A Jihad for Love and A Sinner in Mecca. A Jihad for Love is a documentary that seeks to refute the belief that LGBT Muslims do not exist. This film was preceded by a short film called In the Name of Allah.

Sharma, director and cinematographer of the film, came up with the idea after listening to the stories of gay Muslims when he attended American University. He decided to give a voice "to a community that really needed to be heard, and that until now hadn't been. It was about going where the silence was strongest."

The film premiered in 2007 at the Toronto International Film Festival and in 2008 at the Berlinale. It went on to premier at more than a hundred film festivals globally and was released in theaters in the US and Canada in 2008 by First Run Features and Mongrel Media. It was produced by Sandi Simcha DuBowski in association with Channel 4 Television (UK), ZDF (Germany), Arte (France), MTV-Logo (US), The Sundance Documentary Fund and SBS. While the film reveals homophobia and persecution in the Muslim world, Sharma has stated that the purpose of the film is not to vilify Islam. In an early interview he said, "The Islam that this film is seeking to reclaim is rich, it is pulsating, it's welcoming, condemning sometimes, it's loving, it's erotic, it's sensual, it's poetic and it's musical."

A Jihad for Love had a theatrical release across 33 cities in the continental United States and a theatrical release by Mongrel Media in Canada limited to Toronto and Vancouver.

By 2011, Sharma had conducted live events and screenings of A Jihad for Love in many Muslim nations and capitals ranging from Beirut, Lebanon and Istanbul, Turkey, to Bishkek, Kyrgyzstan and Kuala Lumpur, Malaysia. In Indonesia, the film did an 8-city tour to acclaim and also protests. A multi city tour in Mexican theaters organized by Ambulante used the film as a tool for advocacy in deeply religious communities in that country. The film also thrived underground, with private screenings of smuggled DVDs. In July 2009 Sharma conducted workshops on Islam and homosexuality with German parliamentarians in Berlin and was invited to screen and workshop A Jihad for Love by the European Union. Sharma was first profiled by The New York Times in 2004 which said "Given the hostility toward homosexuality in some Islamic factions, Mr. Sharma has gone to great lengths to reassure many of his interview subjects that they will remain anonymous."

The film also had its fair share of criticism. On 5 September 2008 Seattle Times said, "For all the research, courage and passion that went into it, the movie is sometimes curiously one-note."

With his second film, A Sinner in Mecca, The New York Times ran a second feature profile feature on Sharma, saying "The documentary, largely recorded on an iPhone strapped to Mr. Sharma's neck with rubber bands, shows the pilgrimage in unflinching detail. The result is a religious reality film, but also a piercing indictment of Saudi Arabia" The film premiered in Toronto at the 2015 HotDocs Canadian Film Festival and opened in theaters in the US on 4 September 2015. The film won Best Documentary at Outfest Los Angeles in July 2015. A Sinner in Mecca received press and audience attention but also lead to online abuse, death threats and hate mail.

Even though both his films were banned in Singapore and parts of the Middle East and led to theological condemnation in many countries, Sharma is a leading spokesperson on defending Islam yet being able to speak for urgent reform, as a Muslim. He has conducted more than 200 live events across the world, talking about Islam and, in part, its relation to topics ranging from ISIS to homosexuality.

==== Controversies ====
As early as 2 November 2004, a New York Times interview explained, "threats to the director have become routine. "About every two weeks I get an e-mail that berates me, condemns me to hell and, if they are nice, asks me to still seek forgiveness while there is still time." He was provided a personal security detail at the TIFF 2007 premiere of A Jihad for Love in 2007 and A Sinner in Mecca 2015 premiere at Hotdocs in Toronto. The death threats and hate mail continued over the years. In 2015, The Toronto Star said " Security is being added for the world premiere 29 April of A Sinner in Mecca ". On September 4, 2014, the day the film was released theatrically in the US, the New York Times said "After "Jihad," Mr. Sharma was labeled an infidel, and in the intervening years, he has gotten more death threats than he cares to recall."

The death threats and hate mail were widely discussed in the mainstream media. The Guardian said, "Parvez Sharma's film A Sinner in Mecca, in which he tries to reconcile his sexuality and his religion, resulted in hate mail and threats." The Washington Post said that it was an "enormous amount of hate mail and death threats". VICE said the threats were a "barrage" adding that, "Sharma is no stranger to controversial filmmaking".

Singapore was amongst the first nations to ban the two films from being screened or being streamed online on services like Netflix. Chairperson of the board of Film Censors Amy Chua as saying that the film was "disallowed in view of the sensitive nature of the subject". A Sinner in Mecca was "was given a "Not Allowed for all Ratings" classification."

GCN wrote, "Sharma is no stranger to death threats; 'A Jihad for Love', his documentary about the lives of gay and lesbian Muslims, generated much controversy upon its release in 2007. Days after the film's April premier, Sharma says Iranian government propaganda websites accused him of promoting a "disgusting act of homosexuality," adding that the film was an 'insult to Islam.'" PinkNews reported Sharma saying, "The very Muslims I'm seeking acceptance from are attacking me because I'm a gay man and because I made this film. As a Muslim, you are taught from a very young age that you do not mess with Mecca, and I'm doing exactly that." OUT said, "Parvez Sharma ... grew up gay in a conservative city in India, but he seems impervious to vitriol, which helps, considering that his latest documentary, A Sinner in Mecca – a story of his personal journey on the hajj – has resulted in death threats since it began screening.

=== A Sinner in Mecca, A Gay Muslim's Hajj of Defiance (Book) and Islam Trilogy ===
In 15 August 2017, Parvez Sharma released his first book A Sinner in Mecca, A Gay Muslim's Hajj of Defiance by publisher BenBella Books. They declared it one of their front-list titles. The publisher claims 14 NYT bestsellers on its list.

Sharma started writing professionally at an early age. Between the years of 1994 and 1996, he started writing as an undergraduate at Presidency College, Calcutta in India, for the newspapers The Telegraph, The Statesman and The Business Standard. He contributed to US publications like Trikone.

The book has mixed reviews in the media.

The Guardian newspaper says, "Written by a man with a deep knowledge of Islamic historic; with courage and fierce emotion." It adds, "Parvez Sharma is a proud gay Muslim whose first film, A Jihad For Love, was the first ever made about Islam and homosexuality. It made him the subject of death threats throughout the Arab world."

In the book Sharma sharply veers away from the subject of the film of the same name and instead focuses on Wahhabi Islam, Daesh, Saudi Arabia, the Indian sub-continent and more.

Sharma has called the book as the final product of his "Islam Trilogy" in various interviews. In one titled "A Jihad for Love and Equality: A Chat with trailblazer, Parvez Sharma" he explains this as,"The Islam Trilogy is my contribution to history which actually began three months after September 11, 2001, when I started filming, A Jihad for Love, the world's first film on Islam and homosexuality. In 2011, just months after I reported the Arab Spring extensively and bin Laden's death I decided to go on Hajj. This would be my Hajj of defiance—and if found out I faced certain beheading. But as a filmmaker I knew this would be the greatest journey of my life and there was no way I would not film it. It was historic, you are not permitted to film in Mecca according to Wahhabi theology (even though short YouTube videos proliferate) but I did. Many shut their doors on me. Many foundations who had embraced Jihad were too afraid of this. In any case a three-year struggle ensued and we had another world first— A Sinner in Mecca, a film in Mecca and Medina shot entirely on an iPhone. Then I began writing the book that would say everything the film was not able to. That became A Sinner in Mecca: A Gay Muslim's Hajj of Defiance. Thus the trilogy which represents almost two decades of hard earned work ends as I had always planned it."

In 2018, A Sinner In Mecca was nominated for a Lambda Literary Award in the category of Gay Memoir/Biography and for a 2017 Foreword INDIES Award.

== Inspirational and Activist Speaker ==
Sharma has been a featured speaker at more than 40 college campuses in the U.S., which include Stanford, Berkeley, Yale, Columbia, NYU, Harvard (1 April 2016 and 17 October 2016), Syracuse, Northwestern and the University of Chicago. He toured several US Southern States in 2009 and called it his "Bible Belt Tour" speaking directly to issues around LGBT rights (or the lack thereof) within conservative Christian communities.

In 2009 Sharma was invited as a keynote speaker to the United Nations at the Geneva Summit for Human Rights and Democracy during Durban Review Conference. The same year he also addressed one of the world's largest gatherings of LGBT activists at the Gay Games in Copenhagen. He was invited by the Foreign Services Institute of the US Department of State as a keynote speaker in Washington, D.C., on 21 June 2012. The event was called "The Rights of LGBT Persons in the Middle East and South and Central Asia." On 20 December 2012, he conducted a day-long workshop with officials from the USCIS in the Department of Homeland Security.

== International Muslim Dialogue Project ==
The film producer Sandi DuBowski and director/ Producer Parvez Sharma launched the International Muslim Dialogue Project in 2008.

Part of the aim for the project was to organize screenings of the film in Muslim Capitals. Sharma called it the "Underground Network Model" of film distribution. He invented this model sending unmarked DVDs of the film with friends and colleagues to Muslim capitals across the world with full permission to sell pirated copies.

Some of the boldest were Beirut, Cairo, Karachi, eight cities in Indonesia and Kuala Lumpur.

In a feature titled "How Parvez Sharma made a Jihad for Love" the U.S. based New York magazine said on 18 May 2008 "As such, Sharma says his ideal audience is faithful Muslims—and not just 'gay white men or activists.' To reach them, he's 'smuggled tapes into Iran and Pakistan,' leafleted mosques, blanketed MySpace, and 'hosted a screening at a home in Astoria for fifteen key progressive Muslim leaders.' There's more to do: 'Over the last six years, some of the most amazing conversations I've had about this film have been with taxi drivers, but I'm stumped about how to reach them again.'"

In 2015 he launched a global Muslim empowerment endeavor called Project 786. The project's website says "Project 786 is a worldwide Outreach, Dialogue and Measurable Change Project aimed at significantly impacting and changing contemporary discourse about Islam, today the worlds fastest growing and most contested religion."

== See also ==
- Islam and homosexuality
- List of gay, lesbian or bisexual people
- List of Indian documentary filmmakers
- List of film and television directors
