= Yisrael Meir Lau =

Polish-born Israeli rabbi (b. 1937)

Rabbi Yisrael Meir Lau ישראל מאיר לאו
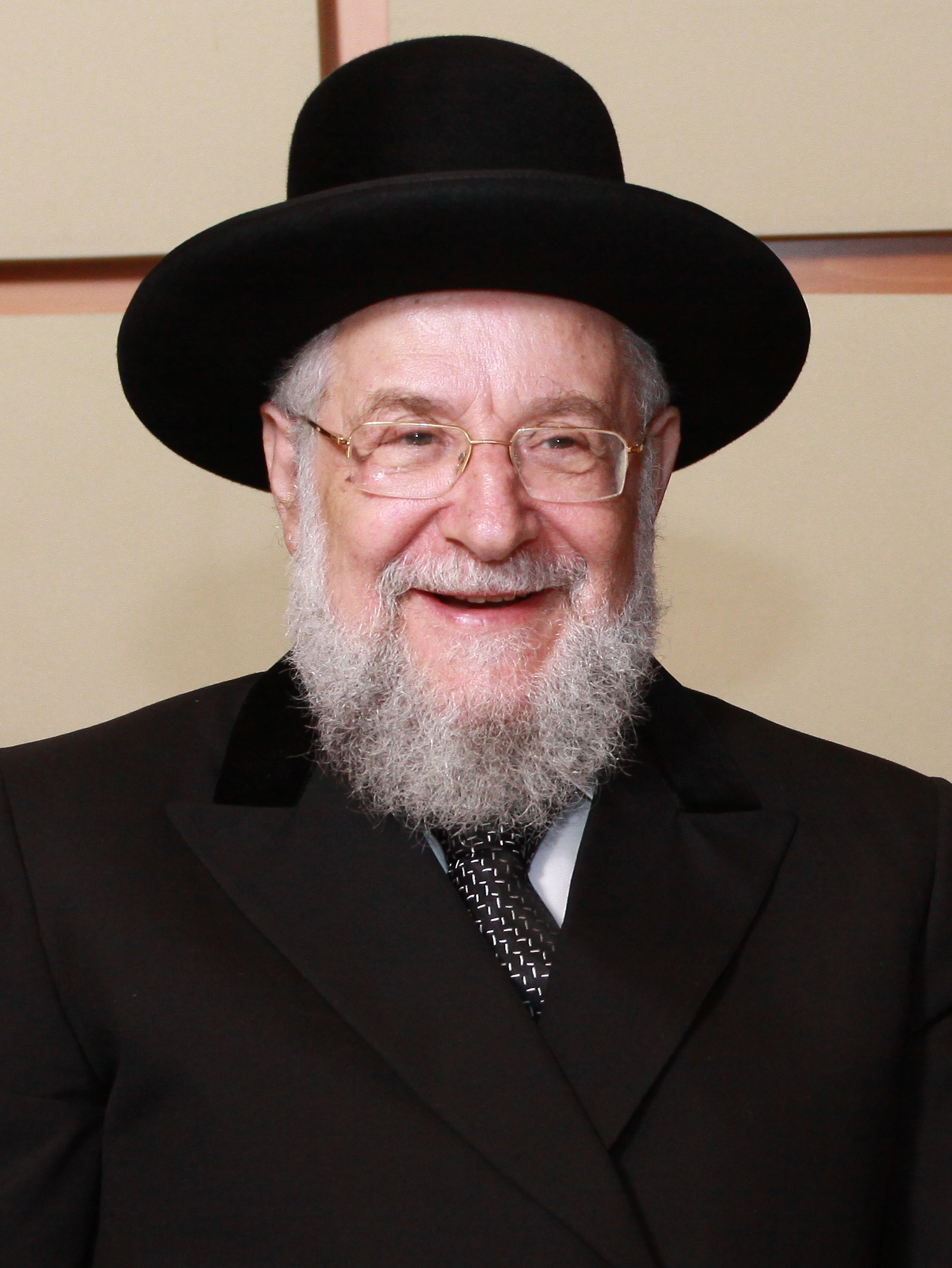
- Title: Chief Rabbi of Tel Aviv; Chairman of Yad Vashem

Personal life
- Born: Yisrael Meir Lau; 1 June 1937 (age 89) Piotrków Trybunalski, Poland
- Children: 8 children, including David Lau
- Parent(s): Rabbi Moshe Chaim Lau and Chaya Lau

Religious life
- Religion: Judaism
- Denomination: Haredi Judaism

Jewish leader
- Other: former Ashkenazi Chief Rabbi of Israel
- Residence: Tel Aviv

Yisrael (Israel) Meir Lau (Hebrew: ישראל מאיר לאו; born 1 June 1937) is a Holocaust survivor who served as the Ashkenazi Chief Rabbi of Israel from 1993 to 2003. He was previously Chief Rabbi of Tel Aviv, Israel. After his tenure as chief rabbi, he was appointed chairman of Yad Vashem.

== Biography ==
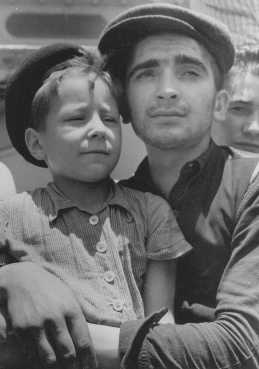
Yisrael Meir Lau (8 years old) in the arms of Elazar Schiff, Buchenwald survivors at their arrival at Haifa on 15 July 1945

=== Early life and World War II ===
Lau was born on 1 June 1937, in the Polish town of Piotrków Trybunalski. His father, Rabbi Moshe Chaim Lau (Polish: Mojżesz Chaim Lau), the last Chief Rabbi of the town, was murdered in the Treblinka extermination camp. Yisrael Meir is the 38th generation in an unbroken family chain of rabbis.

As a seven-year-old, after traumatic separation from his mother Chaya, Lau was imprisoned in a Nazi slave labor camp and then in Buchenwald concentration camp. He has attributed his unlikely survival to heroic efforts of his elder brother Naphtali Lau-Lavie who concealed him, at constant risk, and enlisted other prisoners in this effort. In 1945, Yisrael Meir was freed from the Buchenwald concentration camp. He became a poster child for miraculous survival, and the inhumanity of the Nazi regime, after U.S. Army chaplain Rabbi Herschel Schacter detected him hiding behind a heap of corpses when the camp was liberated. Lau has credited a teen prisoner with protecting him in the camp (later determined by historian Kenneth Waltzer to be Fedor Mikhailichenko). His entire family was murdered, with the exception of his elder brother, Naphtali Lau-Lavie, his half brother, Yehoshua Lau-Hager, and his uncle already living in Mandatory Palestine.

=== Aliyah and studies ===
Lau immigrated to Mandatory Palestine with his brother Naphtali in July 1945, where he was raised by an aunt and uncle, and studied in the yeshiva Kol Torah under Rabbi Shlomo Zalman Auerbach as well as in Ponevezh Yeshiva and Knesses Chizkiyahu. He was ordained as a rabbi in 1961.

=== Rabbinical career ===
He served as Chief Rabbi in Netanya (1978–1988), and at that time developed his reputation as a popular orator.

=== Family ===
Lau married Chaya Ita Frankel, a daughter of Rabbi Yitzchok Yedidya Frankel, the Rabbi of South Tel Aviv.

Lau is the father of three sons and five daughters. His eldest son, Moshe Chaim, took his place as Rabbi in Netanya in 1989; his son David became the Chief Rabbi of Modi'in, and later Ashkenazi Chief Rabbi of Israel; and his youngest, Tzvi Yehuda, is the Rabbi of North Tel Aviv. Lau is the uncle of Rabbi Binyamin (Benny) Lau, an educator and activist in the Religious Zionist movement, and Amichai Lau-Lavie, the founder and artistic director of the Jewish ritual theater company Storahtelling.

=== Chairman of Yad Vashem ===
In 2008, Lau was appointed chairman of Yad Vashem, succeeding Tommy Lapid.

== Rabbinical career ==
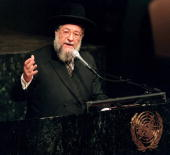
Rabbi Lau addresses the United Nations.

Lau was ordained as a rabbi in 1961. His first rabbinic position was at the Ohr Torah synagogue in North Tel Aviv. In 1965 he was appointed as rabbi of the Tiferet Tzvi Synagogue in Tel Aviv, a position he held until 1971 when he was appointed rabbi of North Tel Aviv.

In 1978, Lau was appointed as chief rabbi of the city of Netanya. In 1983 Lau was appointed to serve on the Mo'etzet of the Israeli Chief Rabbinate. In 1988, after the death of his father-in-law, Lau was appointed to serve as chief rabbi of Tel Aviv, a position he held until 1993. When Lau met the Lubavitcher Rebbe, Rabbi Menachem M. Schneerson, in 1992, Schneerson told Lau to finish his work in Tel Aviv, as he would soon be chosen to become the Chief Rabbi of Israel. In 1993, Lau was elected Chief Rabbi of Israel. He served as Chief Rabbi till 2003.

On 9 June 2005, Lau was reinstalled as Chief Rabbi of Tel Aviv returning to the post he served from 1985 until 1993.

Lau has often been characterized as the "consensus rabbi", and has close ties to both Haredi and Modern Orthodox Judaism, particularly in regard to his politics, which have been characterized as moderate Zionist. One report described him as "too Zionist to be considered Haredi."

He is one of the few figures in the Haredi world who has managed to gain the trust and admiration of both the Sephardic and Ashkenazic population. Lau has received some negative attention for his stances and remarks on non-Orthodox denominations of Judaism. When Lau was awarded the Israel Prize in May 2005, there were protests from the Masorti and Reform movements in Israel. Non-Orthodox leaders noted that it was ironic that Lau was being honored for "bridging rifts in Israeli society". Lau's spokespeople said that the fact that he had been approved by the (presumably heterogeneous) Prize Committee spoke for itself.^{3}

== Interfaith work ==
In 1993, Rav Lau had an hour-long meeting with John Paul II at the Pope's summer residence of Castel Gandolfo, seeking the Vatican's moral support for the latest peace moves in the Middle East. The visit was the first between a Pope and one of Israel's chief rabbis since the founding of the Jewish state in 1948. In 2009, he was critical of a speech given by Pope Benedict XVI during a visit to Israel. He applauded a later papal statement which gave more emphasis to the suffering of Jews during the Holocaust.

== Presidential candidacy ==
In the spring of 2006, the Israeli media reported that Lau was being considered for presidency of the State of Israel. Some critics in the Israeli media wrote that Lau was more focused on maintaining his image as a progressive than in implementing such positions in the rabbinate's policies, specifically major issues such as agunot, civil marriage, the status of Shabbat, and other divisive topics that continue to be relevant to many in the secular community vis-a-vis the Chief Rabbinate, which under Lau's leadership usually sided with the Orthodox perspective.

== Awards and recognition ==
In 2005, Lau was awarded the Israel Prize for his lifetime achievements and special contribution to society and the State of Israel.

On 14 April 2011, he was awarded the Legion of Honor (France's highest accolade) by French President Nicolas Sarkozy, in recognition of his efforts to promote interfaith dialogue.

== Views ==
"Let's sit down together and let's live together. We always knew how to die together. The time has come for us to know also how to live together, said Lau, calling for co-operation and dialogue between all Jews (Jerusalem, 14 February 1999).

At the 2006 commemoration of the massacre of Babi Yar, Lau pointed out that if the world had reacted, perhaps the Holocaust might never have happened. Implying that Hitler was emboldened by this impunity, Lau speculated:

Maybe, say, this Babi Yar was also a test for Hitler. If on 29 September and 30 September 1941 Babi Yar may happen and the world did not react seriously, dramatically, abnormally, maybe this was a good test for him. So a few weeks later in January 1942, near Berlin in Wannsee, a convention can be held with a decision, a final solution to the Jewish problem. Maybe if the very action had been a serious one, a dramatic one, in September 1941 here in Ukraine, the Wannsee Conference would have come to a different end, maybe

== Published works ==
- The Festival of the Giving of the Torah: Explanations, Halachic insights, customs of the festival of Shavuot, Megilath Ruth, Akdomut. Machon Massoret Yeshivat Chayei Moshe. 1993.
- Practical Judaism. Philipp Feldheim, 1997. ISBN 0-87306-827-0
- Do Not Raise a Hand Against the Boy (2000) is a memoir about his experiences in the Holocaust, released on the 55th anniversary of Buchenwald's liberation
- Rav Lau on Pirkei Avos. Mesorah Publications. 2006. ISBN 1-4226-0069-6. 3 volumes
- Yachel Yisrael Shaelot u'Tshuvot
- Out of the Depths (Sterling Publishing, 2011), is the English translation of his memoir, "Do Not Raise a Hand against the Boy."

== See also ==
- List of Israel Prize recipients

Jewish titles
Preceded by Avraham Shapira	Ashkenazi Chief Rabbi of Israel; 1993–2003	Succeeded by Yona Metzger
