= Lab/Shul =

Jewish congregation in New York City

- Location in Lower Manhattan, New York City

Religion
- Affiliation: Judaism
- Rite: Non-denominational Judaism
- Ecclesiastical or organizational status: Congregation
- Leadership: Rabbi Amichai Lau-Lavie
- Status: Active

Location
- Location: Lower Manhattan, New York City, New York (administration office)
- Country: United States
- Interactive map of Lab/Shul
- Coordinates: 40°43′31″N 74°00′22″W

Architecture
- Founder: Rabbi Amichai Lau-Lavie
- Established: 2012 (as a congregation)

Website
- labshul.org

Lab/Shul is a non-denominational Jewish congregation located in New York City, New York, United States. The congregation was founded by Rabbi Amichai Lau-Lavie, when he was a rabbinical student. It came to fruition in 2012 as an experimental, pop-up synagogue with support from the UJA-Federation, Jewish foundations, and private donors. The intent of the congregation is to experiment with various forms of Jewish practice, hence "Lab" in its name. As of April 2022, it has approximately 300 families as members.

== Overview ==
The organization does not have a permanent location but uses a variety of locations around New York City. Lau-Lavie was originally inspired to found Lab/Shul after serving as an arts educator at B'nai Jeshurun in Manhattan, where he felt that religious services lacked the theatrical aspects necessary to enable participants (particularly children) to connect with the service; he founded a theater group, Storahtelling, that ultimately grew into Lab/Shul.

The organization describes itself as "everybody friendly," and is prominent among LGBTQ Jews; Lau-Lavie is gay. It controversially supported intermarriage as early as 2017 despite Lau-Lavie's ordination as a Conservative rabbi. Lau-Lavie disaffiliated from the Rabbinical Assembly.

Lab/Shul frequently holds its events in the round.

During the COVID-19 pandemic, Lab/Shul experimented with a range of virtual services—including a "Shabbat ShaMorning" service over Zoom in partnership with the Union for Reform Judaism.

Lab/Shul is a member of the Jewish Emergent Network.
