= Eugene Hernandez =

American film festival director and journalist

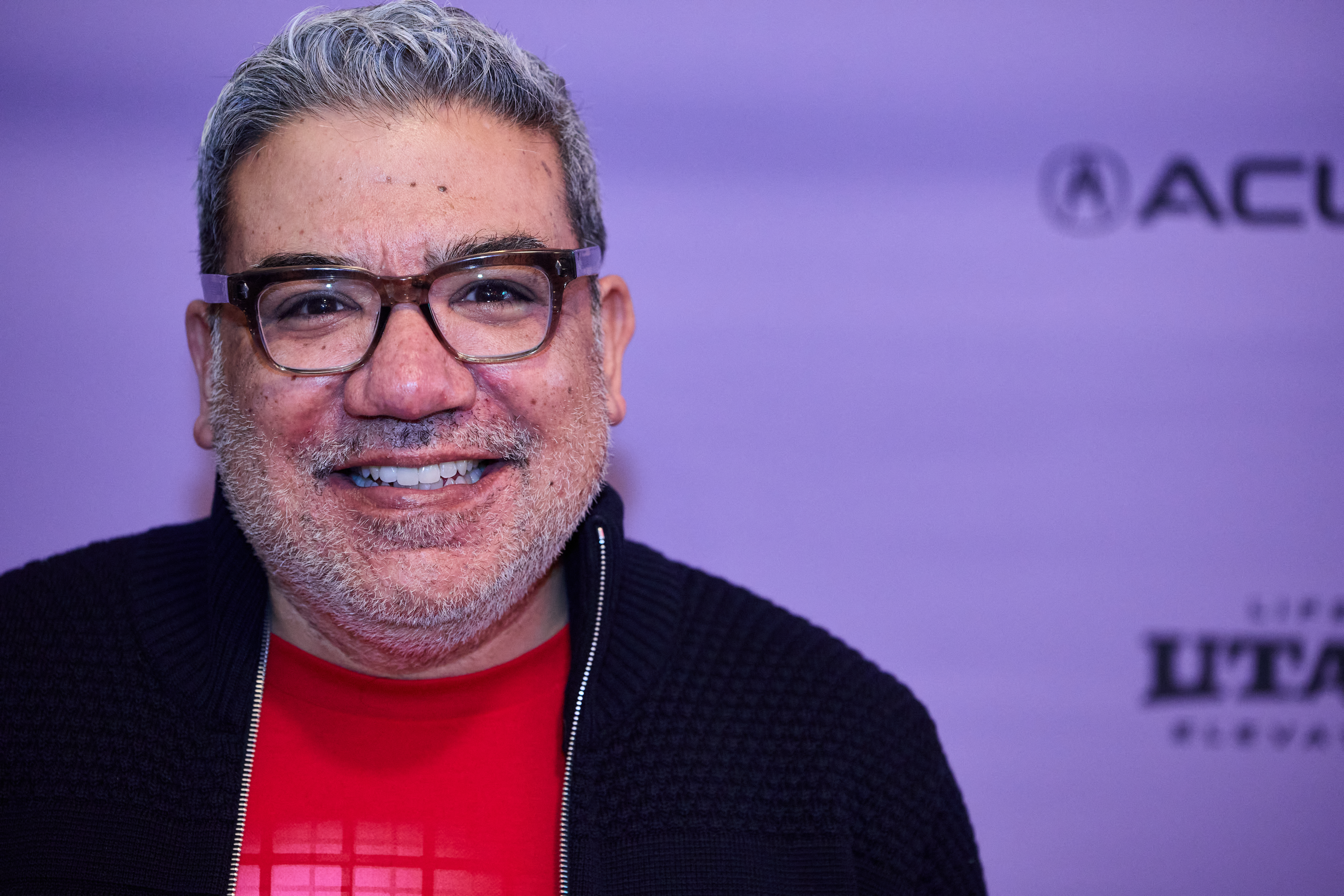
Eugene Hernandez at the Sundance Film Festival 2024

Eugene Hernandez (born October 8, 1968) is an American journalist and non-profit executive, serving as the director of the Sundance Film Festival. He is a co-founder of the online entertainment publication IndieWire and served as its editor in chief until 2010. Hernandez served as the Director of the New York Film Festival, Deputy Executive Director of Film at Lincoln Center (previously known as the Film Society of Lincoln Center) and Publisher of Film Comment until 2022. In 2015 Hernandez was selected as a juror at the annual Sundance Film Festival. He was named Sundance's festival director in 2022; the 2024 edition of the festival was the first under his watch.

In 2014 he was named to the OUT 100 list as one of the top 100 influential people in LGBT community.
