= Storahtelling =

U.S. non-profit organization

- Formation: 1999
- Type: Theatre group
- Location: New York City
- Website: storahtelling.org

Storahtelling is a non-profit organization headquartered in New York City that focuses on promoting Jewish literacy through the application of theater and stagecraft techniques to traditional Jewish texts and stories. The organization provides training in its methodology to professionals and leaders, offers adult classes, presents rituals, ceremonies, staged dramas at synagogues, and community institutions globally.

== Mission and history ==
Storahtelling was founded in 1999 by Amichai Lau-Lavie, an educator, Jewish mythologist, and performance artist. Initially, Storahtelling functioned as a theater troupe. But in 2008, it developed a methodology known as the Maven Method. This method integrated the study of Jewish source texts with Jewish rituals, leading to the transformation of Storahtelling into an education and training institute.

In 2013, Storahtelling introduced Lab/Shul, an initiative that hosts experimental events focusing on Jewish community and learning.

Apart from performing at synagogues and Jewish community centers, Storahtelling has also staged productions at theaters and nightclubs.

The Maven Method draws inspiration from the traditional practice of Torah reading combined with local language translation. Storahtelling mavens learn to interpret not only the words of the Torah but also the social and historical contexts of its stories in contemporary terms. The method involves intensive Torah study to comprehend the spiritual significance and the depth of the text.

== Programs ==
The Maven Method employs performances and training programs to reintroduce the Torah Service to local communities, catering to audiences of various denominations and age groups.

Raising the Bar aims to transform and redefine the B'nai Mitzvah experience for the broader Jewish community, particularly those who are not affiliated with traditional institutions. This is achieved by incorporating the Storahtelling methodology.

StorahStage encompasses fully staged theatrical productions that tour globally, exploring biblical narratives from a contemporary perspective.

== See also ==
- Lab/Shul
