= Naphtali Lau-Lavie =

Israeli author

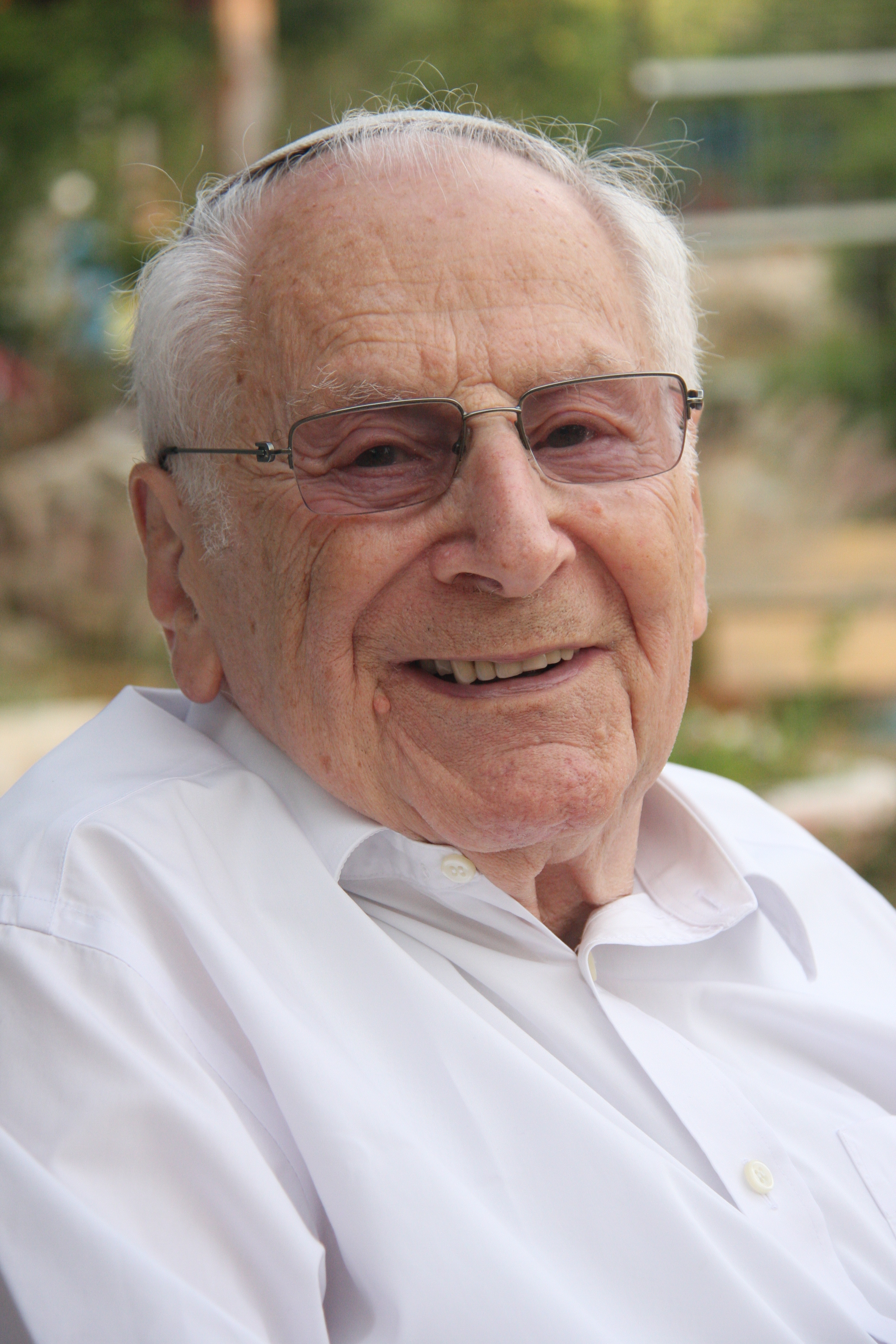

Naphtali Lau-Lavie (sometimes Naphtali Lavie) (Hebrew: נפתלי לואי-לוי; 1926 – December 6, 2014) was an Israeli journalist, author, and diplomat.

== Biography ==
Lavie's entire family was murdered during the Holocaust, with the exception of his younger brother, Yisrael, whose life he saved in the Buchenwald concentration camp, and who would later become the Chief Rabbi of Israel.

== Diplomatic and political career ==
Lavie served as a spokesman for Moshe Dayan, Shimon Peres, and Yitzhak Shamir. In 1981, he was appointed Israel's consul-general in New York City.

== Journalism and literary career ==
Lavie was the author of several books.
