= Homosexuality in India =

Homosexuality in India has existed in traditional native philosophies of the nation, and legal rights continue to be advanced in both mainstream and regional politics. Homosexual cohabitation is legally permitted in India, including some legal protections and rights.

Various artworks and literary works attest to the presence of homosexuality in ancient India. There were no known strict legal restrictions against homosexuality up until Islamic rule and European colonialism. Some scholars believe that discrimination against homosexuality was largely imported through Islam and Christian-derived morality during European colonialism, starting in the second millennium and ultimately culminating in the 17th-century Fatawa-e-Alamgiri of the Mughal Empire and the 19th-century Indian Penal Code of the British Empire.

The modern criminalization of homosexuality was established by the Indian Penal Code, imposing Victorian morality on Indian subjects under the British Raj in 1860. After a nine-year period of legal battles, a part of Section 377 of the Indian Penal Code was eventually struck down by the Supreme Court of India on 7 September 2018, making homosexual sex legal again. However, parts of Section 377 that could be used to prosecute homosexual rape of adults remained. With the replacement of the Indian Penal Code by the Bharatiya Nyaya Sanhita in December 2023, there is no longer any language equivalent to Section 377, and as a result, homosexual rape ceased to be illegal throughout India.

Estimates of the LGBTQ population vary significantly, with the Government of India submitting a figure of "at least 2.5 million" in 2012, and activists estimating around 125 million LGBTQ people.

Homophobia is prevalent in India. Public discussion of homosexuality in India has been inhibited by the fact that sexuality in any form is rarely discussed openly. However, in recent years, attitudes towards homosexuality have shifted slightly. In particular, there have been more depictions and discussions of homosexuality in the Indian media and cinema. Before the colonial-era law was struck down, several organisations expressed support for decriminalising homosexuality in India, and pushed for tolerance and social equality for lesbian, gay, bisexual, transgender, queer people, and others with marginalised identities traditional to India. India is among the countries with a social element of a third gender.

Mental, physical, emotional and economic violence against the LGBTQ community in India remains a problem. Lacking support from family, society or police, many victims of homosexual rape choose not to report the crimes.

According to Equaldex, India received a score of 60 out of 100 in LGBTQ rights, and ranked 5th among 44 Asian countries that were assessed.

== Demographics ==
Estimates of the LGBTQ population vary, with the conservative Government of India submitting a figure of "at least 2.5 million" in 2012, a year when homosexuality was still illegal in India, based on self-declaration. However, gay rights activists and global estimates believe they number at no less than 10% of the population, or more than 135 million.

Multinational research firm Ipsos released a report on the LGBT+ Pride 2021 Global Survey conducted between 23 April and 7 May 2021. The survey was conducted as a 620-market survey by Ipsos on its global advisor platform through interviews with a small sample of almost 50,000 individuals in India. The report shows that 17% of the Indian population identify as non-heterosexual: 3% identify as gay or lesbian, 9% identify as bisexual, 1% identify as pansexual, and 2% identify as asexual (the remaining 2% as "other"). 69% identified as heterosexual (excluding "do not know", and "prefer not to answer").

== History ==
There were no legal restrictions on homosexuality or trans sexuality for the general population of India prior to the early modern period and colonialism. However, certain dharmic moral codes forbade sexual misconduct (of both heterosexual and homosexual nature) among the upper class of priests and monks, and religious codes of foreign religions, such as Christianity and Islam, imposed rules against homosexual practices on their populations.

Several ancient Hindu texts have passages that condemn homosexuality and subject it to punishment. For example, Manusmriti (11.174) says that if a man has sex with another man, then he should take a shower with clothes on. The implication of the statement is that sex between two men was not considered normal. The Dharmashastra and Arthashastra condemn non-vaginal sex in religious or moral terms and expects the ruler to fight against the "social evil". The ninth chapter of the Kama Sutra of Vātsyāyana—composed in around 4th century BC—talks about oral sexual acts (Auparistaka), homosexuality and also of similar activities among transgender people (tritiya prakriti).

Though homophobia was largely imported from the Western world during the medieval period, it is highly likely that the northwestern fringes of the Indian subcontinent, now part of Pakistan, had sociocultural norms heavily influenced by Zoroastrianism (from around 500 BCE) and Islam (from around 700 CE). In contrast, large parts of the far south that are now part of South India and Sri Lanka did not have legal restrictions against homosexuality until the advent of European colonialism.

Homosexuals in the Islamic communities were persecuted more severely, especially under the Islamic rule of the Mughal Empire, though some Mughal leaders tolerated the cultures of the various Non-Muslim communities of India.

From the early modern period, European colonisation imposed Christian-European morals on India, establishing centralized legal codes such as the criminalisation of homosexual sex and trans-sexuality.

In the 21st century, following India's independence, there has been a significant amount of progress made on liberalising LGBTQ laws and reversing the homophobia and transphobia of the previous colonial era.

There are punishments for homosexual sex listed in numerous texts used within contemporary Hinduism. These punishments, regardless of whether they are aimed are heterosexuality or homosexuality, were not originally aimed at the lay people.

The Arthashastra, an ancient Indian treatise on statecraft, mentions a wide variety of sexual practices which, whether performed with a man or a woman, were sought to be punished with the lowest grade of fine. While homosexual intercourse was not permitted, it was treated as a very minor offence, and several kinds of heterosexual intercourse outside of procreation were punished more severely. Sex between non-virgin women incurred a small fine, while homosexual intercourse between men could be made up for merely with a bath with one's clothes on, and a penance of "eating the five products of the cow and keeping a one-night fast".

=== Islamic empires ===
The Fatawa-e-Alamgiri of the Mughal Empire mandated a common set of punishments for homosexuality, which could include 50 lashes for a slave, 100 for a free infidel, or death by stoning for a Muslim.

=== Section 377 ===
Section 377 of the Indian Penal Code (IPC), dating back to 1860 (enforced from 1862), made sexual activities "against the order of nature" punishable by law and carries a life sentence. The law replaced the variety of punishments for Zina (unlawful intercourse) mandated in the Mughal empire's Fatawa-e-Alamgiri. Similarly, the Goa Inquisition once prosecuted the capital crime of sodomy in Portuguese India, but not lesbian acts.

==== Support for decriminalisation ====
Among others, Akkai Padmashali was influential in the protests and demonstrations that eventually led to the repeal of Section 377 of the Indian Penal Code. She started the organisation "Ondede" in 2014, which envisioned a society that is non-discriminatory and gender-just. Ondede, meaning "convergence" in Kannada, indicates Padmashali's vision for the society of India as a whole, with a mission "To create a space for dialogue, support and strengthen action to visibilise issues of dignity, voice and sexuality in relation to children, women, and sexual minorities". The organization develops partnerships with community groups through social movements and engagement with the state, and conduct research.

Several organisations, including the Naz Foundation (India) Trust, the National AIDS Control Organisation, Law Commission of India, Union Health Ministry, National Human Rights Commission of India and the Planning Commission of India have expressed support for decriminalizing homosexuality in India.

In September 2006, Nobel Laureate Amartya Sen, acclaimed writer Vikram Seth and other prominent Indians publicly demanded the repeal of section 377 of the IPC. The open letter demanded that "In the name of humanity and of our Constitution, this cruel and discriminatory law should be struck down." On 30 June 2008, Indian Labour Minister Oscar Fernandes backed calls for decriminalisation of consensual gay sex, and Prime Minister Manmohan Singh called for greater tolerance towards homosexuals. On 23 July 2008, Bombay High Court Judge Bilal Nazki said that India's unnatural sex law should be reviewed. The Law Commission of India had historically favoured the retention of this section in its 42nd and 156th reports, but in its 172nd report, delivered in 2000, it recommended its repeal.

On 9 August 2008, then health minister, Anbumani Ramadoss began his campaign for changing Section 377 of the Indian Penal Code, which defines homosexuality as an unnatural act and thus illegal. At the International AIDS Conference in Mexico City, he said, "Section 377 of IPC, which criminalises men who have sex with men, must go." His ministerial portfolio had put him at odds with the Indian Home Minister Shivraj Patil and several other ministers in seeking to scrap Section 377. In late 2008, he changed his argument saying he does not want the scrapping of Section 377 but a mere modification of the law treating homosexuality as a criminal offence punishable up to life imprisonment. He said he wants Prime Minister Manmohan Singh to resolve the matter, while he wanted to avoid discord with the home ministry, who said the altered law would then result in an increase in criminal incidences of sodomy or offences involving sexual abuse of children, particularly boys. In doing so he alleged that the law even penalises health workers who treat homosexuals, while making this a cognisable and non-bailable offence.

Various Hindu organisations based in India and abroad have supported the decriminalisation of homosexual behaviours. In 2009, the Hindu Council UK became one of the first major religious organisations to support LGBT rights when it issued the statement "Hinduism does not condemn homosexuality". Ravi Shankar, a prominent Hindu spiritual leader, has condemned Section 377 in a series of tweets, maintaining that "Hinduism has never considered homosexuality a crime" and "to brand a person a criminal based on sexual preference would be absurd".

The United Nations has urged India to decriminalise homosexuality, stating it would help the fight against HIV/AIDS by allowing intervention programmes, much like the ones in China and Brazil. Jeffrey O'Malley, director of the United Nations Development Programme (UNDP) on HIV/AIDS, has stated that countries which protect men who have sex with men (MSM) have double the rate of coverage of HIV prevention services, as much as 60%. According to O'Malley, criminalisation hinders universal access to essential HIV, health, and social services. In later talks with The Hindu in November 2008, he expressed concerns that the then-in-power United Progressive Alliance government was in a difficult position regarding amending Section 377, due to the upcoming elections which could lead to changes being misrepresented. He further emphasised the need to change the laws and sensitise the police and judiciary, claiming that the removal of discriminatory laws would provide marginalised groups better access to treatment and prevention facilities such as condoms. He stated that India had succeeded in checking the spread of AIDS through commercial sex workers, however transmission through gay sex and injectable-drug use was still an area of concern in the country.

In December 2013, the Samajwadi Party stated that, "homosexuality is unethical and immoral" in response to a court decision upholding the constitutional validity of criminalizing homosexuality.

In July 2014, a book on LGBTQIA and gender-queer rights published by Srishti Madurai was released by Vanathi Srinivasan, the general secretary of the BJP in Tamil Nadu. The move has been considered encouraging by members of the LGBTQIA community.

Bharatiya Janata Party senior leader Arun Jaitley stated in February 2014 that he supported decriminalisation of homosexuality. On 13 January 2015, BJP spokesperson Shaina NC, appearing on NDTV, stated, "We BJP are for decriminalising homosexuality. That is the progressive way forward."

Rashtriya Swayamsevak Sangh spokesperson Ram Madhav, in an interview with national daily Business Standard, said in May 2014: "But I can say this – that while glorification of certain forms of social behaviour is not something we endorse, the penalising and criminalisation aspects need to be looked into. Whether to call homosexuality a crime and treat it as one in this day and age is questionable." In January 2023, RSS chief Mohan Bhagwat stated that the LGBTQ community "should have their own private and social space as they are humans and have the right to live as others". The Sangh's views, however, are noted to be discomforting in more conservative factions.

In December 2015, Socialist Samajwadi Party Minister Azam Khan who was the then Uttar Pradesh Minister for Urban Development labelled the RSS members as "homosexuals" claiming that it was the reason for their supposed state of un-marriage. He made these derogatory remarks after learning of the then Finance Minister Arun Jaitley's and the BJP's support for decriminalisation of homosexuality. His local media in-charge Fasahat Ali Khan Shannu claimed that "the remarks of the minister are unnecessarily blown out of proportion. By referring to the RSS, he meant to say that they are the ones reportedly behind the move to decriminalize gay sex in India. There is absolutely no place for such things in our Indian culture. This is what the minister is trying to reinforce" and that "If they are supporting such a move to legalize gay sex then it is quite natural that they endorse the practice, which is perhaps the reason they don't marry."

On 6 March 2016, Srishti Madurai's new website was launched by a Dalit activist and Ambedkarite Ma. Venkatesan from the BJP in the presence of Central Minister Pon Radhakrishnan, Vanathi Srinivasan, Aravindan Neelakandan, Joe D'Cruz and scores of Rashtriya Swayamsevak Sangh volunteers at Chennai.

In March 2018, Partha Chatterjee, the then Education Minister of West Bengal from the Trinamool Congress said that "Lesbianism is against Bengali Culture"

In September 2018, Dravidianist DMK Treasurer Duraimurugan labelled gay marriages as most barbaric.

In September 2018, Islamist AIMIM Head and MP Asaduddin Owaisi, demanded that the Government overturn the criminalisation of Triple Talaq after India's Supreme Court decriminalized homosexuality.

In September 2022, Former Journalist and Trinamool Congress MP Kunal Ghosh, equated homosexuality to perversion to derogatorily describe the death of Opposition Leader Suvendhu Adhikari's bodyguard. He said, "Adhikari tried to approach one of his bodyguards with his perverse sexual advances, and later that bodyguard was found dead under mysterious circumstances". This was met with a protest by queer rights activists.

In December 2022, Abdurahiman Randathani, a former legislator from the Indian Union Muslim League claimed that "in the name of sexual education, the government was encouraging homosexuality and pervert acts like masturbation."

==== Court proceedings and recent political legislation ====
In December 2002, Naz Foundation filed a Public Interest Litigation (PIL) to challenge IPC Section 377 in the Delhi High Court. On 4 July 2008, the Delhi High Court noted that there was "nothing unusual" in holding a gay rally, something which is common outside India.

On 2 July 2009, in the case of Naz Foundation v National Capital Territory of Delhi, the High Court of Delhi struck down much of S. 377 of the IPC as being unconstitutional. The Court held that to the extent S. 377 criminalised consensual non-vaginal sexual acts between adults, it violated an individual's fundamental rights to equality before the law, freedom from discrimination and to life and personal liberty under Articles 14, 15 and 21 of the Constitution of India. The High Court did not strike down Section 377 completely. It held the section to be valid in case of non-consensual non-vaginal intercourse or to intercourse with minors, and it expressed the hope that Parliament would legislatively address the issue.

On 11 December 2013, in response to an appeal filed by an astrologer Suresh Kumar Koushal and others, the Supreme Court of India upheld the constitutionality of Section 377 of the IPC, and stated that the Court was instead deferring to Indian legislators to provide the sought-after clarity.

On 28 January 2014, the Supreme Court dismissed the review petition filed by the Central Government, Naz Foundation and several others, against its 11 December verdict on Section 377 of the IPC.

In January 2015, the National Crime Records Bureau (NCRB) said that, according to data collected, 778 cases were filed under Section 377 of IPC, and 587 arrests were made in 2014 until October after the Supreme Court verdict. Some states are yet to submit their full data.

On 18 December 2015, Shashi Tharoor, a member of the Indian National Congress, introduced a Private Members Bill for the decriminalisation of Section 377 of the Indian Penal Code in the Lok Sabha, but the motion was rejected by the house by a vote of 71–24 with one abstention.

On 12 March 2016, Tharoor once again introduced a Private Members Bill for the decriminalisation of Section 377. However, the motion for introduction was again defeated by a vote of 58–14 with one abstention.

On 2 February 2016, the Supreme Court agreed to reconsider its 2013 judgment; it said it would refer petitions to abolish Section 377 to a five-member constitutional bench, which would conduct a comprehensive hearing of the issue.

On 24 August 2016, a draft law to ban commercial surrogacy was cleared by the Union Cabinet and announced by Sushma Swaraj, the Minister of External Affairs (India). The draft bill denied homosexuals the right to have surrogate children, with Swaraj stating, "We do not recognise live-in and homosexual relationships ... this is against our ethos".

On 24 August 2017, the Supreme Court held that the right to individual privacy is an "intrinsic" and fundamental right under the Constitution of India. In its 547-page decision on privacy rights, the nine-judge bench also held that "sexual orientation is an essential attribute of privacy". The judgement noted, "Discrimination against an individual on the basis of sexual orientation is deeply offensive to the dignity and self-worth of the individual. Equality demands that the sexual orientation of each individual in society must be protected on an even platform. The right to privacy and the protection of sexual orientation lie at the core of the fundamental rights guaranteed by Articles 14, 15 and 21 of the Constitution."

On 10 July 2018, the Supreme Court reaffirmed the importance of the rights of the LGBT community. Justice D. Y. Chandrachud, in the proceedings of the court, held that choosing a partner was every person's fundamental right.

On 6 September 2018, the Supreme Court struck down the part of section 377, a British-era provision, hu consensual homosexual activities. The court upheld that other aspects of section 377 criminalising unnatural sex with minors and animals will remain in force.

== Politics ==
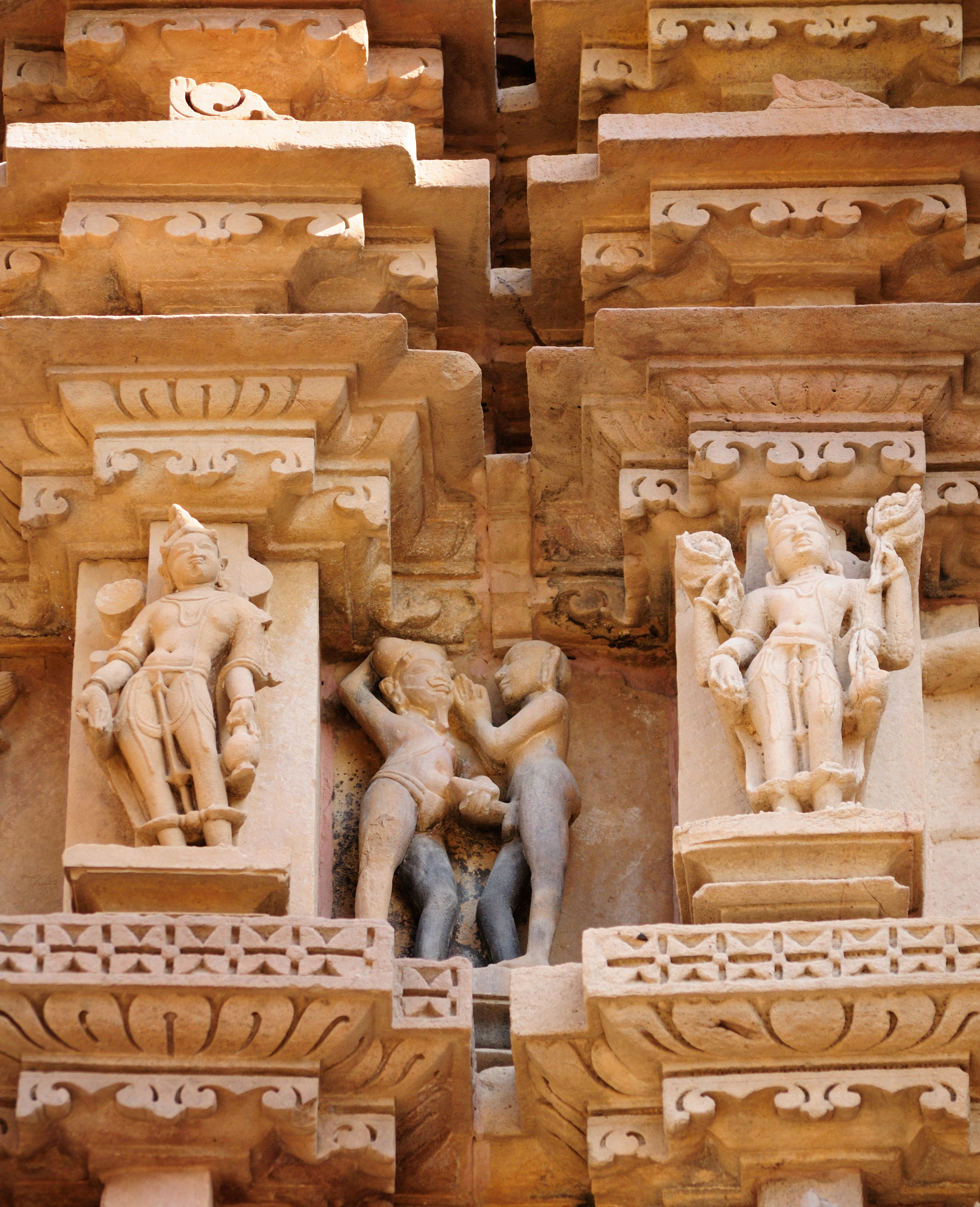
Erotic sculptures of two men (centre) at the Khajuraho temples

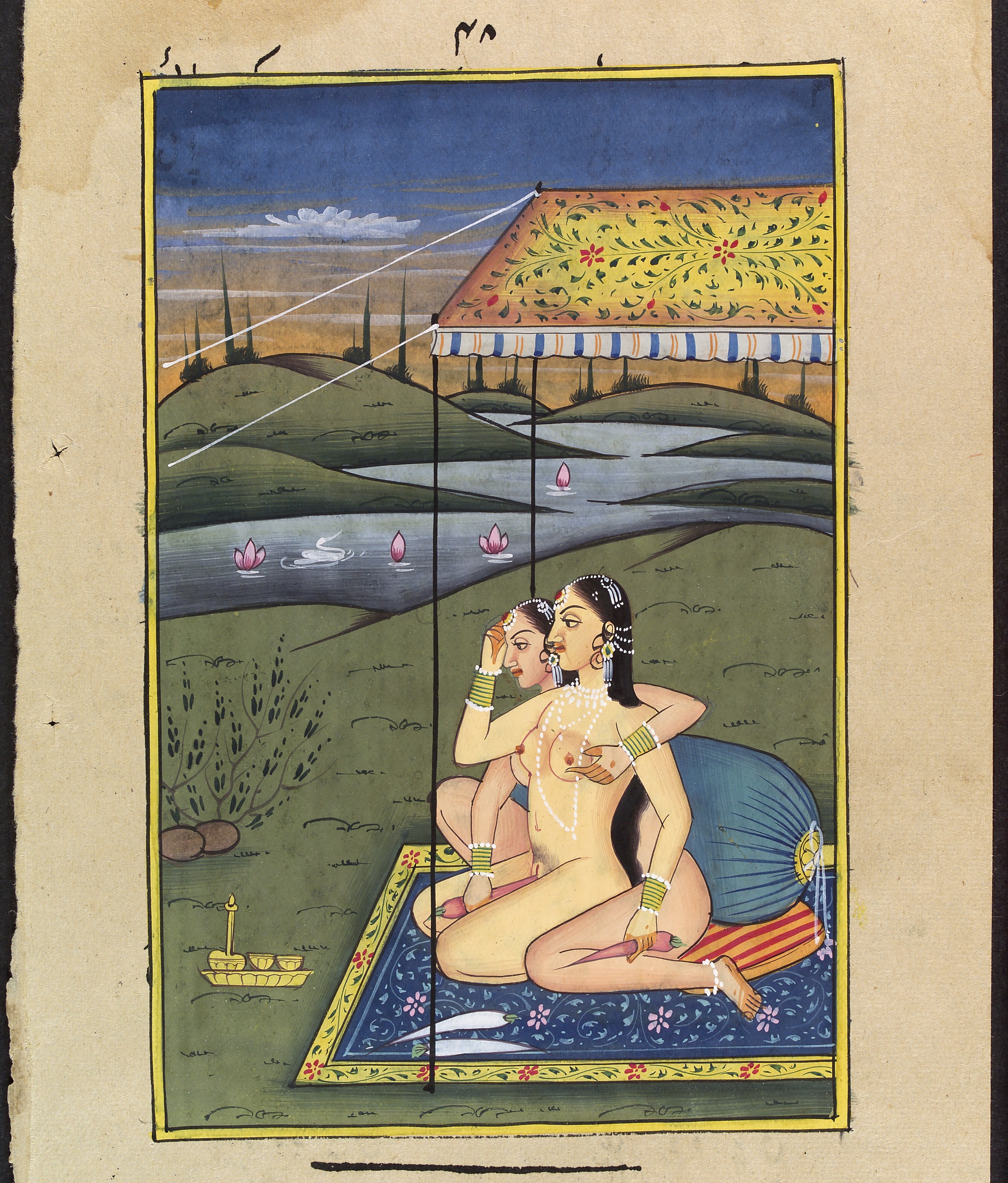
Two women using carrots as dildos, 20th century gouache painting

=== Legal status ===
==== Sexual intercourse ====
On 6 September 2018, consensual gay sex was legalised by India's Supreme Court. Furthermore, the BJP refused the cross-parliamentary recommendation to transfer Section 377 to the Bharatiya Nyaya Sanhita, effectively decriminalising the specific section that referred to homosexual conduct. However, under the new Code, only women or children of any sex, could be victims of rape.

==== Expression ====
On 24 August 2017, India's Supreme Court gave the country's LGBT community the freedom to safely express their sexual orientation. Therefore, an individual's sexual orientation is protected under the country's Right to Privacy law. However, the Supreme Court did not directly overturn any laws criminalising same-sex relationships, which were later overturned in 2018.

==== Cohabitation ====
Cohabitation of same-sex couples is legal in India. They have been granted a handful of cohabitation protections and family rights. Despite the criminalisation of homosexual acts under the Indian Penal Code of 1860, cohabitation was never an offence in India. In 2019, in the case of Shampa Singha v. State of West Bengal, the Calcutta High Court stated that cohabiting among two consenting adults of the same sex cannot be illegal, far less a crime.

===== Recognition of same-sex couples =====
In February 2017, the Ministry of Health and Family Welfare unveiled resource materials on health issues to be used as part of a nationwide adolescent peer-education plan called Saathiya. Among other subjects, the material discusses homosexuality. The material states, "Yes, adolescents frequently fall in love. They can feel attracted to a friend or any individual of the same or opposite sex. It is normal to have special feelings for someone. It is important for adolescents to understand that such relationships are based on mutual consent, trust, transparency, and respect. It is alright to talk about such feelings to the person for whom you have them, but always in a respectful manner."

India provides some legal recognition of homosexual partnerships as live-in relationships. It does not provide for legal marriages, common law marriages, guardianship, civil unions, or issue partnership certificates, though same-sex couples can attain the rights and benefits as a live-in couple (analogous to cohabitation) as per the Supreme Court of India landmark decision Deepika Singh v. Central Administrative Tribunal in August 2022. There are a number of companies that provide services to homosexuals in live-in relationships such as financial services and healthcare services.

Hinduism traditionally believed that there is no role for the state in marriage and that it was a private/societal issue to be dealt with locally. Marriage was codified in the legal system through the Hindu Marriage Law under the British Raj, though this did not perfectly reflect the original marriages conducted before that time, and it governed divorce proceedings, and the colonial laws only allowed for heterosexual marriages to be performed. Despite the legal requirement to register a marriage with the government, the vast majority of Hindu marriages are not registered with the government and are instead conducted through unwritten common law.

Several same-sex couples have married in traditional Hindu ceremonies; however, these marriages were not able to be registered, and couples do not attain all the same rights and benefits as heterosexual married couples.

Buddhism considers marriage to be a secular issue or a social contract, and therefore not a religious matter. There is no official marriage service, and marriage customs are often adopted from local cultural traditions, for example, with Andi Fian arguing that prohibitions against homosexual marriage in Confucianism may have influenced Chinese Buddhism.

Since the 2010s, courts in several states, including Gujarat, Himachal Pradesh, Kerala, Odisha, Punjab, Uttar Pradesh and Uttarakhand, have ruled on an individual basis that cohabitation (also known as "live-in relationships") between same-sex couples is not unlawful and entitled to legal protection. This has often only entailed limited inheritance benefits or police protection from the family.

The Supreme Court in 2022 provided limited equal rights to those in live-in relationships while also recognising homosexual live-in couples as being part of a familial unit.

On 17 October 2023, the Supreme Court of India unanimously voted against the legalisation of same-sex marriage, but reiterated the rights of LGBT citizens under the Constitution and empowered parliament or state legislatures to enact their own laws to "meet challenges" faced by the LGBT community and regulate rights.

The ruling government of the BJP/NDA's position on the recognition of same-sex relationships is to address the "human concerns" about same-sex couples within the context of Hinduism by providing equal financial and legal rights. The sources stated that the recognition of same-sex marriage would require the backing of all religious groups. Conversely, the Indian National Congress party manifesto promised to enact same-sex civil unions if it gains control of the Lok Sabha in the 2024 Indian general election. In the 2026 Rajya Sabha elections, lawyer Menaka Guruswamy became India's first openly LGBTQ+ national-level member of Parliament, elected on behalf of the Trinamool Congress.

=== Community attitudes ===
==== Islamophobia ====
Muslims have described that it is "difficult" to be a Muslim in India's LGBTQ spaces. Some LGBTQ Muslims describe feeling pressured to disassociate themselves from Islam.

An opinion poll of the LGBTQ community found that 50% supported the ruling BJP party, with only 25% supporting the left-wing party. There have been several BJP politicians who have voiced support for the LGBTQ community yet engaged in hate speech against Muslims.

A number of conservative religious organizations in South Asia have voiced support for LGBTQ rights, including the Buddhist Asgirya Chapter in Sri Lanka and the Hindu RSS in India.

== Culture ==
=== Pride parades ===
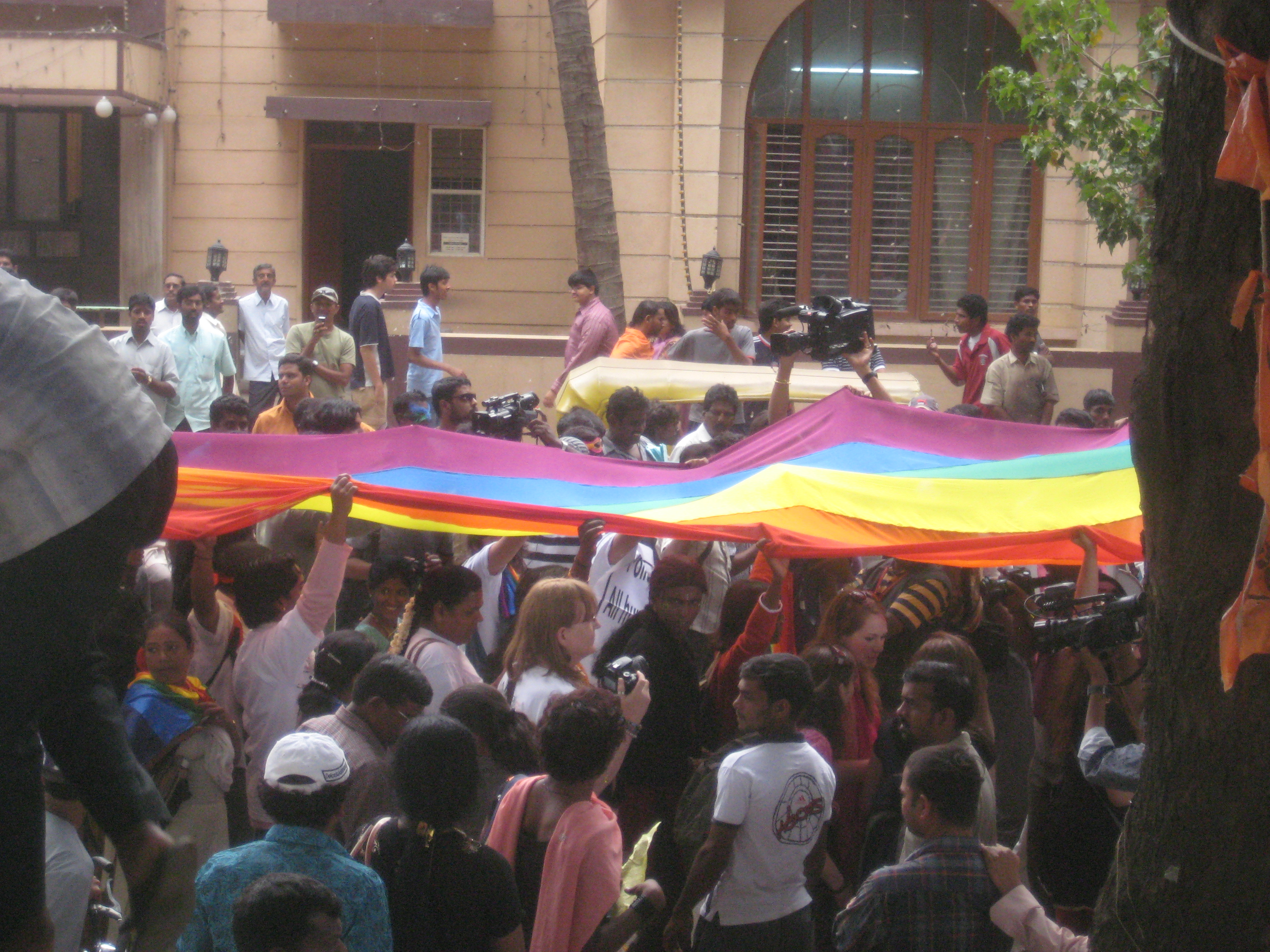
Gay Pride March in Bangalore (2013)

In 2005, Prince Manvendra Singh Gohil, publicly came out as gay. He was immediately disinherited by the royal family, though they eventually reconciled. He appeared on the American talk show The Oprah Winfrey Show on 24 October 2007, and on BBC Three's Undercover Princes. In 2008, Zoltan Parag, a competitor at the Mr. Gay International contest, said that he was apprehensive about returning to India. He said, "Indian media has exposed me so much that now when I call my friends back home, their parents do not let them talk to me".

On 29 June 2008, five Indian cities (Delhi, Bangalore, Kolkata, Indore and Pondicherry) celebrated gay pride parades. About 2,000 people turned out in these nationwide parades. Mumbai held its pride march on 16 August 2008, with Bollywood actress Celina Jaitley flagging off the festivities. On 4 July 2008, the Delhi High Court, while hearing the case to decriminalise homosexuality, opined that there was nothing unusual in holding a gay rally, something which is common outside India.

Days after the 2 July 2009 Delhi High Court verdict legalising homosexuality, Pink Pages, India's first online LGBT magazine, was released. On 16 April 2009, India's first gay magazine Bombay Dost, originally launched in 1990, was relaunched by Celina Jaitley in Mumbai.

On 27 June 2009, Bhubaneswar, the capital city of Odisha, saw its first gay pride parade. A day later, Union Law Minister Veerappa Moily announced that the Union Home Minister had convened a meeting with the Union Law Ministers, Union Health Ministers and Home Ministers of all states to evolve a consensus on decriminalising homosexuality in India. On 28 June 2009, Delhi and Bangalore held their second gay pride parades, and Chennai, generally considered to be a very conservative city, held its first.

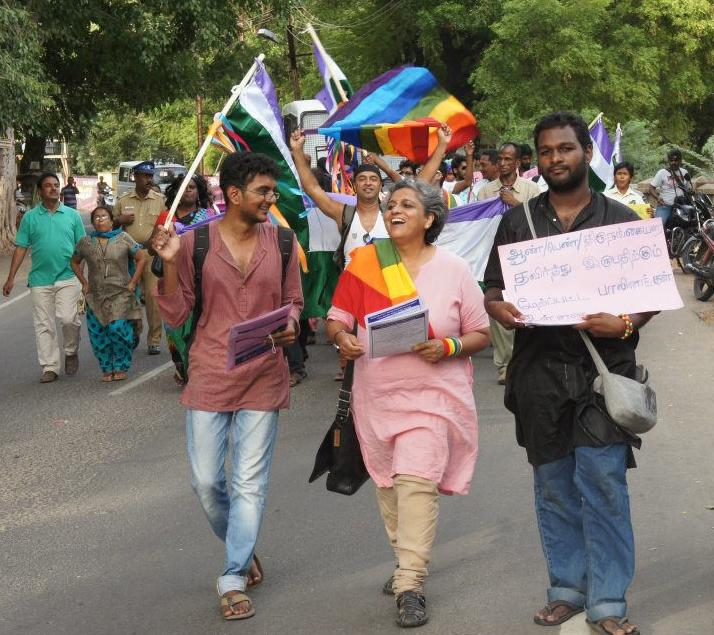
Asia's first Genderqueer Pride Parade at Madurai with Anjali Gopalan and Gopi Shankar Madurai

Madurai celebrated its first LGBTQ Rainbow festival on 29 July 2012. Anjali Gopalan inaugurated the Alan Turing Rainbow festival and flagged off Asia's first genderqueer pride parade as a part of the Turing Rainbow festival organised by Srishti Madurai, a literary and resource circle for alternative gender and sexualities. It was established by Gopi Shankar, a student of The American College in Madurai, to eradicate social discrimination faced by the LGBT and genderqueer community. The objective of the organisation is to highlight twenty different types of genders.

On 1 May 2011, Kolkata Rainbow Pride Festival (KRPF) was formed to take the initiative of organising Pride Walk in Kolkata. Since then the initiative of Queer Pride Parade in Kolkata has been taken by KRPF. The 11th Kolkata Rainbow Pride Walk, held on 15 July 2012, was attended by more than 1500 people. Kolkata hosted South Asia's first pride walk in 1999.

Chandigarh held its first LGBT pride parade on 15 March 2013 and it has been held annually ever since.

The first LGBT pride parade in Gujarat state was held at Surat on 6 October 2013.

Rajasthan witnessed its first pride event on 1 March 2015, when a pride walk was held in Jaipur.

Awadh witnessed the first Awadh Pride parade in 2017.

In 2013, India was represented by Nolan Lewis, a model, at the Mr Gay World 2013 contest. He had trouble finding sponsors. Previously, India had been represented at the Mr Gay World by Zoltan Parag Bhaindarkar in the 2008. He did not return to India and reportedly sought asylum in the United States.

Sushant Divgikar, the winner of Mr Gay India 2014, was a contestant on the Bigg Boss reality show. On 26 July 2014, at Kochi the 5th All-Kerala Queer Pride Parade was held. It was organised by Queerala (a support group for the LGBT community) and Sahayathrika (a rights organisation for lesbian and bisexual women in Kerala).

== Social issues ==
=== Religious opposition ===
The 11 December 2013 judgment of the Supreme Court, which upheld Section 377, was supported by religious leaders. The main petitioner in the plea was an astrologer, Suresh Kumar Koushal, and other petitioners were religious organisations such as All India Muslim Personal Law Board, Trust God Missionaries, Krantikari Manuwadi Morcha, Apostolic Churches Alliance, and Utkal Christian Council. The Daily News and Analysis called it "the univocal unity of religious leaders in expressing their homophobic attitude. Usually divisive and almost always seen tearing down each other's religious beliefs, leaders across sections came forward in decrying homosexuality and expressing their solidarity with the judgment." The article added that Baba Ramdev, India's well-known yoga guru, advised the journalists interviewing him not to turn homosexual, and stated he could cure homosexuality through yoga, calling it a bad addiction.

The Vishwa Hindu Parishad's vice-president Om Prakash Singhal said, "This is a right decision, we welcome it. Homosexuality is against Indian culture, against nature, and against science. We are regressing, going back to when we were almost like animals. The SC had protected our culture." Singhal further dismissed HIV/AIDS concerns within the LGBT community saying, "It is understood that when you try to suppress one anomaly, there will be a break-out of a few more."

Maulana Madni, of an Islamic organisation, Jamiat Ulema-e-Hind, has echoed similar sentiments by stating that "Homosexuality is a crime according to scriptures and is unnatural. People cannot consider themselves to be exclusive of a society... In a society, a family is made up of a man and a woman, not a woman and a woman, or a man and a man. If these same-sex couples adopt children, the child will grow up with a skewed version of a family. Society will disintegrate. If we are to look at countries in the West that have allowed same-sex marriages, you will find the mental tensions they suffer from."

Rabbi Ezekiel Isaac Malekar, honorary secretary of the Judah Hyam Synagogue, in upholding the judgement, was also quoted as saying, "In Judaism, our scriptures do not permit homosexuality." Reverend Paul Swarup of the Cathedral Church of the Redemption in Delhi, in stating his views on what he believes to be the unnaturalness of homosexuality, stated "Spiritually, human sexual relations are identified as those shared by a man and a woman. The Supreme Court's view is an endorsement of our scriptures."

=== Conversion therapy ===
In February 2014, the Indian Psychiatric Society (IPS) issued a statement saying there is no evidence to prove that homosexuality is unnatural: "Based on existing scientific evidence and good practice guidelines from the field of psychiatry, the Indian Psychiatric Society would like to state that there is no evidence to substantiate the belief that homosexuality is a mental illness or a disease." In June 2018, IPS reiterated its stance on homosexuality, saying: "Certain people are not cut out to be heterosexual and we don't need to castigate them, we don't need to punish them, to ostracize them".

Despite this statement from the IPS, conversion therapies are still performed in India. These practices usually involve electroconvulsive therapy (which may lead to memory loss), hypnosis, the administration of nausea-inducing drugs, or more commonly talk therapy where the individual is told that homosexuality is caused by "insufficient male affirmation in childhood" or "an uncaring father and an overbearing mother". Conversion therapy can lead to depression, anxiety, seizures, drug use and suicidal tendencies for the individuals involved.

==== S. Sushma v. Commissioner of Police ====
On 28 April 2021, Madras High Court Justice N Anand Venkatesh passed an interim order in response to a petition filed by two young women with the same sex orientation. According to the order, in an unprecedented move, he decided to undergo psycho-education before penning a judgment on same sex relationships.

Justice N Anand Venkatesh said that psycho-educative counseling on queer issues helped him shed his personal ignorance and prejudices. He clearly stated in the judgment that the responsibility to change, the burden of unlearning stigma, and learning about the lived experience of the queer community lies on society and not the queer individuals.

It was I (us), who has to set off on a journey of understanding them and accepting them and shed our notions, and not they who have to turn themselves inside out to suit our notions of social morality and tradition

— Justice N Anand Venkatesh, Page number 50 out of 104

The court recognized that there's an absence of a specific law to protect the interests of queer people and acknowledged it is the responsibility of the constitutional courts to fill this vacuum with necessary directions to ensure the protection of such couples from harassment sourced from stigma and prejudices.

Till the legislature comes up with an enactment, the LGBTQIA+ community cannot be left in a vulnerable atmosphere where there is no guarantee for their protection and safety.

— Justice N Anand Venkatesh, Page number 55 out of 104

On 7 June 2021, in delivering the verdict on this case, Justice N Anand Venkatesh prohibited Conversion Therapy in Tamil Nadu and Puducherry. He suggested comprehensive measures to sensitise society and various branches of the State including the Police and judiciary to remove prejudices against the LGBTQIA+ community. He suggested that changes be made to the curricula of schools and universities to educate students on understanding the LGBTQIA+ community.

== See also ==
- LGBTQ culture in India
- LGBTQ rights in India
- Category:Indian LGBTQ people
- Hijra (South Asia)
- Kothi (gender)

=== Organisations ===
- Trikone

=== Religious views ===
- Hinduism and LGBTQ topics
- LGBTQ themes in Hindu mythology
- Buddhism and sexual orientation
- Sikhism and sexual orientation
- Zoroastrianism and sexual orientation
- LGBTQ people in Islam
- Christianity and homosexuality
- Homosexuality and the Bahá'í Faith

=== Media ===
- The World of Homosexuals by Shakuntala Devi the "Human Computer", 1977
- Pink Pages, India's National LGBTQ magazine
- Gaylaxy
- Fire

=== Related ===
- Catamite
- Greek love
- History of erotic depictions
- History of human sexuality
- History of homosexuality
- Homosexuality in ancient Greece
- Homosexuality in ancient Rome
- Homosexuality in China
- Homosexuality in Japan
- Human rights in India
- Kagema
- Male sexuality
- Pederasty in ancient Greece
- Sexuality in India
- Wakashū
- LGBTQ rights in Goa
