= Timeline of Tamil sexual minorities =

Events impacting the welfare of Tamil sexual minorities

The following list is a partially completed compilation of events considered to have a profound effect on the welfare or image of Tamil sexual minorities. The use of bold typeface indicates that the event is widely considered to be landmark:

== Timeline ==
3rd century BC to c. 4th century AD

- Tamil Sangam literature refers to relationships between two men and explores the lives of trans women in the Aravan cult in Koovagam village in Tamil Nadu.

=== 1800s ===
- 1862: The colonial law criminalizing homosexual sex is implemented by Lord Thomas Macaulay through the Indian Penal Code in British India and the Straits Settlements.

=== 1990s ===
- 1986: Screening of My Beautiful Laundrette at British Council where same-sex love is depicted on the big screen for the first time in Chennai.
- 1990: Tamil Nadu government forcibly tested several hundred sex workers and then locked up 800 infected women for several months.
- 1993: Publication of Robert Oostvogels and Sunil Menon's mimeograph Men Who Have Sex With Men-Assessment of situation in Madras was prepared for the government of Tamil Nadu
- 1993: Sekar Balasubramaniam, a volunteer for Community AIDS Network (CAN), comes out as gay and HIV-positive.
- 1998: Sahodaran, first group for sexual minorities formed in Chennai.
- 1999: Mailing list gaychennai started on yahoogroups.com as the first list for the Chennai gay community.
- 1999: The essay 'Queer Madras of the mid-80s' circulated on Indian LGBT lists.

=== 2000s ===
- 2003: Movenpick group formed, later renamed Orinam, and mailing list started.
- 2004: First Chennai LGBT film festival, Alliance-Francaise and SAATHII, with volunteer support from Orinam.
- 2005: The Many Colours of Love: LGBT documentary festival, Alliance Francaise and SAATHII, with volunteer support from Orinam.
- 2006: Conference on third gender organized by Nalamdana.
- 2006: The website Orinam.net is launched.
- 2006: March for transgender rights while legislative assembly is in session in Tamil Nadu, organized by Sangama, THAA, SWAM, and other groups. Catalyzed Tamil Nadu government initiatives for transgender welfare.
- 2006: Suicide by self-immolation of transgender teenager Pandiammal/Pandian, sexually abused by Chennai police.
- 2007: Madras High Court ruling in Jayalakshmi vs. State of Tamil Nadu by AP Shah.
- 2007: Sangama establishes Chennai chapter.
- 2007: Police advocacy on sexuality issues initiated by Tamil Nadu AIDS Control Society, implemented by community groups.
- 2007: Shakti Resource Centre formed and organizes film series - Desire and Sexuality at the LV Prasad Film and TV Academy.
- 2008: Rose Venkatesan becomes the first transgender woman talk show host on Chennai television.
- 2008: Double-suicide of Christy and Rukmini.
- 2008: Peer-counseling preparatory workshop (4 sessions: June 8, June 15, June 22, July 6) of Shakthi Resource Centre in collaboration with Sahayatrika, Sahodaran, Orinam/MP, and Lotus Sangam.
- 2008: Aravani (Transgender) Welfare Board constituted by state government.

==== 2009 ====
- A same-sex wedding is held in South Africa according to Hindu rites.
- Thirunangai.net, the world's first matrimonial website for trans women, is launched by Kalki Subramaniam of the Sahodari Foundation.
- Peer-counseling multi-weekend course of Shakthi Resource Centre and Center for Counseling.
- Public screening of Milk, organized by the U.S. Consulate at Film Chamber, as part of the Oscars film festival.
- The High Court of Delhi suspends the colonial-era law banning homosexuality.
- The Hindu Council of Britain announces that Hinduism does not condemn homosexuality.
- The Hindu, national newspaper published from Chennai, features editorial in support of LGBT rights post-Naz decision.
- First Chennai Rainbow Pride March.
- Campaign for Open Minds launched.
- Chennai Rainbow Coalition started.
- First meet for parents of LGBT people in Chennai organised by Center for Counseling.
- Reverend George Zachariah delivers inspiring sermon at Gurukul Chapel calling on Christians to be inclusive of LGBT people.
- Transgender woman, Narthaki Nataraj, conferred Nrityachoodamani title by Krishna Gana Sabha.

=== 2010s ===
==== 2010 ====
- First edition of 'Our Children'/'Nam Kuzhanthaigal' booklet for parents of LGBT children released by Orinam.
- Chennai Dost formed.
- Launch of Tamil edition of the Love That Dare Speak Its Name post-377 anthology by Sangama Chennai.
- RIOV, a social group for lesbians and bisexual women.
- September: Skandaraj Navaratnam is murdered by former partner and serial killer Bruce McArthur in Toronto, Canada.

==== 2011 ====
- Srishti Madurai formed as India's first student volunteer LGBTQIA educational research foundation.
- Maatruveli (மாற்றுவெளி), a Tamil academic journal brings out a special issue on sexuality, guest edited by Ponni and Aniruddhan Vasudevan.
- Chennai Dost website launched.
- Chemistry Club campus groups launched by Chennai Dost.
- Public protests against homophobic remarks made by Union Health Minister Ghulam Nabi Azad.
- Srishti Madurai launches India's first helpline for Genderqueer, LGBTQIA at Madurai.

==== 2012 ====
- Asia's first Genderqueer pride parade and Alan Turing centenary celebrations commenced at Madurai in July 2012.
- Reading group called Orinam's Quilt is launched.
- First LGBT education fest for school students launched by Srishti Madurai at Madurai. It was attended by 600 school students.
- Gopi Shankar Madurai of Srishti Madurai becomes the youngest panelist to share a chair at the University Grants Commission's sponsored seminars on gender and sexuality that have been taking place in Tamil Nadu since 2012–2014.

==== 2013 ====
- First officially sponsored LGBT sensitization event at IIT-Madras.
- Chennai Rainbow Film Festival organized by Chennai Dost and Alliance Francaise.
- LGBTQ helpline launched by Srishti Madurai begins 24-hour service with tagline "Just having someone understanding to talk to can save a life".
- Chennai International Queer Film Festival is organized by a collective of groups - Orinam, Goethe-Institut, RIOV, Nirangal, SAATHII, East-West Center for Counselling, Shakthi Resource Centre, and Oye!Chennai.
- The American College in Madurai undergraduate English department includes Funny Boy by Shyam Selvadurai as part of syllabus under gay literature and The Truth about me: A Hijra Life story by A. Revathi under Third Gender literature marginalized studies.
- Nirangal registered as an NGO (formerly Sangama Chennai).
- The Supreme Court of India rules that constitutional law relating to a ban on gay sex should be required to be subject to a constitutional reform procedures unless superseded by higher law, and restores the colonial era law banning gay sex.
- Orinam launches 377archives.

==== 2014 ====
- First book on genderqueer in Tamil and first Tamil book on LGBTQIA from Srishti Madurai released by BJP's state general secretary Vanathi Srinivasan at the Hindu spiritual service foundation's sixth service fair, Chennai.
- Orinam launches 377letters, an online archive of letters to the Chief Justice of India opposing the Supreme Court verdict.
- First homophobic rally in Chennai by Christians Against Homosexuality collective.
- Christians Against Homophobia started in response to the Christians Against Homosexuality collective. Mailing list goes national.
- Madras High Court ruling on 17 April in Jackuline Mary vs. The Superintendent of Police, Karur cites NALSA to grant recognition to a police constable's right to self-identify as a woman and condemns physical/medical testing.
- Tamil Nadu Rainbow Coalition formed.
- Nir, a queer feminist collective, formed.
- Vannam, IIT Madras queer collective formed.
- A month long celebration commences in October to celebrate LGBT History Month at The American College in Madurai with a lecture on gender and sexual minorities organised by Srishti Madurai.

==== 2015 ====
- Tamil movie "I" by Shankar released with transphobic depictions leading to community protests throughout state.
- Thirunangai (trans woman) Bhavana sexually assaulted by Pulianthope police after detention for an alleged crime.
- Chennai Rainbow Film Festival 2015 is organized by Chennai Dost on June 26–28.
- Jawaharlal Nehru University, New Delhi, starts offering "Others" option in the gender column of the application form due to the efforts of Gopi Shankar Madurai of Srishti Madurai and the student community at JNU.
- Srishti Madurai urges Lok Sabha MP's to include intersex people in a bill to protect the rights of trans people.
- Tamil Nadu LGBTIQ community organizes online campaign for HIV Awareness.

==== 2016 ====
- Activist Gopi Shankar Madurai makes a bid to contest as one of the youngest candidates in the Tamil Nadu Assembly election and also the first openly Intersex and Genderqueer person to do so. He secured 14th place out of 21 candidates by securing 1% vote.
- Madras High Court questions the Centre on abysmal state of LGBT rights in India.
- Community gathering, candlelight vigil, and press meet leading up to Supreme Court decision on Curative Petition on 31 January.
- Srishti Madurai's new website is launched by Dalit activist and Ambedkarite Ma. Venkatesan from BJP in the presence of Central Minister Pon Radhakrishnan, Vanathi Srinivasan, Aravindan Neelakandan, Joe D'Cruz, and Rashtriya Swayamsevak Sangh volunteers at Chennai.
- Community gathering and press meet for trans inclusion in political parties campaigning in state elections.
- Queer and Allies Art Festival (QAAF) performances in Chennai, organized by MIST.
- LGBT activists hold candlelight vigil in Chennai for Orlando victims.
- Panel discussion exploring the intersections between violence against women and violence targeting LGBTIQA+ communities at the fourth edition of Reel Desires, Chennai International Queer Film Festival 2016.
- Srishti Madurai, along with Tamil Nadu Theological Seminary in Madurai, a conglomerate of the Church of South India, and the Lutheran Church organize an introductory seminar for church pastors on LGBT issues.
- Gopi Shankar Madurai of Srishti Madurai shortlisted for The Commonwealth Youth Worker Award as regional finalist for Asia.

==== 2017 ====
- LGBT Workplace: Expanding the Dialogue in India, an event that brought together employers, employees, and activists to address challenges faced by the LGBTQ community.
- The Gabrielle Show – Chennai's first drag show.
- Community gathering and discussion on online safety and harassment held as part of Chennai Rainbow Pride month.
- First-of-its-kind Tamil Lesbian Anthem as part of a documentary titled, Ladies And Gentle Women.
- The Supreme Court of Sri Lanka proclaims that it would be inappropriate to impose custodial sentences in a situation where two parties have consensual sex even when criminalized by law.

==== 2019 ====
- The Madras High Court (Madurai Bench) passes a landmark judgment upholding the marriage rights of transgender and intersex women under Hindu Marriage Law and issues direction to ban sex-selective surgeries on intersex infants based on the works of Gopi Shankar. The Court took note of the rampant practice of compulsory sex reassignment surgeries performed on intersex infants and children. The court expressed its gratitude to Shankar, noting that his work has been a "humbling and enlightening experience for the Court."
