= Tamil LGBTQ people =

Tamil people who do not conform to heterosexual gender norms

Tamil LGBTQ people are Tamil people who do not conform to heterosexual gender norms. They may identify as LGBTQIA. It has been estimated that India has a population of 2.5 million homosexuals, though not all of them are Tamil, and not all Tamils live in India.

There are currently laws that criminalize homosexual sex implemented in Malaysia, Sri Lanka, and Mauritius, all of which have Tamil as an official or recognized language, and have referenced Section 377 of the British penal code as far back as colonial times. Sri Lanka and Mauritius have implemented anti-discrimination laws, whereas Sri Lanka and Tamil Nadu provide support to transgender people. The law in Sri Lanka is legally dormant.

The entire political spectrum of Tamil Nadu supports transgender and third gender people. A Buddhist movement and the INC both openly support reforming the colonial law criminalizing gay sex, but the remaining parties have been silent on the issue. Nevertheless, a number of politicians from across the spectrum have taken part in events to support the welfare of the LGBTQ+ community.

== History ==
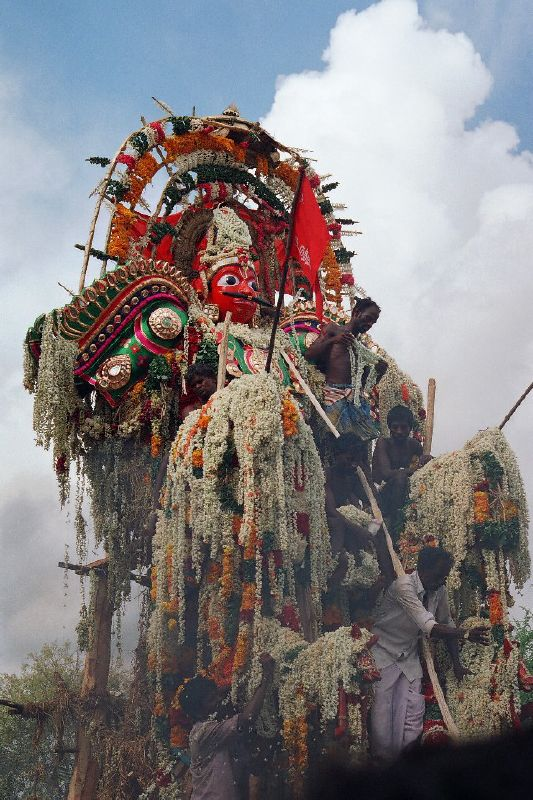
Kuvagam Kuttantavar

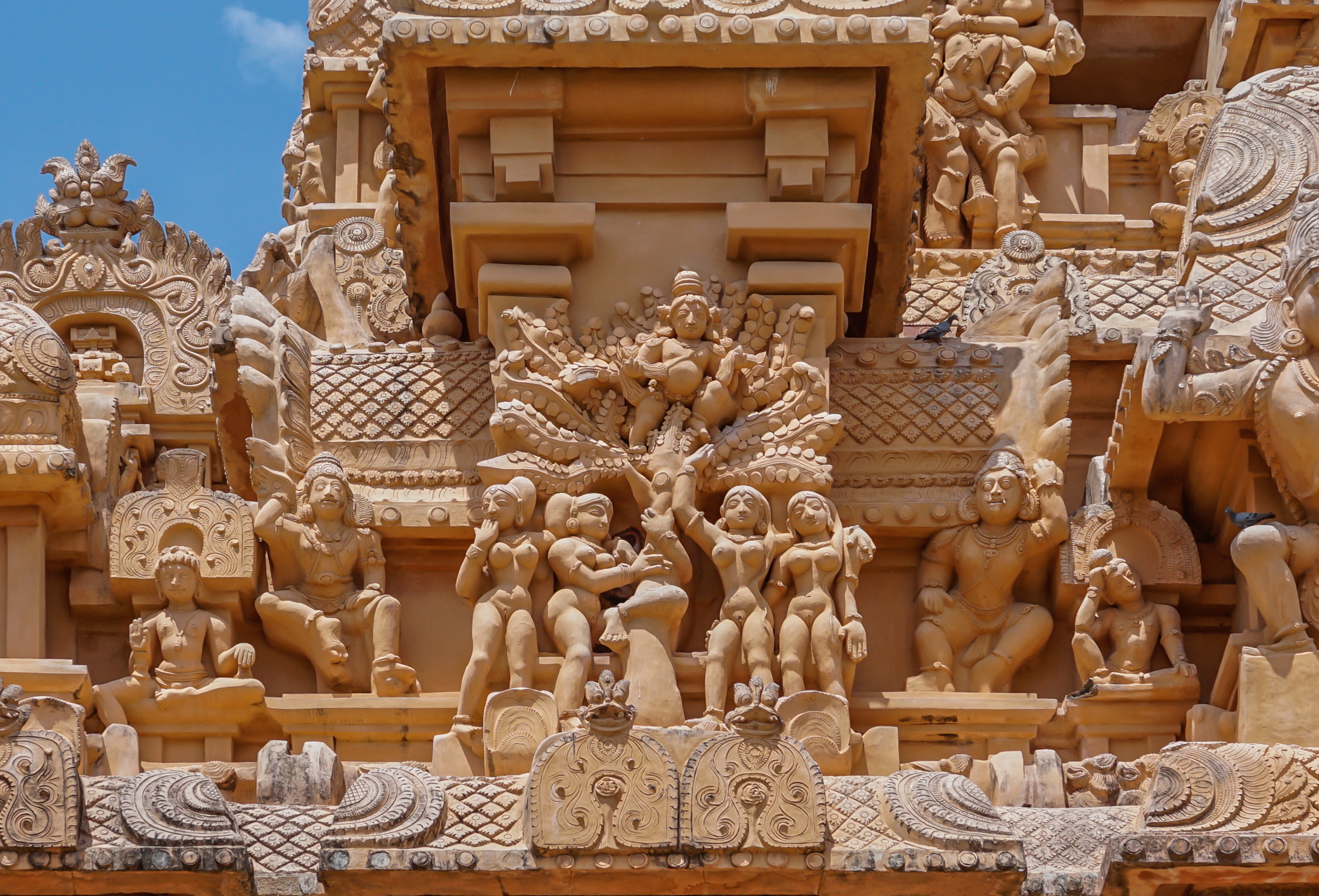
A depiction of sex (kama) at the Chola Era temple at Tanjore

=== Pre-colonial ===
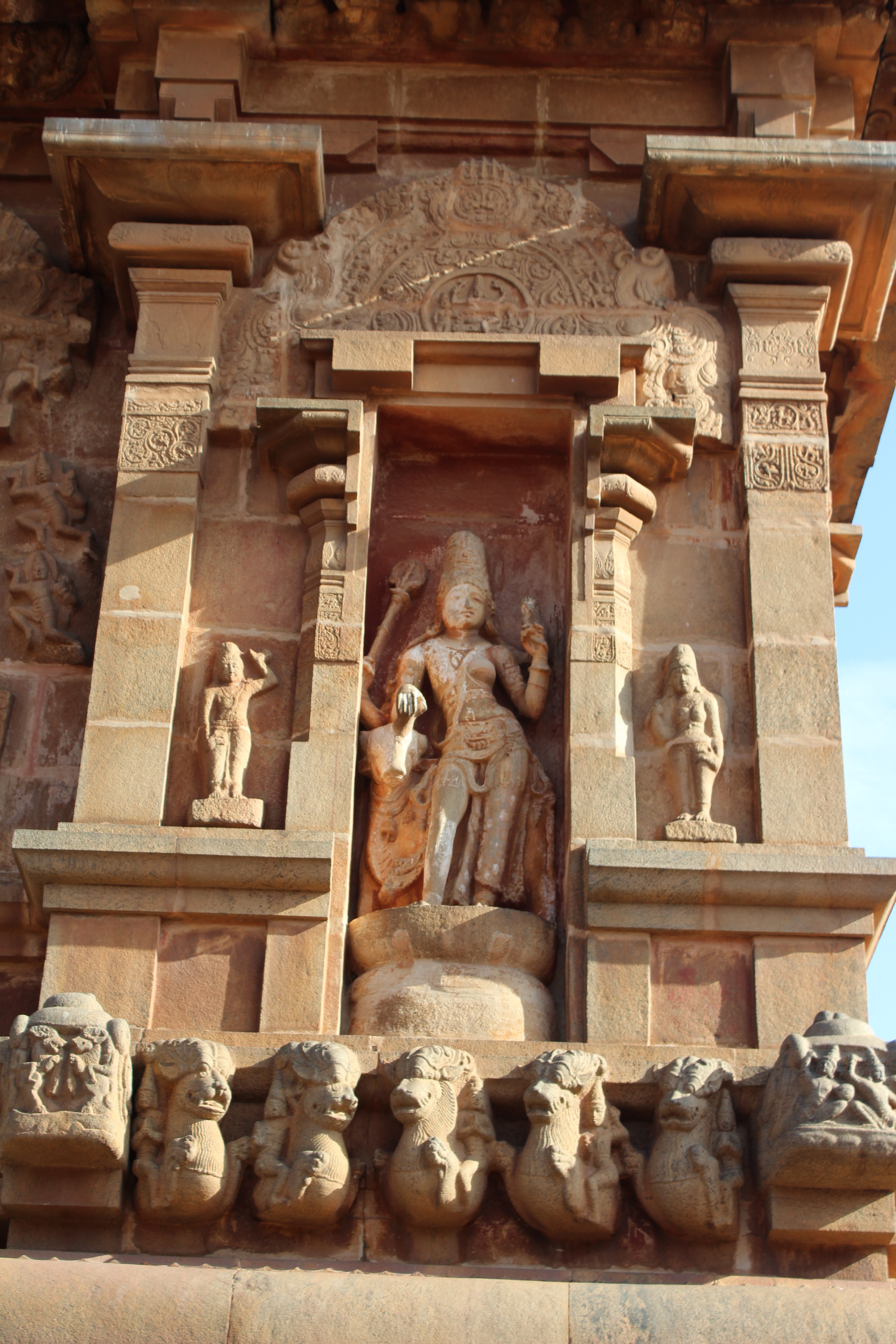
A depiction of Ardhanarishvara, a personification of transgender and third gender people, at Chola Era's Brihadeeswarar Temple.

A festival for the deity Aravan, worshiped by transgender and third gender people, descends from folklore established prior to the advent of the Tamil-Brahmi script and is celebrated at Kuvagam. The story behind the festival is often heard in modern times through the Hindu epic Mahabharata, but more commonly as a separate folklore in Tamil culture.

Several religious statues created during this period, such as at Ranganathaswamy Temple, Srirangam, some of which depict explicit homosexual acts, are attributed to the Chola era. The temple at Brihadisvara also has examples of religious references to transgender people and third genders through depictions of Ardhanarishvarar, a half-male, half-female deity.

Buddhism has no significant history of condemnation of homosexual acts. The Manimekalai, a literary work written by Buddhist poet Satthanar, tells the story of how Buddha would show compassion to people of a city, and includes a man cross-dressing and a Jain monk as main characters.

A number of artwork and records exist that can attest to the freedoms enjoyed by homosexuals prior to colonialism, including religious statues such as at Tanjore.

Homosexuals are catered for in the Kama Sutra and other Hindu medical books. The Kama Sutra was written around the 2nd century AD by Vātsyāyana, and it says that homosexual sex "is to be engaged in and enjoyed for its own sake as one of the arts" and devotes a chapter to describing the acts of homosexual and third gender sex.

=== European colonialism (1500+ CE) ===
==== British Empire and British East India Company ====
"As modernity, nationalism, and colonial and bourgeois morality began to sweep definitively across India in the nineteenth and early twentieth centuries, performing arts changed radically"

— Anna Morcom

It was during this era of British colonial rule that Section 377 of the Indian Penal Code was implemented by the British Raj. Ruth Vanita defines the nineteenth century as ‘a crucial period of transition when a minor strand of pre-colonial homophobia became the dominant voice in colonial and post-colonial mainstream discourses’, and the CERA explains that the set of laws were part of colonial efforts to impose its values on its colony.

Indigenous customs suffered during this era. Ethnomusicologist Anna Morcom points out how 'modernity, nationalism, and colonial and bourgeois morality' supplanting existing performing arts throughout the 18th and 19th centuries, clashing with existing norms such as such as erotic dancing and gender fluidity.

==== Estado da Índia ====
Portuguese India had territorial control over only certain parts of modern-day India's western coast and the island of Lanka, with the remaining being settlements in Southern India (including Tamil Nadu), with these settlements and the island of Lanka being captured (or transferred) to the British later on.

Upon arrival to the island of Sri Lanka, the Portuguese invaders painted the local population as "backwards" and "sinful", explaining that the "horror" of homosexuality was present on the island, characterizing the island's king as being frightening for allowing the act of sodomy on the island, and even accounting that the king himself partook in gay sex.

==== Établissements français dans l'Inde ====
French establishments in Tamil Nadu included Pondichéry, Karikal and Yanaon on the Coromandel Coast. The act of homosexual sex was decriminalized in France during the late 18th century as part of the Napoleonic Code's view on the privacy of people and state intervention, which applied in the French colonies of India at the time.

=== Recent history ===
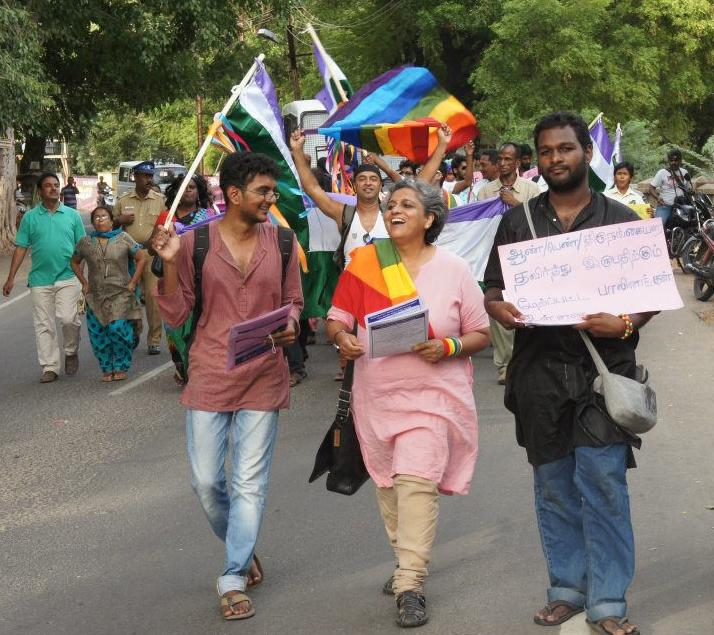
Anjali Gopalan and Gopi Shankar Madurai at Asia's first genderqueer pride parade at Madurai

Chennai-born Anjali Gopalan, whose father was a Tamil Hindu and mother was a Sikh, was one of South Asia's pioneers in providing support for sexual minorities. She established the Naz Foundation in the early 1990s in order to help sufferers deal with HIV, and also to act as a vehicle to lobby for sexual minorities. The organization would later go on to become a major force in Indian politics, persuading the Supreme Court of India to decriminalize gay sex.

Transgender people had long been afforded acceptance in Tamil Nadu, and by 2008 both transgender people and third genders had been recognized by the state. The majority of dominant political parties in Tamil Nadu have contested elections with transgender politicians.

The Tamil Nadu High Court has complained to the Centre that sexual minorities are not being provided their basic rights, suggesting that the law criminalizing gay sex should be reformed and that sexual minorities should be a reserved group. There have also been several politicians from the Tamil BJP and RSS attending and supporting the welfare of sexual minorities.

=== Key events ===
- 1862: the current colonial law criminalizing homosexual sex is implemented by Lord Thomas Macaulay through the Indian Penal Code in British India and the Straits Settlements.
- 1990: Tamil Nadu government forcibly tested several hundred sex workers and then locked up 800 infected women for several months.
- 2008: a transgender welfare board is established by the Government of Tamil Nadu.
- 2009: a gay wedding is held in South Africa according to Hindu rites.
- 2009: the High Court of Delhi removed the colonial-era law banning homosexuality
- 2009: the Hindu Council of Britain announced that Hinduism did not condemn homosexuality.
- 2013: the Supreme Court of India rules that constitutional law relating to a ban on gay sex should be required to be subject to a constitutional reform procedures unless superseded by higher law, and restores the colonial era law banned gay sex.
- Gopi Shankar Madurai, a 25 years old gender activist made a bid to contest as one of the youngest candidates in the Tamil Nadu Assembly election and also the first openly intersex and genderqueer person to do so. Ze secured 14th place out of 21 candidates by securing 1% vote.
- A Hindu gay wedding in Bali, Indonesia, is investigated by Indonesian police.
- 2017 Autumn: The Supreme Court of Sri Lanka proclaims that it would be inappropriate to impose custodial sentences in a situation where two parties have consensual sex even went criminalized by law.
- 2018: The Supreme Court of India proclaims that Section 377A should not cover homosexual sex between two consenting adults.
- 2019: On 22 April 2019 the Madras High Court (Madurai Bench) passed a landmark judgment upholding the marriage rights of trans women & intersex women under Hindu Marriage Law and issued direction to ban sex-selective surgeries on intersex infants.

note: bold typeface indicates that the event is widely considered to be most significant and landmark.

== Etymology ==
In his presence, not only the sun, but also the stars lose their luster

He is all male, female and ali and also different from all these.

— The great Saivite saint Manickavachagar of the 9th century CE in his Thiruvembavai wrote in praise of Lord Annamalai

The terms ali and pedu are widely used in the Tamil language. The term ali refers to third-gender people, whereas the term pedu refers to homosexuals. Kothi (see also: Kothi (gender)) refers to 'effeminate/transgender homosexuals' and is similar to the more famous term kathoey used in Thailand.

According to Ottilingam Somasundaram, in pre-colonial Tamil culture, "The male pedus were described to have many effeminate features such as gait, other bodily movements, high-pitched voice, prudery, lacking virility, beauty and fine feelings. The female pedus were said to have prominent secondary sexual characters of females along with marked hirsutism, with the features of completely feminine stride, pestering, murmuring music, being fed-up, blessing, or cursing."

The term aravaani is also used widely as a catch-all term for sexual minorities, but it can also include those which would be labelled as leaning towards disabled in western lexicon. The term is officially used to describe the community of transgender and third gender people.

== Table of rights ==
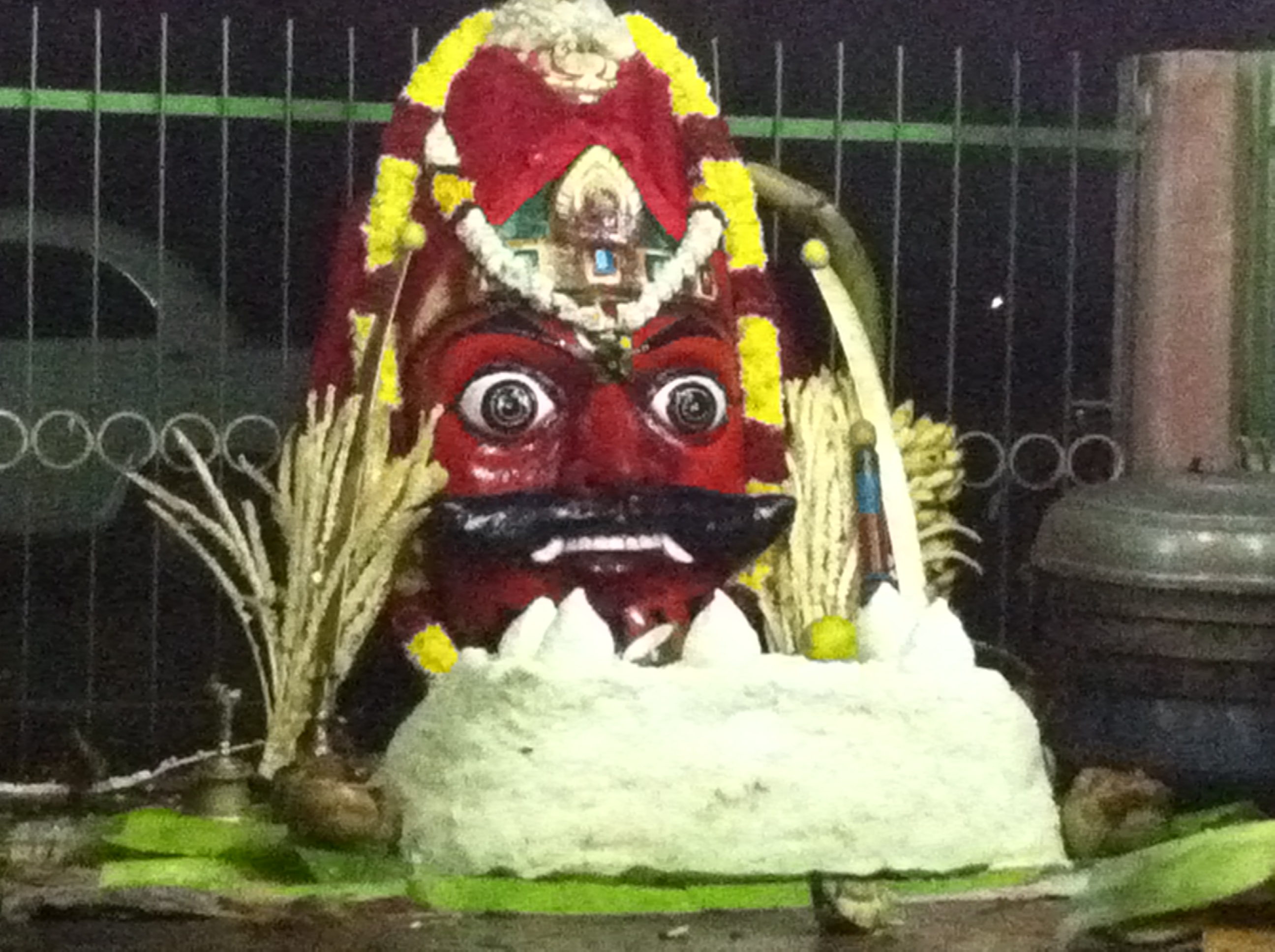
Sri Aravan is a Tamil deity revered by sexual minorities

| Country | Tamil Nadu | Malaysia | Sri Lanka | Singapore | Canada | UK | South Africa |
|---|---|---|---|---|---|---|---|
| Number of Tamils | 55,000,000 | 1,800,000 | 2,270,924 | 250,000 | 300,000 | 300,000 | 200,000 |
| Sex | check | X mark | Nota bene | X mark | check | check | check |
| Anti-Discrimination Laws | check | X mark | check | X mark | check | check | check |
| Transsexuals | check | X mark | check | check | check | check | check |
| Military Service | check | X mark | X mark | check | check | check | check |
| Third Gender | check | X mark | X mark | check | X mark | X mark | X mark |
| Blood Donations | check | X mark | X mark | X mark | check | check | check |

The High Court of Madras has proclaimed that sexual minorities are not being protected as required by the constitution - something that signals its displeasure at the laws discriminating against homosexuals in Tamil Nadu, whereas the Government of Sri Lanka is looking at allowing homosexuals to serve in the military and donate blood.

=== Transgender rights in Tamil Nadu ===
There are an estimated 30,000 transgender people in Tamil Nadu. Aravaani were historically discriminated against in employment in Indian culture, forcing them into begging or prostitution.

The government has been implementing reforms to legal and governmental institutions in order to integrate and support this transgender population, including providing legal rights and welfare schemes. It has been accompanied by a large increase in presence for transsexual and third gender people in the highly self-sufficient Tamil media industry. It is regarded as the leader of transgender welfare in Tamil Nadu.

Aravaani can access sex reassignment surgery (SRS), accommodation, various identity documents, education, social security, and support for job/income seeking, and the state was also the first in India to introduce a Welfare Board with participants from the transgender community.

=== Recent developments in Sri Lanka ===
In November 2017, General Nerin Pulle, the Deputy Solicitor of Sri Lanka, has stated that the government 'remains committed to law reform and guaranteeing non-discrimination on the grounds of sexual orientation and gender identity', and that the government has vowed to repel the colonial era law criminalizing homosexual sex during its periodic review of governmental affairs.

The Supreme Court of Sri Lanka has stated that consensual sex between adults should not be policed by the state and that "imposing custodial sentences would be inappropriate in cases where the impugned acts were between consenting adults" even when mandated by the law, thereby legally setting the law dormant.

=== Supreme Court of India's verdict on Section 377 ===
After making homosexuality illegal in 2013, the Supreme Court proclaimed by a 5-0 unanimous verdict homosexual sex between consenting adults should not be covered under Section 377. It said that the law violated the LGBT community's right to equality, dignity and privacy, under the Constitution of India.

== Politics ==
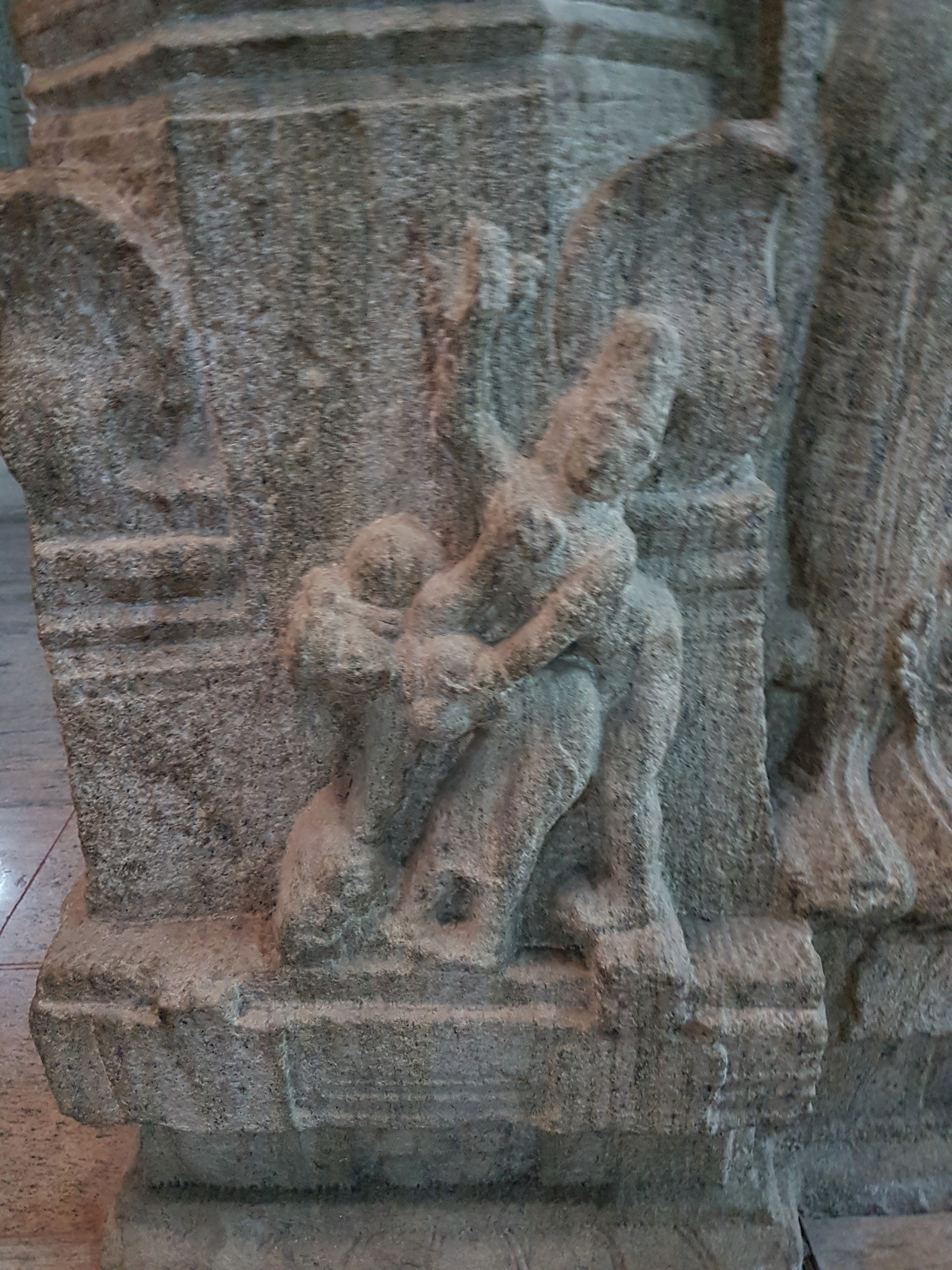
An erotic carving in the Meenakshi Temple in Madurai

Tamil Nadu is one of the few states in India where activists have been seeking to attack anti-homosexuality laws at a state level. This is due to the nationalist climate of Tamil Nadu, the State's history of supporting reformation in favor of sexual minorities, and its diverging interpretation of the Hindu Marriage Act. But movement has yet to have been made in Tamil Nadu as of yet.

=== Major parties ===
The AIADMK and DMK have both held back from openly speaking out in favor of reforming colonial laws criminalizing homosexual sex, but several politicians from both parties have attended meetings and events in support of homosexuals, and neither party has formally voiced support for the law in the manner that many federal parties have.

The two parties have also successfully contested transsexual people at elections, and have appointed transsexual people to higher levels of their political parties and to government.

==== Right-wing ====
===== BJP (India) =====
In July 2018 the BJP government announced on that it will no longer oppose the decriminalization of homosexuality and leave it up to the courts to deliberate on.

The parent organization of BJP Rashtriya Swayamsevak Sangh and its head Mohan Bhagwat stated LGBTQ people were part of society.

===== UNP (Sri Lanka) =====
It is widely held that the homosexuality of the party's leader is an open secret. Ranil Wickremesinghe was the victim of accusations that he abused his power to seduce younger party members into having homosexual sex with him, which they allege is driving parents to keep their children away from the party's promotional activities. This might reflect the ethos of the party and its voter base as a whole.

Mangala Samaraweera is an openly gay politician serving as the country's Ministry of External Affairs on behalf of the UNP.

Being gay is totally fine. Even in Sri Lanka, you can be gay, as long as you marry a woman. I think this is horrible (girls I know have married gay guys in arranged marriages and it was predictably terrible and short-lived). What I mean is that being homosexual is fine even if it's not accepted by some cultures. Sexual harassment and assault is not fine in any abstraction.

— Indi Samarajiva, Colombo Telegraph

==== Left-wing ====
===== INC (India) =====
The INC had vocally opposed the repeal of Section 377 whilst it was in power in the late 2000s and early 2010s.

===== UPFA (Sri Lanka) =====
The party had used prejudiced slurs in parliament against the UNP whilst openly gay Mangala Samaraweera was speaking.

=== Minor parties ===
The Buddhist movement (known in India as the Ambedkar Movement) has formally supported the reformation of colonial laws as part of its humanistic approach to governance. The BJP has formally voices support for the colonial law, but their Tamil office has members who attended various pro-LGBT events in Chennai, whereas the INC has said it wants to decriminalize homosexual sex.

Though these political parties have minor presence in Tamil political culture, support for reformation also came from the Communist Party of India (Marxist), the Janata Dal (S) and the Aam Aadmi Party. The Chief Minister of neighboring state of Kerala, Pinarayi Vijayan of the Communist Party, has actively voiced support for decriminalizing gay sex.

== Welfare ==
The Government of Tamil Nadu funds a transgender welfare board which supports the transgender community with health related issues and other social problems, and it has scheduled the community as a reserved group which is entitled to receive special benefits.

The Aravani Welfare Board is a social support organizations that's headquartered in the outskirts of Chennai, focusing on supporting the transgender community of Tamil Nadu. It plays an influential role in the organizations behind the Koovagam Festival. The name Aravani is a namesake of Krishna.

One of Tamil Nadu's most senior BJP politicians, Pon Radhakrishnan, launched a website for sexual minorities called Shrishti, with the aid of several volunteers from RSS.

=== Dating preferences ===
An informal survey found that the majority of sexual minorities in Sri Lanka found westerners sexually desirable, finding them more 'sensual and sexually adept' than the locals; only around a quarter had had sex with a westerner. None of those surveys had issues with dating someone from the opposite ethnolinguistic group, either Tamil or Sinhalese, But apart from one person, the majority expressed dislike for Muslims (including Moors) and did not like them as friends or sexual partners.

There is a preference for youth among the community, though social respect for the elderly can mean older people are also able to find sex.

A survey found that the locals considered their own ethnicities "to be the most beautiful men in the world" placing them above westerners, the latter who were viewed as more 'sensual and sexually adept' than the locals.

=== Chennai ===
Community development may be traced back to Sunil Menon's mapping of sexual networks among MSM and TG in the early 1990s and subsequent formation of Sahodaran, the oldest group of its kind in the city and state to provide spaces for community support and sexual health, primarily for working-class MSM who visit public cruising spots.

There are currently over 15 groups in Chennai that work on LGBTQIA+ issues. Most of them are community-run initiatives, and some are NGOs.

Most of these groups are part of the informal Chennai Rainbow Coalition, formed in 2009, to jointly work towards visibility and advocacy. The group was expanded in 2014 to constitute the Tamil Nadu Rainbow Coalition, with membership from groups around the state.

Other progressive groups such as Nirmukta (Chennai Free Thinkers), Prajnya, the Save Tamils movement, and the Tamil Nadu Progressive Writers Association (subscription required)are also strong supporters of gender/sexuality rights.

==== Research ====
Chennai has two research institutes that partner with community groups to conduct social science and biomedical research on LGBTQIA+ issues. The Centre for Sexuality and Health Research and Policy has published extensively on issues such as stigma and discrimination faced within the healthcare system by MSM and trans women, legal recognition of transgender identity, and other issues. The National Institute for Research on Tuberculosis (NIRT), in partnership with the community group Sahodaran and Harvard University School of Public Health carries out studies of mental health and HIV prevention among men who have sex with men.

==== Workplace symposium ====
In May 2017, Chennai saw an event that brought together employers, employees and activists to discuss the challenges faced by the queer (LGBTIQ) community at workplaces. This LGBT workplace symposium, titled LGBT Workplace — Expanding the Dialogue in India, was hosted by RELX in association with the Amsterdam-based Workplace Pride Foundation and the Bengaluru-based Solidarity Foundation, with Orinam and Community Business as community partners.

Some of the panellists were Michiel Kolman, a senior vice president at Elsevier, Parmesh Shahani, head of Godrej India Culture Labs, Sunil Menon, founder of NGO Sahodaran, lawyer Poongkhulali Balasubramanian, Mahesh Natarajan, form InnerSight, Ritesh Rajani, an openly gay HR diversity professional, and journalist Lavanya Narayan.

=== Charitable organizations ===
- Srishti Madurai
- Orinam
- NAZ Foundation

== Culture ==
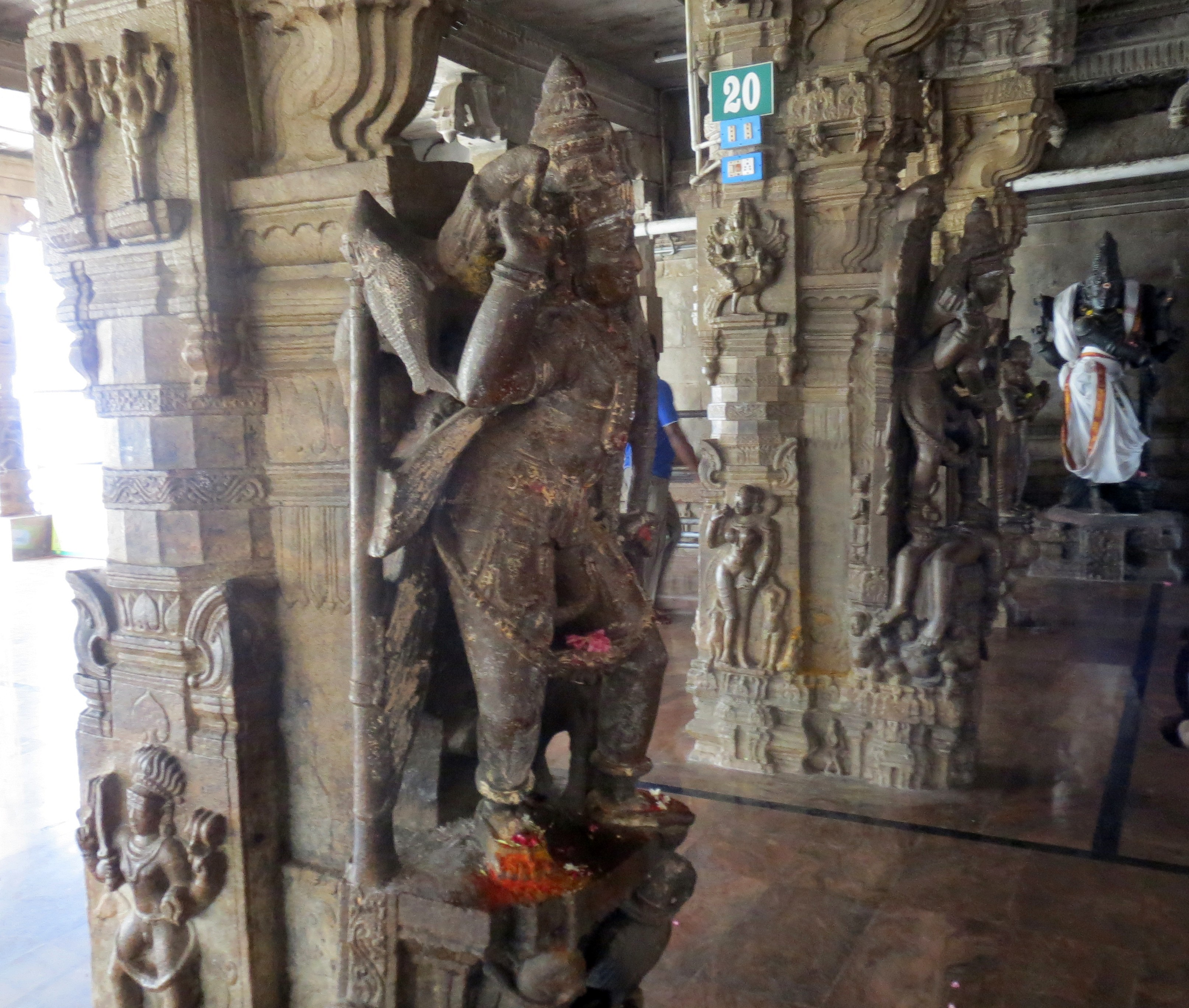
A Chola era statue of Ardhanareshwarar - the personification of transgender people

A major problem with discrimination, namely racism and colorism, against South Indians remains commonplace throughout the Tamil world, with issues of casteism also playing a role in India. Tamils discriminate against those from Islamic backgrounds.

=== Musicals ===
Kollywood is based on traditional entertainment in Hindu temples, where dances would perform a ballet to a story accompanied by musical instruments and singers. There has been very few musicals produced in Tamil Nadu containing sexual minorities, though a few about transsexual people have been produced.

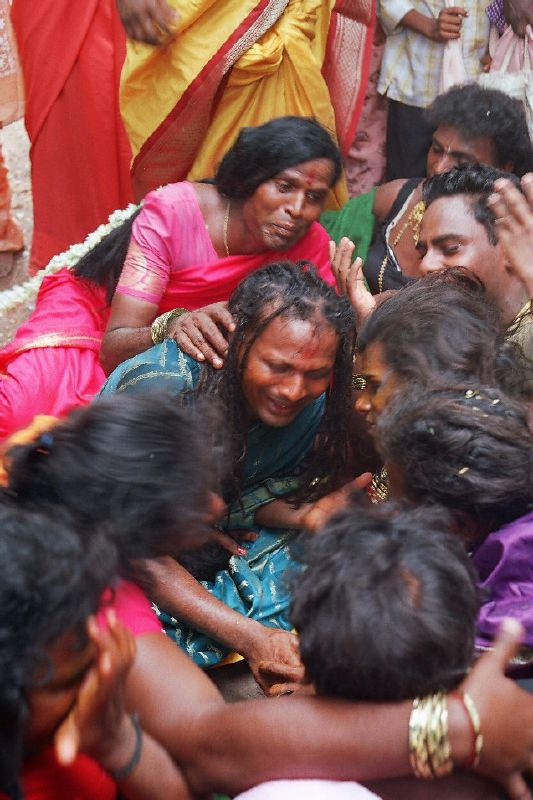
A religious ceremony being performed by hijras in the City of Kuvagam

The classical dance form Bharatanatyam is frequently considered to be a venue where non-heterosexual sexual minorities are able to express themselves strongly as the dance utilizes gender-fluid concepts, and the dancers of the Bharatanatyam are predominantly women, gay men, and transgender people.

==== Partial list of musicals with sexual minorities ====
- i by Shankar depicts a transgender stylist who is in love with the protagonist, although many members of the transgender community felt that the role was comical.
- Goa by Venkat Prabhu is a 2010 movie about a group of friends who take a holiday to Goa where they befriend a gay couple.
- Appu (2000) is about third genders.
- Vettaiyaadu Vilayaadu (2006) has a narrative about a killer molesting/raping men, though the depiction is considered to be negative by many due to the link between homosexuality and psychopathy.
- Murattu Kaalai is a movie with a narrative dealing with social issues affecting the transsexual community.
- Bombay (1995) by Mani Ratnam is about a transgender person who nurses two children while the city around them riots.
- Vaanam (2011) Radhakrishna Jagarlamudi is a story told from the viewpoint of a transgender sex worker.
- Kanchana (2011) is a horror movie in which Sarathkumar plays the role of a transgender person.

=== Literature ===
One of Tamil's most famous literary works involving sexual minorities was composed around 600 BCE. The ancient folklore about Aravan tells the story about Krishna's transformation to a female manifestation in order to marry the deity Aravan, all of which takes place during the context of the Mahābhārata.

The following Sangam period also gave birth to many famous literature works about sexual minorities, a famous story is the one about the deep love and attachment between the King Pari and poet Kabila. Other works such as the one between Koperunchozhan and Pisuranthaiyar also exist though are less famous.

Manimekalai was composed during the closing centuries of the Sangam period (or after depending on the definition used) by the Tamil Buddhist poet Sathanar, which tells the tale of how Buddha gave compassion to various people of a city, including a monk, a drunk man, and a cross-dressing boy.

=== Festivals ===
The most famous festival involving sexual minorities is the Koovagam Festival in the Tamil city of Villupuram based on the folklore of Aravani. The celebration is dedicated to the deity Aravani, the groom (and later husband) of the transgender manifestation of Sri Krishna. The festival involves religious rituals, blessings, parades, re-enactments of scenes from the folklore, political protests, and sexual intercourse under the full moon, among other things. It is frequented by many non-transgender sexual minorities and has become a staple of Tamil culture, not only for the sexual minority community, but also to the wider general population of Tamil Nadu.

An annual LGBT Film Festival is also held at the Gothe Institute in Chennai, an institution of the German Federal Government, organized by Alliance-Francaise, an institution of the French Republic Government, and SAATHII. This has frequently been joined by one-off movie events organized by other foreign institutions and NGOs.

Other events include the Chennai Rainbow Pride.

== Discrimination ==
A number of transgender people have taken offense at what they perceive to be comical and/or negative depictions of their community, with the depictions often stereotyping the community as being promiscuous.

=== Public health ===
HIV remains a serious problem in Tamil Nadu and Sri Lanka. As the majority of transmissions of HIV in India are through heterosexual sex, the majority of support networks have focused on declining transmission rates among heterosexuals, and while this has worked in reducing transmission rates among heterosexuals, transmission rates among homosexuals have been increasing. The LGBTQIA remains the only high-risk HIV group in India.

The YR Gaitonde Centre for AIDS Research and Education (YRGCARE) conducted rapid study of homosexuals in Tamil Nadu around 2008 across 18 cities, towns, and villages. The study found that prevalence of HIV among homosexual sexual minorities in major urban areas stood at around 10%, and was compounded by a lack of education.

=== Colorism and racism ===
Sri Lankans resemble (and are part of the stock of) South Indians in terms of body build, face shapes and anthropology; most islanders have a brown skin tone, and often light skinned people are considered to be foreign by the islanders.

Indian cinema industries are viewed as being discriminatory against browner skin tones, but the island's cinemas are dominated by island-produced movies, and South Asian cinemas are disliked by younger people.

A survey found that the locals considered their own ethnicities "to be the most beautiful men in the world" placing them above westerners, the latter who were viewed as more 'sensual and sexually adept' than the locals.

== Personalities ==
Rose Venkatesan hosts a talk show called Ippadikku Rose and has also hosted beauty contests in Tamil Nadu.

Swapna.S is the first trans woman to clear the state civil services exam. One of the key figures in the modern Trans educational rights movement in India.

Grace Banu is a transgender activist who was the transgender person to be admitted to an engineering college in India. She has also been working against what she perceives as discrimination against lower castes too.

Gopi Shankar Madurai is a human rights activist, first openly Intersex and Genderqueer candidate to contest in Tamil Nadu State Assembly Election 2016. A monk during their youth, He quit in order to become more politically active and has become a leader in Tamil activism. Shankar is a practitioner and teacher of traditional philosophies.

Living Smile Vidya is a transgender actor whose biography "I am Vidya" has been made into a movie in the neighboring state of Karnataka.

Shyam Selvadurai is a gay fiction author who lives in Canada. He is of Sri Lankan Tamil origin.

Bharathi Kannamma is a transgender lawmaker who tried to represent an electoral district in Madurai at the Parliament of India.

note: several personalities listed in this section are mixed-ethnicity, but are included because they either speak Tamil or reside in a Tamil area.

== See also ==
- LGBT rights in India
- LGBT rights in Sri Lanka
- LGBTQ people in Sri Lanka
