= Chennai International Queer Film Festival =

LGBTQ film festival in India

Reel Desires: Chennai International Queer Film Festival
- Location: Chennai, India
- Language: International
- Website: www.ciqff.org

Chennai International Queer Film Festival (also known as Reel Desires: Chennai International Queer Film Festival) is a three-day LGBT event that usually takes places on the last weekend of July as a part of the city's pride events. The main organizers are SAATHII and Orinam in partnership with Goethe-Institut, Chennai. The other volunteers include various community groups and NGOs, including Nirangal, East-West Center for Counselling, and RIOV. The last day is usually performances along with a panel discussion, usually to discuss and bring out the challenges faced by community members.

== Background ==
This LGBT-film festival is being held from 2005 in the city. The shorts, documentary and feature film submitted usually explore the intersections among sexuality/gender identity and other forms of marginalization, also including those based on gender, disability, immigrant/refugee status, caste, socio-economic class, religion, age, and race/ethnicity.

== 2023 ==
In its 11th edition, Orinam, an LGBTQIA+ support community, in collaboration with the Goethe-Institut, Chennai, continues its tradition of challenging heteronormative norms. The festival, scheduled to take place from August 18 to 20 at the Goethe-Institut, will feature a lineup of 30 films—10 from the subcontinent and the rest from 11 countries around the world.

This year's selection includes a mix of shorts, documentaries, and feature-length films such as Impasse, Binary Error, All Men Should Have Shoes, Oas (Dewdrops), Pussy Cruising, Transcending Boundaries, and Neubau.

In addition to the films, the festival will feature a play titled Neela Bhoomi, directed by Tamilarasi R, which explores the life of a lesbian couple as they navigate the challenges of building a home together. Other highlights include a performance by Chennai-based drag artist Nethu Night Neelambari and a hip hop night.

A panel discussion titled "Queer Families: Beyond the Marriage Equality Debate" will also be held, addressing the concept of family beyond traditional definitions upheld by law, culture, religion, media, and advertisements. According to the organizers, "The panel discussion assumes relevance in light of the awaited Supreme Court verdict on marriage equality."

== 2020 ==
The eighth edition of Reel Desires: Chennai International Queer Film Festival was held online over two weekends, December 5–6 and 12–13, 2020. This year's festival showcased 25 films from 12 countries, selected through a community-led review process, and focused on themes of sexuality and gender diversity.

Highlights among the short films included the award-winning After That Party by Lucas Drummond, the poetic Bodies of Desire by Varsha Panikar, and the world premiere of Sab Rab De Bande, a documentary on queer Sikhs by Sukhdeep Singh. The feature-length lineup featured notable films such as Boxed by Sameeksha and Kiss The Moon by Khalid Gill.

== 2019 ==
The 7th edition of Reel Desires: Chennai International Queer Film Festival was held from August 2–4, 2019. This year's line-up consisted of 26 films from 12 countries, selected from nearly 120 submissions via a community-led review process.

The 7th edition of Reel Desires: Chennai International Queer Film Festival was held from August 2–4, 2019, and marked the first festival since the Supreme Court of India's landmark Navtej Singh Johar verdict, which decriminalized same-gender relations. This historic ruling led to a significant increase in submissions from India. The festival showcased 26 films from 12 countries, selected from nearly 120 submissions through a community-led review process.

Highlights of the 2019 festival included shorts from the Berlinale Spotlight (Berlin International Film Festival) and India's Public Service Broadcasting Trust (PSBT). In addition to film screenings, Reel Desires featured performances, a panel discussion, and the Chennai premiere of the multilingual play *Freedom Begum - In Search of Lost Stories* by Raahi, a Bengaluru-based group of sexual and gender minorities. Notable films such as *Miss Man*, a Bengali short by Tathagata Ghosh, *Nján Sánjo* (I'm Sánjo), a Malayalam short by Jijo Kuriakose, and *Oruvanukku Oruththi?* (A woman for a man?), a Tamil short by Vimal Santiagu, were screened, with the respective filmmakers in attendance for discussions post-screening.

== 2018 ==
The Goethe-Institut / Max Mueller Bhavan hosted the Reel Desires: Chennai International Queer Film Festival from July 27–29, 2018.

The sixth edition of the Chennai International Queer Film Festival (CIQFF) featured a diverse lineup of 32 films from 17 countries. The festival primarily showcased works by local indigenous artists and media students, highlighting the challenges faced by grassroots activists and shedding light on realities often overlooked by the general public.

In addition to the international films, the festival also screened eight Tamil and Indian feature films, shorts, and documentaries, including *Cover Story* and *Anthadhi*. The festival opened with a poetry reading by Kalki Subramaniam, and concluded with a biographical theater performance by author and activist A. Revathi, titled *Vellai Mozhi*, directed by A. Mangai.

== 2017 ==
The 12th queer film festival in 2017 saw 27 films, which were chosen from nearly 70 submissions from 12 countries. The event also saw a panel discussion about the activism in the south of India, around LGBTQIA, titled `South of the Norm: LGBTIQA+ activism in southern India'.

=== Movies Screened ===
Some of the movies screened include:

Year	Title	Country	Theme
2017	Siebzehn (Seventeen)	Germany	Lesbian
2017	Abar Jodi Ichchha Karo (If you dare desire)	India	Lesbian
2012	All About Our Famila	India	Hijra
2017	Ladies and Gentlewomen	India	Lesbian
2016	Ka Bodyscapes	India	Gay
2016	Is It Too Much To Ask?	India	Trans woman

== 2016 ==
It is the fourth time the Goethe-Institut is collaborating with the Reel Desires. Of the 80 films received, the organizers chose 26 films from eight countries. Some notable movies were Sridhar Rangayan’s National Award-winning Breaking Free, Chennai-based Sairam Biswas’s It Adhu But Aanaal and also the acclaimed Aligarh. The panel discussion this year was about "Ending Gender and Sexuality-based Violence".

== 2015 ==
Reel Desires: Chennai International Queer Film Festival 2015, will be held from 24 to 26 July at the Goethe-Institut / Max Mueller Bhavan in Chennai. The festival will screen 23 films from eight countries, out of which some of the significant ones are Pride, the 2014 Cannes Film Festival award winner, Walking the Walk by Moses Tulasi, Aakkamum Thaakkamum (portrayals of transgender women in Tamil Cinema) and more.

== 2014 ==
In 2014, the festival also hosted a photography exhibition by Shilpa Raj, a Bengaluru-based photographer, and social activist. Her exhibits were transgender people posing in diverse avatars, charting the transition from male to female in 14 stills. There were also photos that establish references to Ramayana and Mahabharata. Some of the noteworthy movies screened were Kyunki, an Indian Submission, Eyes that do not see, from USA, Kumu Hina, a Hawaiian movie and Not funny from Germany.

== 2013 ==
2013 the organizers received around ninety one films from 22 countries, out of which 35 films including shorts, documentaries, and feature films were screened. These were from India and over 10 countries. The three-day event was from 11 to 13 July 2013 and some movies screened were Gay_Lonely, about a 30-plus gay man, Kuch Palon Mein, Veena Kulkarni's ‘Reminiscene of Ether’, Debalina Majumder’s ‘Ebang Bewarish (And the Unclaimed)’ among others.

== See also ==
- List of LGBT film festivals
- Tamil Sexual Minorities
