= Kolkata Rainbow Pride Walk =

LGBT event in Kolkata, India

- Status: active
- Genre: Pride parade
- Date: 2 July 1999
- Frequency: Yearly
- Venue: Kolkata
- Country: India
- Years active: 1999- present
- Founder: Aparajita Majumdar
- Most recent: 2019
- Major events: LGBTQ rights
- Organiser: Kolkata Rainbow Pride Festival (KRPF)

Kolkata Rainbow Pride Walk (KRPW) is the oldest pride walk in India and South Asia. The first march in Kolkata was organised on 2 July 1999. The walk was called The Friendship Walk. Kolkata was chosen as the first city in India to host the march owing to Kolkata's history of movements for human and Political Rights. Currently, Kolkata Rainbow Pride Walk is organised by the Kolkata Rainbow Pride Festival (KRPF).

Kolkata Rainbow Pride Walk is held with the intention of making a political statement for Equality, Tolerance, Love and Solidarity. The walk is held to strengthen the voice for equality for all – irrespective of gender, sexuality, religion, etc. The participants walk in solidarity with all rights based movements, Child rights, Women's rights, Dalit rights, Rights of the Disabled/differently-abled, students groups, and others.

== History ==
=== 1999 ===
Kolkata's pride march 1999 was the first ever such march in India, organised on 2 July 1999. The walk was called The Friendship Walk. The march began with hardly fifteen participants and some of these participants came from other cities in India, including Mumbai and Bangalore. The participants were wearing specially designed, bright yellow T-shirts with graphics of footsteps and a caption reading "Walk on the Rainbow". Some well-known people who participated in The Friendship Walk included Ashok Row Kavi, Nitin Karani, Pawan Dhall, Owais Khan and Rafique-Ul-Haque-Dowjah-Ranjan. The idea of a pride walk to highlight the issue took birth in the mind of Owais Khan.

The participants of The Friendship Walk split into two different groups after walking a certain distance. One group went towards North Kolkata and the other group went towards South Kolkata. The two teams went to various NGOs, including WB SACS, Human Rights Organisation and other NGOs working for prevention of AIDS and also met a few famous personalities like Maitree Chatterjee, who has been one of the strongest voices behind women movement in Kolkata and put forward their agenda and demands.

By the time the two teams had reached George Bhavan, the final destination of the march, all the major English and regional newspapers and television channels had reached there to cover the event. The participants talked to the media about the reason behind the walk and issues they wanted the government to look at and also handed them the media release and other literature of the march. It was followed by an impromptu walk for the shutterbugs by those participants who were comfortable being photographed. The media coverage of the walk spread far and wide and the participants received a lot of support from within the country as well as from other South Asian countries like Pakistan and Bangladesh.

=== 2003 ===
After 1999, the pride walk in Kolkata hadn't been organised again until June 2003. Rafique-Ul-Haque-Dowjah-Ranjan had rekindled the idea again, which resulted in Kolkata's second pride march. The walk was organised by Integration Society and other groups like Amitie. The second pride walk of Kolkata was attended by around 50 people. The walk had started from Park Circus Maidan and had ended at Jagabandhu Institution.

During the 2013 pride walk, some participants had asked a photojournalist to cover the walk sensitively in the media. The photojournalist had taken offence and ha threatened that he had the power to paint a very negative picture of the march. Because of the altercation, the march was stalled for a few minutes.

=== 2004 ===
The 2004 pride march saw a four-fold increase in the turnout for the walk from the 2003 march. Over 200 people participated in the 2004 walk.

=== 2005 ===
Buoyed by the response received during the 2004 pride march, in 2005 an entire week of celebration was hosted. The events of this week-long celebration involved a 3-day film festival, seminars at American Centre, activities at Infosem, a day of interaction with parents and another day for media briefings. The music video "Pokkhiraaj" (Pegasus), by the Bengali rock band Cactus was also released in the Rainbow week. This video used blue apple to symbolise LGBTQ people and relations. The event culminated in a pride march.

2006

Pride walk was held

2007

Pride walk was held

=== 2008 ===
On 29 June 2008, Kolkata hosted a queer pride parade, which was coordinated with the queer pride parades of three other Indian cities (Delhi, Bangalore and Pondicherry).

=== 2011 ===
The pride march 2011 in Kolkata was organised by the Kolkata Rainbow Pride Festival, a non-profit collective of individuals and organisations. This was the first year that women joined the parade. About 6 women participated in the Pride March.

=== 2012 ===
Kolkata Rainbow Pride Walk 2012 was organised on 15 July. The march started from the Hazra Crossing and the end point of the march was in front of Academy of Fine Arts, Rabindra Sadan. The number of participants in the Kolkata Rainbow Pride Walk 2012 touched 1500 and the number of women participants in the march also increased. This year 25% of the participants in the walk were women.

Kolkata Rainbow Pride Festival (KRPF) also organised an exhibition of paintings, photographs, posters, video art and pamphlets of NGOs working on gender and sexuality rights before the Kolkata Rainbow Pride Walk 2012. The exhibition was titled 'Broadening the Canvas ~ Celebrating Blemishes' and was hosted at ICCR, Ho Chi Minh Sarani, near to US Consulate in Kolkata. The exhibition opened on 9 June and was to end on 14 June. The theme of the exhibition was Gender & Sexuality. The exhibition was curated by a Delhi-based art historian and joint secretary of Performers Independent, Rahul Bhattacharya. The exhibition showcased the works of Balbir Krishan, Anuradha Upadhaya, Deepak Tandon, Jayna Mistry, Jose Abad, Mandakini Devi, Manmeet Devgun, Moumita Shaw, Paribartan Mohanty, Prakash Kishore, Rudra Kishore Mandal, Suchismita Ukil, Syed Taufik Riaz, Tapati Choudhury and Vidisha Saini.

=== 2013 ===
Kolkata Rainbow Pride Walk 2013 was the 12th annual pride march of Kolkata without any interruption since 2003. It was held on 7 July 2013. Like Kolkata Rainbow Pride Walk 2012, the 2013 march also started from the Hazra Crossing and the end point of the march was in front of Academy of Fine Arts, Rabindra Sadan. A fundraising party on 22 June and a workshop at the American Center on 28 June were organised before the pride walk. I am Omar, a short film on a same-sex relationship by Onir, was also screened at the Lincoln room as a part of the workshop where the filmmaker himself was present to support the pride walk. About 500 members of the community chanted slogans during the march. The 12th annual pride march of Kolkata witnessed participation from Indian states like Delhi, Karnataka and Odisha as well as foreign participants from Nepal, African Countries and the United States.

=== 2014 ===
Kolkata experienced its 13th annual queer pride walk on 13 July 2014, which was organised by the team of Kolkata Rainbow Pride Festival (KRPF). The participants had marched from Triangular Park on Rashbehari Avenue to Jodhpur Park. The route was changed a little as the timings of the march clashed with chief minister Mamata Banerjee's visit to an Iftar at Park Circus, which would have been the end point of the march according to the original plan. A fundraiser party before the pride walk was also organised by KRPF on 5 July 2014, to generate revenue for the walk. The walk saw over 1,500 people in attendance. The organisers said the turnout would have been even more if it hadn't rained during the walk.

Kolkata Rainbow Pride Walk 2014 promoted tolerance towards diversity as well as talked about the NALSA (National Legal Services Authority) judgement, which recognizes the legal and constitutional rights of transgender people, the rights of the eunuch community, and the right to gender self-determination.

=== 2015 ===
Kolkata's 14th annual queer pride walk was held on 13 December 2015. The theme of the walk was 'Walking with Love and Solidarity'. Initially, the 14th Kolkata Rainbow Pride Walk was to begin from College Square, converge at the Y Channel and end at Esplanade Metro Channel. However, the route was changed in lieu of President Pranab Mukherjee's visit to the city on the same date as the pride march. The route was changed after a meeting held between senior officers of Lalbazar – Kolkata Police Headquarters and the organisers of the pride walk. The walk then started from Shyambazar and ended at Moulali.

=== 2016 ===
Kolkata Rainbow Pride Walk 2016 was held on 11 December 2016. The march began from Esplanade Y Channel in central Kolkata to Park Circus Maidan. The theme of Kolkata Rainbow Pride Walk 2016 was 'Law and Rights'. The theme was depicted by the participants through their colorful and fascinating costumes. An interactive session was also organised on 2 December 2016, where a film was screened and thoughts and queer writings were shared amongst the participants.

The participants and organizers of the Kolkata Rainbow Pride Walk 2016 demanded the revocation of Section 377 of the Indian Penal Code to exclude consensual same-sex activity from its purview. They said that the Transgender Persons (Protection of Rights) Bill, 2016, should be withdrawn and demanded the introduction of a new bill incorporating the community's input. The organizers also took up the cause to provide justice to Tara, a 28 year old transgender woman who worked with many NGO’s such as Sahodaran. She was found dead in Chennai in skeptical circumstances after being severely burnt. They also demanded a judicial probe into Tara's death.

Ending the Pride walk all shouted: "It is my body and my wish... be gone demons."

=== 2017 ===
Kolkata Rainbow Pride Walk 2017 was held on 10 December 2017 Sunday. The march began from Deshapriya Park and ended at Park Circus Maidan. The march was held on the same day as Transgender Day of Rage and it was preceded by 'protest against the proposed Transgender Persons Bill 2016' which was being debated at the parliament at the time and was considered to be regressive and ineffective by majority of LGBT community. The bill does not provide for the enforcement of the right to ‘self-perceived’ gender identity for a person recognized as a ‘transgender’. The bill also lacks certainty about the recognition of the transgender persons in the application of certain criminal and personal laws that are currently in force. Handouts were also passed around that gave an emphasis on the dangerous nature of the bill. Souvik Som, a founder member of the Kolkata Pride Festival and also one of the organizers of the Kolkata Pride Walk since 2011 says “Furthermore, the Bill criminalizes begging without offering other livelihood options to transgender / Hijra people. Then they’ll have to starve and die!”

The protest commenced at 1 PM and concluded at 2:15 PM, the Pride march began after that. Hundreds of people supporting the LGBTQ community marched down the streets carrying rainbow flags highlighting their demands by shouting slogans. The March’s primary objectives were the withdrawal of the bill, implementation of the NALSA judgement and challenging the controversial nature of the Section 377 of IPC.

The poster making workshop cum volunteers' meeting for Kolkata Rainbow Pride Walk 2017 was held on 3 December 2017.

=== 2018 ===
On 30 December 2018, the last Sunday of the year, Kolkata's LGBTIQKHA+ community organised their annual event called the Rainbow Pride Walk which commenced from Jatin Das Park and concluded at the Vivekananda Park, located in the southern Kolkata. This year's Pride Parade was noteworthy since this was the first one since a part of Section 377 was read down by the Supreme Court in Navtej Singh Johar v. Union of India on 6 September 2018. The initiative aims at celebrating non-normative sexual orientation and invites people who have been discriminated for their Gender and Sexual Minorities, Disability and Profession (Sex work, Prostitution). This 17th Pride Walk, one of the oldest in India, saw a crowd of more than thousand people who witnessed this monumental event. Although the Pride Parade happily celebrated the reading down of Section 377, it simultaneously also protested against the Transgender Persons Bill, 2016 introduced by the Union Ministry of Social Justice and Empowerment, Government of India, subsequently passed by the Lok Sabha. This bill requires transgender people provide a medical examination report in order to be recognized as transgender people. Such a legislation only reintroduces surveillance by the government.

== See also ==
- Homosexuality in India
- Kolkata Rainbow Pride Festival
- LGBT culture in India
- LGBT rights in India
