= National Council for Transgender Persons =

Statutory body of the Government of India

Commission overview
- Formed: 21 August 2020
- Jurisdiction: Government of India
- Headquarters: New Delhi
- Annual budget: ₹762 crore (US$79 million) (2022 - 2023)
- Minister responsible: Virendra Kumar Khatik, Minister of Social Justice and Empowerment
- Commission executive: Laxmi Narayan Tripathi, Gopi Shankar Madurai, Zainab Javid Patel, Kak Chingtabam Shyamcand Sharma, Members from Transgender Community (as of 2020)
- Parent Commission: Ministry of Social Justice and Empowerment
- Website: Official Website

The National Council for Transgender Persons (NCTP) is the statutory body of the Government of India, generally concerned with advising the government on all policy matters affecting transgender and intersex persons, as well as people with diverse GIESC (gender identity/expression and sex characteristics) identities. It was established in 2020 under the provisions of the Transgender Persons (Protection of Rights) Act, 2019.

As of October 2020, NCTP is led by the Minister of Social Justice and Empowerment, Thawar Chand Gehlot. The council is composed of four representatives of the transgender community and one from the intersex community, one each from five different regions: the north, south, east, west and northeast. Additionally, several Joint secretary-level ex-officio members from various governmental ministries serve on the council as well as five expert members from nongovernmental organisations.

== Key members ==
=== Regional representatives ===
- Laxmi Narayan Tripathi
- Gopi Shankar Madurai
- Zainab P Rifai
- Shayamchand Kokchitbomb
- Meera Parida

=== Expert members ===
- Reshma Prasad
- Aryan Pasha
- Vihaan Peethambar
- C. Ganeshdas

== See also ==
- LGBT rights in India
- Transgender Persons (Protection of Rights) Act, 2019
- National Legal Services Authority v. Union of India
