= Anjali Gopalan =

Indian human rights and animal rights activist

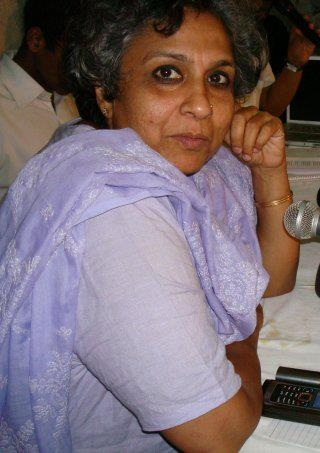
- Gopalan, circa 2009
- Born: 1 September 1957 (age 69); Madras, Madras State, India
- Occupations: LGBT rights activist, Executive Director of The Naz Foundation (India) Trust
- Awards: § Awards and recognition

Anjali Gopalan is an Indian human rights and animal rights activist. She is the founder and executive director of The Naz Foundation Trust.

In 2012, Time magazine placed Gopalan on its list of the 100 most influential people in the world.

== Early life ==
Anjali Gopalan was born on September 1, 1957, in Chennai, Tamil Nadu. Her father, Group Captain Dr KR Gopalan, was an officer in the Indian Air Force; her Punjabi mother was a homemaker. Gopalan did her schooling in La Martiniere Lucknow.

She studied in both India and the United States and received her Bachelor's degree in political science from Lady Shri Ram College for Women, as well as a postgraduate diploma in journalism and a Masters in International Development from the School of International studies, Jawaharlal Nehru University.

== Social work ==
"It is a reflection of what we are doing with our minorities. Be it in Kashmir, be it in the North East, be it rights for the sexual minority, animal rights, it is the same attitude. We are becoming more and more intolerant of the other". All individuals, if you give them the space, will prove to be productive citizens. "But if you impose your sets of right and wrong and therefore they have no right to live, then what can you expect from people?"

— Anjali Gopalan on re-criminalisation of homosexuality in India

=== Early work ===
Gopalan collaborated with community-based organizations in New York City, assisting migrants from Southeast Asia without valid documentation. She later founded the Naz Foundation.

=== 1990s ===
In 1994, upon returning to India, Gopalan established Delhi's first HIV clinic. The same year, she founded the Naz Foundation (India) Trust, an organization focused on supporting LGBT individuals and children affected by HIV. The foundation also works to promote the rights of individuals with marginalized sexual orientations.

=== 2000s ===
In 2000, Gopalan opened India’s first care home for orphaned and vulnerable HIV-positive children and women. She also provided training for healthcare professionals and caregivers on how to care for HIV-positive children in both residential and foster care settings.

In 2001, Gopalan’s organization, Naz Foundation, filed a Public Interest Litigation (PIL) challenging Section 377 of the Indian Penal Code, which criminalized homosexuality. The legal challenge sought to address the harassment and discrimination faced by individuals based on their sexual orientation. In 2009, the Delhi High Court ruled in favor of the Naz Foundation, declaring Section 377 a violation of individual rights.

When I started working in the 1990s on addressing rights of gay men, I never thought that I would be sitting in a place like Madurai and discussing about LGBT issues, I feel very ecstatic.

— Anjali Gopalan, on the Alan Turing Rainbow Festival Organized by Srishti Madurai

In 2001, Gopalan was awarded the Commonwealth Award for her work with marginalized communities. The Chennai-based Manava Seva Dharma Samvardhani presented her with the Sadguru Gnanananda Award in 2003 for her work in supporting those living with HIV/AIDS.

In March 2007, Gopalan was honored as a Woman Achiever by the Ministry of Women and Child Development, along with nine other awardees. On July 29, 2012, Gopalan inaugurated the Alan Turing Rainbow festival and flag of Asia's first genderqueer pride parade as a part of the Turing festival organized by Gopi Shankar Madurai of Srishti Madurai. This was the first gay pride parade attended by Gopalan. Since September 2, 2012, she has served as the advisory head of the committee of Srishti Madurai.

In 2012, Gopalan established an animal sanctuary called "All Creatures Great and Small" at Silakhari, Harayana.

On October 25, 2013, Gopalan was awarded the Chevalier de la Legion d'Honneur in the order of the legions of honor, the highest award from France; the award was presented to her by Najat Vallaud-Belkacem, Minister of Women's Rights for France. Gopalan is the first Indian Tamil woman awarded the "Legion of Honour".

== Awards and recognition ==
- People of the Year Award (2014)
- Chevalier de la Legion d'Honneur (2013)
- Time 100 Most Influential People in the World (2012)
- Woman Achiever Award by the Government of India (2007)
- Commonwealth Award (2001)

== In popular culture ==
In Hansal Mehta's 2015 Bollywood movie Aligarh, actress Nuthan Surya portrayed Gopalan.

== Anjali Gopalan Srishti Awards for Social Justice Journalism ==
The academic committee of Srishti Madurai awards the Anjali Gopalan Srishti Awards for Social Justice Journalism to social journalists. The first award was received by V. Mayilvaganan and V. Narayanswamy from The Times of India for highlighting issues regarding genderqueer people and Santhi Soundarajan.
