= Sab Rab De Bande =

Indian documentary

Sab Rab De Bande is an Indian documentary featuring stories of Sikh queer individuals in India. The 28-minute documentary film by Sukhdeep Singh (who is one of the stories himself) explores the perception of homosexuality in the Sikh religion. The film was premiered at Orinam's Reel Desire Queer Film Festival. The film was also a part of the South Asian Heritage Month in 2021. The documentary is narrated by Anwesh Sahoo.

== Reception ==
Gaysi appreciated the film and wrote "Sab Rab De Bande effectively captures the struggle that queer people go through when considering their faiths and religious identity.The lack of clear representation of Sikh queer persons in regional as well as popular media poses the difficulty of feeling included in their community. Firstpost on the other hand was relatively critical of the film and published, "The running time of the film does not allow for a deep dive into some of the ideas here. The filmmaker has carefully selected stories of people who are proud of their Sikh identity. They see no reason to abandon it. If the film had also included LGBTQ Sikhs who have given up their faith, the narrative would have been different from what it is at present. Feminism in India wrote a mixed review, Sab Rab De Bande successfully captures the battle that most queer people fight if they are to keep believing in their faith and also in themselves. Even though the documentary brings together various narratives which are valuable experiences from a community that has not spoken about queerness before, at times it feels like that it is too linear, too unidirectional, lacking a certain nuance.

== Awards ==
- First Runner Up (Documentary Film) at Chicago South Asian Film Festival.
