= Kolkata Rainbow Pride Festival =

South-Asian LGBT Organisation

Kolkata Rainbow Pride Festival (KRPF) is a Kolkata based open collective of individuals, networks and organizations that support LGBT rights. The collective organizes the annual Kolkata Rainbow Pride Walk, which has become the longest-running event of its kind in South Asia.

== History ==
The organization was formed on 1 May 2011 to take the initiative of organising Kolkata Rainbow Pride Walk. When KRPF started its journey, the Kolkata Rainbow Pride Walk (KRPW) received a footfall of 500 people and that reached the number of 1500 in the next year, i.e., 2012.

In 2012, KRPF organised an exhibition of paintings, photographs of various artists and posters, pamphlets of several NGOs working on gender and sexuality rights. Fifteen artists from India and abroad, and NGOs from different parts of India took part in this six-day exhibition titled ‘Broadening the Canvas - Celebrating Blemishes’ at the Bengal Art Gallery, ICCR, Ho Chi Minh Sarani.

== Events ==
KRPW runs a number of events such as art exhibits, film screenings, panel discussions, cultural events, and community hang outs.

It organises panel discussions on different social issues which are known as KRPF adda.
