= Naz Foundation (India) Trust =

Non-governmental organisation (NGO)

The Naz Foundation (India) Trust is a non-governmental organisation (NGO) in that country that works on HIV/AIDS and sexual health.

Based in the Indian capital New Delhi, the organization has been at the forefront of the battle against Section 377 of the Indian Penal Code that discriminates against individuals based on their sexual orientation. The organization was established in 1994 with the primary aim of serving various communities by responding to the issue of HIV/AIDS, raising awareness about prevention, providing care and support to children and people with HIV, and removing stigma and discrimination against them.

== History ==
In 2007, the Indian Ministry of Women and Child Development honored Anjali Gopalan as one of 10 women who have made outstanding contributions. The foundation was set up as there was a lack of governmental efforts in solving the HIV/AIDS epidermic problem. Naz India uses a holistic rights-based approach to fight HIV, focusing on prevention and treatment. Their primary recipients are marginalized HIV-infected populations. They provide quality care and support to HIV patients and address unbiased factual information and prevalence of HIV in India.

== Programs ==
Naz provides a variety of services to gays, lesbians, transgender people and those impacted by HIV/AIDS. This includes programs for men having sex with men (MSM); home-based medical case and other support for those with HIV/AIDS; peer education service to train student educators in training fellow students on sexuality, HIV/AIDS and sexual health; a Care Home for orphaned children with HIV/AIDS; an outpatient health clinic in New Delhi; training, education and community involvement activities on sexual health, sex and sexuality and related topics; and the GOAL program supporting underprivileged girls in India. It is a sports-based HIV-prevention initiative. Through Goal, young girls from economically disadvantaged backgrounds are educated about critical life skills such as sexual and reproductive health, gender equality and financial literacy to enable them to make healthy and informed choices.

The Milan Project for Men Having Sex with Men (MSM) & Transgender (TG), won the Winner of MTV Staying Alive Foundation Award in 2006 and 2007. This programme supports marginalized males and provides them with the necessary counselling, training programmes and interventions. There is also a drop-in centre which is a safe and confidential avenue for MSMs and TGs. Outreach workers visit sites regularly to distribute information, condom, lubricants and others.

Home Based Care programme was embarked in 2001 to support People Living with HIV/AIDS (PLWHA) with necessary healthcare and legal assistance to have the capacity to address the needs of HIV infection. It assists them to find employment by administering small loans and business opportunities. This is crucial as these marginalized groups of people receive minimal help from the public due to fear and stigma of HIV.

The Peer Education Programme funded by the Levi Strauss Foundation with the objective of impacting knowledge, attitudes, values and skills of the students conducting the trainings and of those being trained. These students will educate and pass on knowledge to many more of their peers.

A Care Home is set up in 2000 to take care of HIV+ orphans who are struggling to live and catering to their welfare, health, education and a safe and stigma-free environment. All children attend school regularly, have well-balanced diet and nutrition, are vaccinated and monitored by doctors and are emotionally stable. This Care Home expanded in 2010 to accommodate more HIV+ orphans and serve more needs of the children.

== Section 377 ==
Naz acted as the petitioner in the Delhi High Court case that found that Section 377 of the Indian Penal Code was unconstitutional.

Section 377 states that:

377. Unnatural offences: Whoever voluntarily has carnal intercourse against the order of nature with any man, woman or animal, shall be punished with imprisonment for life, or with imprisonment of either description for term which may extend to ten years, and shall also be liable to fine. Explanation: Penetration is sufficient to constitute the carnal intercourse necessary to the offense described in this section.

In the court's decision, Chief Justice A.P. Shah and Justice S. Muralidhar determined that Section 377, as it pertains to consensual sex among people above 18 years of age, in violation of major parts of India's Constitution. "Consensual sex amongst adults is legal, which includes even gay sex and sex among the same sexes," they said. The law violates Article 14 of the Constitution, which guarantees all people "equality before the law;" Article 15, which prohibits discrimination "on grounds of religion, race, caste, sex or place of birth;" and Article 21, which guarantees "protection of life and personal liberty," the judges said.

As a result of its important role and leadership in the Section 377 case, CNN named Naz as one of those organizations and people "Who mattered most in 2009"

== Collaboration with other organizations ==
Naz India implemented the Goal Programme, a Standard Chartered Bank Community Investment initiative, in 2006. It uses netball and life skills education to transform the lives of young underprivileged girls in India, on and off the court. It is a collaborative and multi-stakeholder initiative to build self-confidence and give adolescent girls a better life.

Naz participated in the Heroes AIDS Project, a national HIV/AIDS initiative launched in 2004 to work with media organizations and societal leaders in India. Its objectives are to address the issues of HIV/AIDS and reduce discrimination by advocacy and communications.

Naz worked with The Condom Project (TCP), to educate the public about condoms and its prevention of transmission of HIV. TCP makes use of non-traditional approaches like art, performance and educational programs to reduce social stigma and relay the message that condoms save lives.

== Funding/Support ==
The foundation's funding comes largely from individual and organization donations. Among its organization contributors are the Standard Chartered Bank and the Levi Strauss Foundation It also counts on volunteer support to help conduct various services.

== Awards and recognition ==
- Founder Anjali Gopalan received the People of the Year Award from Limca Book of Records (2014)
- Sport and the City Award by Global Sports Forum (2010)
- Best Project Award by Beyond Sport (2009)
- Investing in Women Award from International Centre for Research on Women (2008)

== See also ==
- LGBT rights in India
- LGBT rights in Sri Lanka
- Tamil Sexual Minorities
