= Srishti Madurai =

First genderqueer & LGBTQIA student volunteer group of India

- Founded: September 2, 2011 in Madurai, India
- Location: Madurai

Srishti Madurai was established on 2 September 2011 by Gopi Shankar Madurai as the first genderqueer and LGBT student volunteer group designed to address the problems of LGBT people in the non-metro cities of Tamil Nadu. In October 2011, Srishti Madurai launched India's first helpline for intersex, genderqueer, and LGBT people in Madurai. In June 2013, the helpline turned to offer service for 24 hours with a tagline "Just having someone understanding to talk to can save a life". Srishti Madurai also organized Asia's first Genderqueer Pride Parade at Madurai.

Srishti Madurai coined the regional Tamil terms for genderqueer people and published Maraikkappatta Pakkangal, the first book on gender-variants in Tamil. On 22 April 2019, the Madras High Court (Madurai Bench) passed a landmark judgment and issued a direction to ban sex-selective surgeries on intersex infants while referring to the work of Srishti Madurai. The Court took note of the rampant practice of compulsory sex reassignment surgeries performed on intersex infants and children.

The first ever state policy briefing on intersex human rights was organised with Intersex Asia Network, COC Netherlands and the Ministry of Foreign Affairs in July 2019.

== See also ==
- LGBT history in India
- Tamil sexual minorities
