= Gopi Shankar Madurai =

Indian activist and Indigenist (born 1991)

- Shankar in 2017

South Region Representative of the National Council for Transgender Persons
- Resigned
- In office August 2020 – 20 March 2022
- Appointed by: Government of India
- Minister: Virendra Kumar Khatik

Personal details
- Born: 13 April 1991 (age 35) Madurai, Tamil Nadu, India
- Education: American College, Madurai
- Occupation: Activist, Writer, Public Speaker.
- Awards: The Commonwealth Nations Youth Worker Award 2016, HCR Queen's Young Leader Award 2017

Gopi Shankar Madurai (born 13 April 1991) is an Indian activist and Indigenist. They (Note: Shankar uses ze, a gender-neutral neopronoun. Singular they is used here.) are among the youngest people, and the first openly intersex and genderqueer person, to serve on a statutory body in India. In 2016, they were a candidate in the 2016 Tamil Nadu Legislative Assembly election. They founded the Srishti Madurai. In January 2026, Shankar was appointed as the Special Monitor for SOGIESC rights in the National Human Rights Commission of India.

Shankar's advocacy led the Madras High Court (Madurai Bench) to direct the Government of Tamil Nadu to prohibit forced sex-selective surgeries on intersex infants. In December 2017, Shankar was elected to the executive board of ILGA. In August 2020, the Ministry of Social Justice and Empowerment appointed Shankar as the South Regional representative on the National Council for Transgender Persons. They advocated for an "others" option in the sex field on application forms for political parties and central universities, including Jawaharlal Nehru University. Shankar also contributed to civil rights advancements for transgender people, such as pilot licenses for trans men and property inheritance rights for trans women. The Juvenile Justice Committee and POCSO Committee have consulted Shankar on issues affecting infants and children with diverse sex characteristics.

== Early life ==
Shankar was born as Sarvapunya in Sellur slum at Madurai, Tamil Nadu. At the age of fourteen, they started volunteering Ramakrishna Mission. Later they were accepted as a probationer for being a monk at Ramakrishna Math. In 2005, Shankar was given spiritual initiation under the spiritual lineage of Swami Vivekananda by Swami Gitanandaji (Former Vice-president of Ramakrishna Math and Mission) who is also a disciple of Swami Virajananda. During Shankar's tenure in Ramakrishna Math, Shankar served as the assistant to the editor of Sri Ramakrishna Vijayam Magazine. They were also mentored by Pravrajika Bhaktiprana and Pravrajika Ramaprana the sanyasinis of Sri Sarada Math.

In April 2010 Shankar left Ramakrishna Math to pursue Religion, Philosophy, and Sociology studies at The American College in Madurai (affiliated to Madurai Kamaraj University). They practiced yoga for over 15 years and taught it as an instructor for five years, offering free classes to more than 5,000 children. Shankar also taught Indian philosophy to Westerners, including renowned Irish musician Tony MacMahon. They freelanced for New Horizon Media Pvt Ltd (a Tamil publications company). In 2017, Shankar received a "Leading Change" leadership degree from the University of Cambridge, awarded exclusively to the Queen's Young Leaders Awardees.

== Social activism ==
Shankar founded the Srishti Madurai Volunteer Movement, one of the first inclusive, non-funded pro bono groups in India. It engages academics, independent scholars, human rights activists, environmentalists, animal rights advocates, and LGBTQIA+ and genderqueer activists to protect indigenous traditions. In October 2011, Shankar launched India's first helpline for genderqueer and LGBTQIA+ people in Madurai. In June 2013, the helpline expanded to 24-hour service under the tagline "Just having someone understanding to talk to can save a life". Shankar organized Asia's first Genderqueer Pride Parade in Madurai and introduced LGBTQIA+ courses into the curricula of several schools and universities. Shankar served as a panelist and chair at University Grants Commission (UGC) and Indian Council of Social Science and Research (ICSSR)-sponsored national seminars. They conducted more than 85 seminars and interactive sessions on gender and sexuality for 8,000 students in Madurai. Shankar coined Tamil terms for genderqueer people and authored Maraikkappatta Pakkangal, the first Tamil book on gender variants. In April 2015, they were invited by Tiruchi Siva to witness the passage of the Rights of Transgender Persons Bill, 2014 in the Rajya Sabha. For contributions to gender minorities in Hinduism, Shankar received the "Young Hindu Award" from writer Aravindan Neelakandan and Joe D Cruz at the 6th Hindu Spiritual Services Fair.

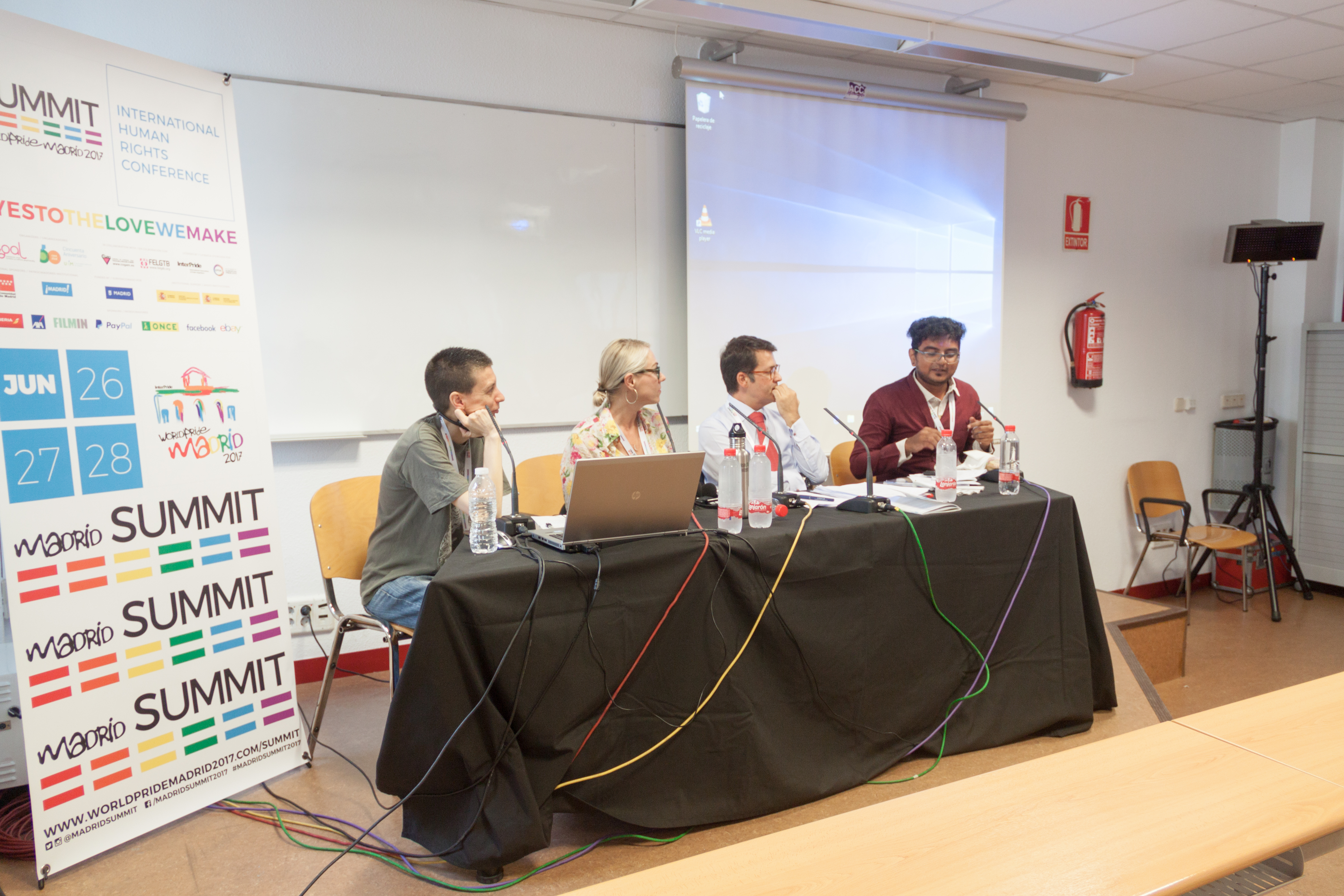
Shankar speaking on intersex and Medical Violations at the Autonomous University of Madrid with Katrina Karkazis of the Stanford University School of Medicine and Carlos Duarte from the Ministry of Foreign Affairs of Portugal

Shankar petitioned state and central governments on behalf of Asian Games medalist Santhi Soundarajan, who was stripped of her medal after a gender test. They filed complaints with the National Commission for Scheduled Castes and National Human Rights Commission and launched the "Justice For Santhi Campaign", which helped secure her a permanent position as an athletics coach with the Tamil Nadu Sports Development Authority in December 2016.

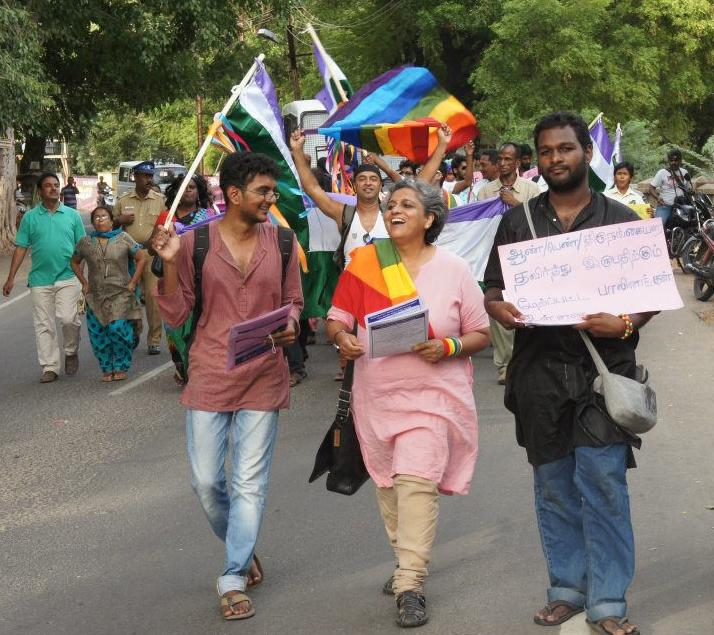
Shankar with Anjali Gopalan at Asia's first genderqueer pride parade in Madurai

Shankar spoke at the WorldPride Madrid Summit in 2017, co-chairing a session with former Director-General of UNESCO Federico Mayor Zaragoza, former United Nations Permanent Forum on Indigenous Issues chairperson Myrna Cunningham, and Zanele Muholi, contributing to the Madrid Summit Declaration.

The State Council of Educational Research and Training (Government of Tamil Nadu) consulted Shankar for inputs on sex, gender, and sexuality studies for the 2017 New School Curriculum Development Committee, aiming to include the LGBTQIA+ community in school curricula. They also contributed to the panel for a Theological Reader on Gender & Sexuality for the National Council of Churches in India.

Shankar is a founding member of Intersex Asia, the first regional collective for intersex individuals and organizations. In July 2019, they organized India's first state policy briefing on intersex human rights.

In 2020, Shankar was a lead petitioner in the Delhi High Court case Abhijit Iyer Mitra & Ors v. UOI, seeking recognition of non-heterosexual marriages and same-sex unions under the Hindu Marriage Act, 1955.

== Transgender activism ==
Shankar through Srishti Madurai helpline rescued several trans women from forced sex work and begging. They also mentor the "Transgender India" forum, India's first 24/7 holistic help and support discussion forum for intersex and transgender people, as well as their families.

Shankar and trans woman S. Swapna staged a protest in Madurai collectorate on 7 October 2013 demanding reservation and to permit alternate genders to appear for examinations conducted by TNPSC, UPSC, SSC and Bank Exams. Later, Swapna successfully moved the Madras High Court in 2013 seeking permission to write the TNPSC Group II exam as a female candidate.

As the south regional representative of National Council for Transgender Persons Gopi ensured justice for transgender persons on various civil and human rights related cases. They ensured inheritance rights for Transgender people and invoked Transgender Persons (Protection of Rights) Act, 2019 along with The Protection of Children from Sexual Offences Act, Scheduled Caste and Scheduled Tribe (Prevention of Atrocities) Act, 1989 in several cases dealing with sexual abuse of gender non-conforming children in the southern states of India.

In March 2022, newspaper The Hindu reported that Shankar resigned from the post of the south regional representative of NCTP, citing bureaucratic harassment and insensitivity. The newspaper quoted Shankar saying that the 'ceremonial' position was not serving the needs of the transgender community. Shankar later stated that they would not resign until the end of the tenure and would continue to serve in the body.

== Death threats and attacks ==
In 2016, during their election campaign, Shankar faced sexual and verbal harassment and death threats from a member of a political party. The Tamil Nadu Police provided three security officers for their protection during campaigning. Shankar criticized homophobia and transphobia in the Tamil Muslim community after the youth wing of the Indian National League accused LGBTQIA+ people of being "cultural terrorists". Posters calling for the "death sentence under section 377" and warning of terror against the community—claiming homosexuality was "against Tamil culture"—appeared a day after the Orlando nightclub shooting.

In January 2022, Shankar was threatened by members of a certain political party (allegedly DMK) in Mamallapuram.

In November 2022, Shankar was attacked by an unknown group of six people in New Delhi. The attackers first demanded money, and when they were refused, they abused and physically assaulted Shankar. This was the fifth instance of violence that ze suffered.

== Protection for intersex people in India ==
In 2015, Shankar urged the Parliament of India to include intersex people in transgender rights legislation. They filed a complaint with the National Human Rights Commission to ban forced sex-selective surgeries on intersex infants and ensure their constitutional rights; the NHRC directed the Union Health Ministry to respond within eight weeks.

On 22 April 2019 the Madras High Court (Madurai Bench) passed a landmark judgment and issued direction to ban sex-selective surgeries on intersex infants based on the works of Gopi Shankar, the court took note of the issue of the rampant practice of compulsory sex reassignment surgeries performed on inter-sex infants and children. The Court also expressed its gratitude to Shankar, noting that their work has had been a "humbling and enlightening experience for the Court".

In September 2019, Shankar submitted a report to the United Nations Convention on the Rights of Persons with Disabilities committee on LGBTQI+ people with disabilities, focusing on intersex persons in India. The committee issued strong recommendations to the Government of India.

In October 2020, the Delhi Commission for Protection of Child Rights appointed Shankar and Anjali Gopalan as expert advisors on an intersex human rights case. Based on their recommendations, the commission urged the Delhi government to ban unnecessary medical interventions on intersex infants and children.

In addition to supporting Santhi Soundarajan, Shankar has advocated for female athletes with intersex traits, including Caster Semenya, Pinki Pramanik, Dutee Chand, and Imane Khelif. They have shared their stories in print media and co-platformed with them at events to raise awareness.

In April 2024, Shankar filed a public interest litigation, Gopi Shankar M. v. Union of India, in the Supreme Court of India. The bench, comprising Chief Justice D. Y. Chandrachud, Justice J. B. Pardiwala, and Justice Manoj Misra, sought responses from the Union government and the Central Adoption Resource Authority (CARA) regarding provisions for recording births and deaths of intersex persons, their inclusion in the census, and issuance of identity cards distinguishing sex and gender.

== Awards and accolades ==
Shankar was also awarded the Diversity Leadership Award 2016 by the World HRD Congress and featured in 'India's 8 LGBT role models under 30' by Gaysi for voicing intersex rights in India. Out Leadership recommended Gopi Shankar as one of the expert and openly advocating leaders on LGBT+ issues along with minister Arun Jaitley and human rights activist Anjali GopalanIndia Times listed Shankar as one of the 11 Human Rights Activists Whose Life Mission Is To Provide Others With A Dignified Life They were the first and only intersex person officially invited to the swearing ceremony of the Prime Minister Narendra Modi in June 2024 In February 2021 Senior DMK Political Party Leader and Member of Parliament Kanimozhi hosted a feast in Madurai for Shankar to discuss the issues pertaining to Intersex persons

- Children's Champion State Award 2023- The Delhi Commission for Protection of Child Rights (DCPCR) conferred by The Delhi Government and presented by Hon'ble Justice Dr S. Muralidhar
- Hero Awards (Community Hero 2021)- APCOM, Thailand. Asia Pacific Coalition on Male Sexual Health
- Global Innovator 2020 - Human Rights Campaign
- Chanakya Award 2018 - Vision India Foundation
- The Commonwealth Youth Worker Finalist 2016 - The Commonwealth Secretariat, London.
- Highly Commended Runner Queen's Young Leader 2017 - Queen Elizabeth Diamond Jubilee Trust, in partnership with Comic Relief and the Royal Commonwealth Society
- 16 Inspiring LGBTQIA people in the World 2017 - Vagabomb, (ScoopWhoop Media)
- Youth of the Year 2016 - Neeya Naana, Star Vijay TV
- Great People of Great Madurai - Radio Mirchi Award 2016
- Young Hindu Award 2014 - Tamil Hindu Team, Chennai
- Star Speaker Award 2013 - PPK Show, Star Vijay TV
- Star Speaker Award 2012 - PPK Show, Star Vijay TV

Year	Award	Honouring body	Notes
2016	The Commonwealth Youth Worker Award	The Commonwealth, London	Awarded for using arts and sports as a social tool to empower young people with positive alternate space

Year	Title	Honouring body	Notes
2017	Highly Commended Runner Queen's Young Leader Award 2017	Queen Elizabeth Diamond Jubilee Trust, in partnership with Comic Relief and the Royal Commonwealth Society.	Recognised as agent of change for the remarkable work done by Shankar in LGBTQIA community.

== Media and Books ==
GOPI a Brazilian/English Documentary movie on Shankar's life directed by Viviane D'Avilla was premiered at Festival do Rio 2018 have won multiple awards.

Shankar appeared on Living Foodz Dakshin Diaries to curate the gender specific sacred spaces of Indigenous gender-variants of ancient India.

Singer Chinmayi produced a three part YouTube video series with Shankar to support Intersex Human Rights in Tamil Nadu.

National Award winning Journalist Sohini Chattopadhyay penned a brief timeline on Shankar's life and activism in her book The Day I Became a Runner: A Women's History of India through the Lens of Sport published by Harper Collins in 2023

== Bibliography ==
=== Author ===
- Maraikappatta Pakkangal (Hidden Pages) Unedited Version, Illustrator Julian Wrangler, Germany, Srishti Madurai., 2014, ISBN 9781500380939.
- Maraikkappatta Pakkangal: Paal - Paalinam - Paaliyal Orunginaivu- Gopi Shankar (Edited Version), 296 Pages, ISBN 9789386737328, Publisher: Kizhakku Pathippagam, 2017.

=== Contributor ===
- Definitions- Understanding Gender, Sex, and Sexuality. A Theological Reader on Human Sexuality and Gender Diversities: Envisioning Inclusivity - ISBN 9788184656220. Publisher: ISPCK and National Council of Churches in India (NCCI). 2017
- Biological basis of Bigender identity and its medical potential: Frontier Vistas in Modern Biotechnology- ISBN 9788192866109. Publisher: Department of Immunology & Microbiology, The American College, Madurai. 2013

== See also ==
- List of people with non-binary gender identities
- List of intersex people
