= Genderqueer =

Gender identity outside of the gender binary

- Definition: Gender identity outside of the gender binary
- Classification: Gender identity

Other terms
- Associated terms: Non-binary; Third gender; gender nonconforming

Flag
- Genderqueer pride flag Genderqueer pride flag
- Flag name: Genderqueer pride flag
- Meaning: Lavender: androgyny or queerness, white: agender identity, green: those whose identities which are defined outside the binary

Genderqueer as a term refers to a gender identity that is outside the male/female gender binary. It often serves as an umbrella term for gender-nonconforming gender identities or alongside the term non-binary, but has also gained a distinction through its use to disrupt the idea of a gender binary entirely. Genderqueer individuals are typically considered a part of the transgender and wider queer community.

== History ==
The term genderqueer first appeared in queer zines of the 1980s and early 1990s. It gained prominence in the mid-1990s through activists, such as Riki Anne Wilchins, who used it to describe individuals deviating from traditional gender norms. In a 1995 newsletter published by The Transexual Menace, Wilchins wrote that the new fight against gender oppression was political and:

It's about all of us who are genderqueer: diesel dykes and stone butches, leatherqueens and radical fairies, nelly fags, crossdressers, intersexed, transexuals, transvestites, transgendered, transgressively gendered, and those of us whose gender expressions are so complex they haven't even been named yet.

Similar terms that preceded genderqueer included genderfuck and genderbender. In the context of 1990s early queer activism, genderqueer began as a political stance for resisting the gender binary; the term carried the non-normative and anti-assimilationist connotations of the recently reclaimed word queer. In 2002, the term had further dissemination through the anthology GenderQueer: Voices From Beyond the Sexual Binary.

Genderqueer evolved into both an umbrella term for identities outside the gender binary and an adjective or self-identity term for those who challenge or diverge from conventional gender norms, or who "queer" gender. The rise of the internet and public identification by celebrities brought the term genderqueer into mainstream awareness during the late 2000s and early 2010s.

== Symbols and flags ==
The genderqueer pride flag was designed in 2011 by Marilyn Roxie. Lavender represents androgyny or queerness, white represents agender identity, and green represents those whose identities which are defined outside the binary.
