= Women's Support Group =

Sri Lankan organization dedicated to helping lesbian, bisexual and transgender women

The Women's Support Group (WSG) is a Sri Lankan organisation dedicated to helping lesbian, bisexual and transgender women. It was set up in 1999 by amongst others Rosanna Flamer-Caldera. It has won the Felipa de Souza Award twice.

== History ==
The Women's Support Group (WSG) was set up in 1999 as an offshoot from Companions on a Journey. The founders had joined CoJ and set up a support group for lesbian, bisexual and transgender women, which then took on its own identity over time. The group organised a national convention for lesbians in 1999 which encountered hostility and the group also experienced discrimination from the rest of the women's movement; at the first International Women’s Day meeting at Viharamahadevi Park, some women were upset that the WSG was there and Sunila Abeysekera had to intercede on their behalf.

In 2003, around 20 women were involved. The activities of the WSG in the early 2000s included workshops in rural areas about sexuality, women’s cricket tournaments, media campaigns and "The Clothesline Project" which drew attention to the issue of violence against women. As of 2007, the WSG ran a library, a safe house in Colombo and various support groups.

== Awards ==
The Women’s Support Group won the Felipa de Souza Award in 2001, alongside Companions on a Journey. It won the award again in 2014, shared jointly with Gay Japan News, KRYSS (Malaysia), O (Pakistan) and the Rainbow Rights Project (Philippines).

== See also ==
- Equal Ground
- LGBT rights in Sri Lanka
