= Companions on a Journey =

Sri Lankan LGBT support group

Companions on a Journey (CoJ) is a Sri Lankan LGBT support group founded in 1995. It campaigns to change the laws which criminalise homosexuality and to educate people about sexuality. The Women's Support Group grew out of CoJ, the two organisations sharing the Felipa de Souza Award in 2001. By 2014, CoJ had over 1,400 members and branches across the country.

== History ==
Companions on a Journey (CoJ) was established in 1995 with Sherman de Rose as executive director. It was funded by the Dutch government and Alliance London, an English HIV/AIDS support group. CoJ immediately provoked controversy because it was the first Sri Lankan gay rights group; the offices were attacked and staff were assaulted. Homosexual acts are illegal in Sri Lanka and could receive a sentence of up to twelve years in prison. Whilst convictions are rare, it is common for people to be blackmailed or intimidated. CoJ has been campaigning since its foundation to change the law.

Following the International Lesbian and Gay Association Asia regional conference in Mumbai in 2002, Companions on a Journey held a press conference in Sri Lanka at which de Rose stated the organisation's aims were to achieve LGBT equality and to change the belief that homosexuality was a disease which could be cured. Rosanna Flamer-Caldera, who ran the Women's Support Group, said she agreed with de Rose about the overall aims and that her group also worked on its own causes, mentioning a recent case in which a lesbian woman had been threatened with rape because of her sexuality. The Women's Support Group was set up in 1999 and held a lesbian convention in Colombo in December 1999.

After the 2004 tsunami struck, CoJ calculated that 34 of its members had been killed. The group used its drop-in centre to distribute aid and helped its members financially. Interviewed by the BBC in 2005, de Rose said "We aren't expecting miracles, but I think we're getting there, bit by bit". At that time, as well as its legal activism, CoJ was organising a monthly newsletter and full moon parties. It had a drop-in centre in Colombo and had opened other ones in Kandy and Anuradhapura. In 2008, Companions on a Journey and the Women’s Support Group put on the first Solidarity Games in Colombo, which were attended by over 300 people.

Rivira (a Sinhala weekly newspaper) published a stories in 2011 which accused CoJ of spreading homosexuality and outed several people. One man lost his home after his name was publicised and CoJ was forced to stop operations temporarily. As of 2014, Companions on a Journey had over 1,400 members and branches across Sri Lanka.

== Award ==
Companions on a Journey and the Women’s Support Group won the Felipa de Souza Award in 2001.

== See also ==
- LGBT rights in Sri Lanka
- Equal Ground
