= Lesbianism in Sri Lanka =

Lesbianism in Sri Lanka was legal until 1995 when the article prohibiting homosexual sex was expanded to cover homosexual sex conducted between women. Lesbians have historically faced challenges relating to the sexual discrimination against women as well as the homophobia and discrimination against sexual minorities, although Sri Lanka itself is often considered a leader for women's rights in South Asia.

== Human rights and legalities ==
=== Penal code ===
The sections 365 and 365A proscribe that any unnatural offences or acts of gross indecency between persons should be punished with "rigorous imprisonment for a term not less than 10 years and not exceeding twenty years with a fine and compensation".

=== Vagrants ordinance ===
The section 07 of 1841 criminalizes soliciting and acts of indecency in public places, with a punishment of no more than six months and a fine of 100 rupees.

== History ==
During a proposal to decriminalize homosexual sex between males, the parliament decided to criminalize lesbian sex. This perspective was extended to the media when the press council refused to penalize a newspaper that had published letters attacking lesbians. No lesbians were convicted under this law.

The IGLHRC found from a two-year long research project that female "LBT people faced this frequent violence and daily discrimination without any protection from the state". Reuters cited how a 'formerly friendly neighbours threatened two women with rape after discovering they were a lesbian couple.' Some lesbians on sports teams lost their places once they came out.

== Culture ==
The majority of lesbians communicate and socialize through the internet. Younger lesbians organize parties and gatherings through media such as Facebook and WhatsApp. Various online communities serve as a means for lesbians to find romantic partners.

Sunila Abeysekera, Feminist and Human Rights Activist

"As women’s rights activists, we know very well the extent of discrimination and violence suffered by women who dare to remain unmarried, who do not bear children, who bear children outside of marriage, who seek, obtain and assist in abortions, who take responsibility for families and households in the absence of male family members, who wear their hair short, and who otherwise violate gender norms. Each of these cases involves women who challenge the heteronormative framework that teaches us from a very early age that women should marry men, be faithful, be good housewives, never refuse sex with their husbands, bear children, care for the household, and express a particular model of femininity, with no consideration of the physical, emotional and psychological cost for women."

— http://www.outrightinternational.org/content/memory-sunila-abeysekera

9% of LGBT in Sri Lanka reported they were in a homosexual relationship with another female.

Few cultural pursuits are available. Bars and clubs exist that cater exclusively to sexual minorities, including lesbians, but they are far outnumbered by mainstream establishments. A handful of media productions have been made about lesbians. Grass Rooted has created several theatre productions showing lesbians in a positive light.

Women are expected to wear a sari. Nonconformity is frowned, although most organizations do not have documented dress codes.

Some nationalist movements promoting Sinhlaese ethnolingustic groups attacked the lesbian community, protesting at major events celebrating homosexuality. The influential Buddhist Asgiriya Chapter supports equality for sexual minorities.

=== Social issues ===
Reports suggest that lesbians feel unable to openly complain about discrimination due to social stigma. This allows them to be open to abuse from the police despite human rights lawyers and judicial officials stating, "police do not have any right to interfere in adults personal sexual choices".

Another concern is the financial and personal consequences of coming out as a lesbian, fearing that they will be shunned by their family and lose their jobs. The government stated that anti-discrimination laws apply to sexuality.

Lesbians generally face a worse climate of ill-treatment at home due to the lower status of women in Sri Lankan society, in particular on unmarried women in rural areas, due to the culture of remaining at home until marriage.

== See also ==
- LGBT rights in Sri Lanka
- Sexual minorities in Sri Lanka
