= Colombo Pride =

Annual LGBT event in Colombo, Sri Lanka

- The official poster designed for Colombo Pride in 2022.
- Genre: Pride parade and festival
- Frequency: Annual
- Venue: Colombo
- Country: Sri Lanka
- Years active: 18
- Founder: Equal Ground

Colombo Pride is an annual LGBTQ+ pride celebration held in Sri Lanka, chiefly hosted by Equal Ground, along with other queer rights advocacy groups since 2005. Although being mostly unpopular during the 2010s, the post COVID-19 period and subsequent socio-political crises paved the way for a larger, week-long celebration in 2022, with a three-day film festival titled "Abhimani", a music and dance festival, competitions and related events.

It was recorded that in the first event held in 2005, 350 people had attended, and participation has increased ever since, with the movement gaining much recognition, praise and support, and being headlined in both local and international media outlets. The newspaper Ceylon Today describes the event as a "week-long joyous celebration with a variety of events full of color, music and diversity."

== See also ==
- Abhimani Queer Film Festival
- Equal Ground
- LGBT rights in Sri Lanka
- Sexual minorities in Sri Lanka
