= Homosexuality in Sri Lanka =

Homosexuality in Sri Lanka has been documented since ancient times. Since the 17th century, homosexual intercourse has de jure prohibited through the Penal Code first implemented under the colonialism, but human rights organizations write that arrests are rare and prosecutions only relate to non-consensual sex and prostitution (as in India after the legalisation of homosexuality).

There is substantial evidence that homosexuality was abundant in ancient society, and various artworks and literary works attest to the tolerant and even supportive attitudes of the people of the island towards those engaged in homosexual acts. Discrimination against homosexuality was largely imported from the western world through Christian-affiliated morality during European colonialism, starting with Portuguese colonialism and culminating in the 17th century Penal Code, virtually identical to the Indian Penal Code of the British Empire.

A number of laws de jure prohibit various homosexuality-related activities, though these are viewed as being unimplemented for consensual homosexuality. There are efforts currently underway in the judiciary and parliament to overturn these laws, and there has been positive support from both the judiciary and political establishment.

A 2021 study found that 1,469,574 identified as LGBTQ, with the vast majority being of homosexual or bisexual nature, and younger age cohorts being more likely to identify as homosexual in comparison to older generations.

== Demographics ==
A 2021 study found that 1,469,574 identified as LGBTQ, with the vast majority being of homosexual or bisexual nature, and younger age cohorts being more likely to identify as homosexual in comparison to older generations.

== Politics ==
Sri Lanka has numerous laws that prohibit homosexual activities and provides minimal protections, though human rights organisations largely state that these laws are not implemented for consensual sex.

=== Government ===
The main political parties of Sri Lanka have all stated their support for decriminalisation of homosexuality. The leading politicians of the main far-right, centre-right, centre-left and far-left parties have declared support for LGBTQ, as well as the main Tamil political party TNA, though individual members of parliament still retain various views on the topic. The ruling governments have repeatedly stated that they wish to decriminalise homosexual intercourse, but have faced opposition from vocal lawmakers in parliament and the cabinet. The UNP has even been viewed as being run by "a decadent club of homosexuals", though this may not be viewed as homophobic due to the connotations of corruption based on "old boys club" ties rather than negative perceptions of homosexuality.

In June 2024, the Parliament of Sri Lanka passed the Gender Equality Bill, but this was blocked by the Supreme Court of Sri Lanka on constitutional grounds due to allowing the possibility of same-sex marriage and liberal attitudes towards gender identity choice. It is likely that the parliament will challenge this ruling. According to lawyers dealing with the government, the lack of an opposition argument due to a late filing meant that the Supreme Court ruled in favour of the appellants, and calls have been made by the government for the bill to be looked at again by the Court.

=== Judiciary ===
The judiciary has been largely progressive on homosexuality, but lacks powers to reform law and should only implement the law as intended. Human rights organisations and NGOs have repeatedly stated that they do not know of any prosecutions for homosexual sex in recent times. A prosecution by a lower court from the early 2000s was taken to the Supreme Court and suspended with a token fine, with the court stating that though consensual sex should not be prohibited by law, it remains on the books nevertheless. In mid 2022 the Supreme Court also stated that decriminalization of homosexual intercourse would not be unconstitutional.

However, in 2024, the Supreme Court of Sri Lanka blocked the Gender Equality Bill, which had been passed by parliament, on the basis that it was unconstitutional due to allowing the possibility of same-sex marriage and liberal attitudes towards gender identity choice. Later in response the president referred to the more progressive moves made in previous years, questioning the logic of the Supreme Court. According to lawyers dealing with the government, the lack of an opposition argument due to a late filing meant that the Supreme Court ruled in favour of the appellants, and calls have been made for the bill to be looked at again by the Court.

=== Ombudsman ===
The Human Rights Commission of Sri Lanka has voiced support for homosexuality as well, saying that the law needs to be reformed.

The Committee on the Elimination of Discrimination against Women (CEDAW) ruled that a petitioner's "rights had been violated by penal laws that criminalise consensual same-sex sexual relationships between women and that it also violated my rights to non-discrimination. The CEDAW also urged that I be protected from gender-based violence, allowed participation in public and political life, and entitled to equality before the law and family rights.”

=== Religion ===
Religious organisations have taken various stances on the topic of homosexuality.

==== Buddhism ====
Buddhists organisations are taking multiple views on topics relating to homosexuality. The influential Buddhist chapter, Asgiriya Chapter, came out in support of extending rights to LGBT, including support to amend the constitution. A monk based in Sri Lanka and Singapore stated that being homosexual in Buddhism is acceptable. A literary novel about homosexual sex in the clergy, who are expected to be celibate, caused controversy leading to the arrest of the novelist on religious hatred laws.

==== Others ====
The Catholic Church was reported as remaining silent in the discussions about homosexuality and the decriminalization of homosexual intercourse. Muslim politicians have opposed legalising homosexuality.

=== Law ===
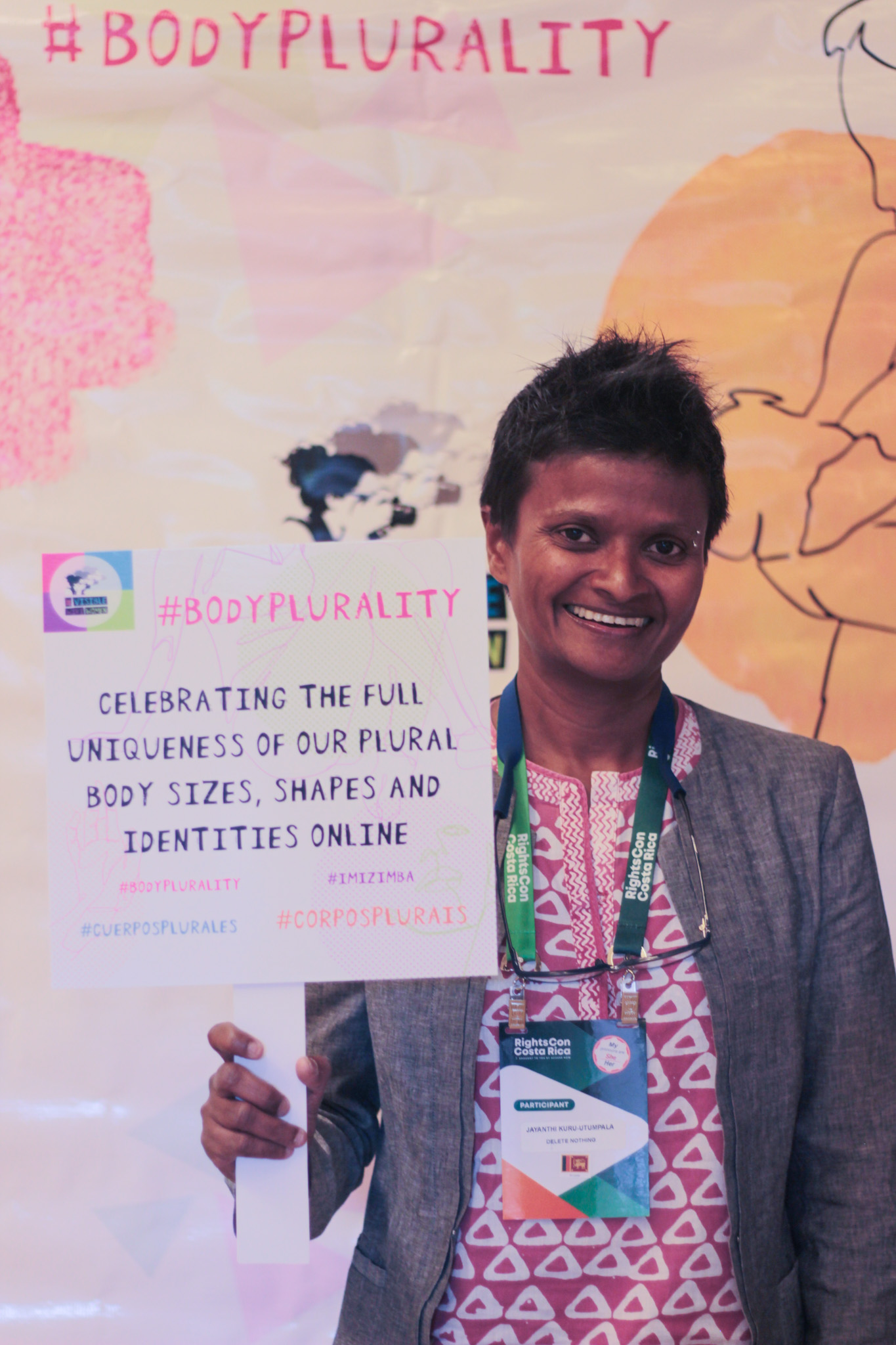
A Sri Lankan LGBTQ protester

==== Homosexual intercourse ====
The sections 365 and 365A proscribe that any unnatural offences or acts of gross indecency between persons should be punished with "rigorous imprisonment for a term not less than 10 years and not exceeding twenty years with a fine and compensation".

==== Vagrants Ordinance ====
The section 07 of 1841 criminalizes soliciting and acts of indecency in public places, with a punishment of no more than six months and a fine of 100 rupees.

== History ==
There were no legal restrictions on homosexuality or transsexuality for the general population of the island prior to early modern period and colonialism, however certain dharmic moral codes forbade sexual misconduct (of both heterosexual and homosexual nature) among the upper class of priests and monks, and religious codes of foreign religions such as Christianity and Islam imposed homophobic rules on their populations.

Many philosophical works by Hindu scholars listed homosexual acts among equivalent heterosexual acts as sexual misconduct, though punishments for the homosexual acts were often less severe than those for the heterosexual acts. These works were not aimed at the lay people but rather for the class of monks and priests who were often expected to abstain from sexual activity.

The concept of homosexuality was widely known in the prevailing Hindu culture by the time Buddhism was founded. The monastic discipline explicitly contained homosexual sex alongside a variety of prohibitions against heterosexual sex, and it also explicitly stated that these rules were to only be applied to monks and not the lay people. It is notable that homosexual masturbation is not considered a punishable offense by the order.

Though homophobia was largely imported from the western world during the medieval period, it is highly likely that the north western fringes of the Indian subcontinent that are now part of Pakistan had socio-cultural norms heavily influenced by Zoroastrianism (from around 500BCE) and Islam (from around 700AD). In contrast large parts of the far south that are now part of South India and Sri Lanka did not have legal restrictions against homosexuality until the advent of European colonialism in the 1700s. Colonialism from Europe also brought with it more centralized legal codes that imposed Christian-European morals that were homophobic in nature, including criminalizing sex between two people of the same gender, and criminalizing transsexuality.

In the 21st century following independence, there has been a significant amount of progress made on liberalizing LGBTQ laws and reversing the legal homophobia and transphobia of the previous colonial era.

=== Ancient ===
One of the earliest references to homosexuality to come out of the island was through the Pali Cannon in 29 B.C, and was later translated into Chinese by the 4th century A.D. The redacted version that is widely used now was written in the 6th century A.D. According to the Australian Humanities Review, the Pali Canon contains examples of male homosexuality. The Pali Canon does indeed discuss a wide range of homosexuality, but unlike modern western cultural views, it also sometimes conflates homosexuality with cross-dressing and transsexuality. It lists numerous homosexual acts alongside heterosexual acts as prohibited for those that are part of the Sangha (monks) though makes a notable exception for masturbation and states it is not a punishable offence.

The 5th century monk Buddhaghosa, a student of the Great Monastery (Mahāvihāra) at Anurādhapura, Sri Lanka, one of the most prestigious institutions of education in the Asia-Pacific at the time, attempted to explain what pandakas (a board term used to refer to homosexuals and third gendered people) was in his scriptures to Buddhist lay people.

The Upāsakajanalankara, a guide for lay people written in the 14th century of the Christian calendar, discusses sexual misconduct in depth but makes no mention of homosexual sex.

The Tripitaka does, however, contain passing references to homosexuality and transsexuality. For example, homosexuality is found in the case of a monk, called Wakkali, who became a monk because he was so attracted to how handsome Buddha was. There is also a case where a novice monk masturbated to a high ordained monk.

There is widespread evidence of same-sex cohabitation in the Kandyan kingdom (15th century to 19th century) due to tolerance of Ekageikama, though it is argued that this is not of a homosexual nature. The Sinhalese generally did not take marriage seriously, and cohabitation was widespread with marriage being considered a by-product of successful cohabitation. Unmarried cohabitation became a punishable offence from the Dutch colonial period in 1580.

Buddhism in Sri Lanka mostly focuses on sex on a non-discriminatory basis. It holds the view that sex is 'dirty' or 'immoral' and this is reflected in modern-day discussion about sex, including discussion on same-sex relations. The monastic rules state that monks should be celibate, but note that these rules do not extend to the lay people.

Ground Views shares the opinion that Sri Lanka without colonial influences would have probably held a similar culture to that of Thailand.

=== Colonial era ===
With the colonial expansion of European empires to the island, also came missionaries from the European church.

An observer in the 16th century, most likely a priest from the European church of ethnic European descent, claimed that “The sin of sodomy is so prevalent… that it makes us very afraid to live there. And if one of the principle men of the kingdom is questioned about if they are not ashamed to do such a thing as ugly and dirty, to this they respond that they do everything that they see the king doing, because that is the custom among them.”.

Englishman John Knox, who by this time had lived in the country for twenty years and spoke fluent Sinhala, wrote about the King of Kandy; “Most of his Attendants are Boyes, and Young Men, that are well favoured, and of good Parentage. For the supplying himself with these, he gives order to his Dissava’s or Governors of the countreys to pick and choose out Boyes, that are comely and of good Descent, and send them to the Court. These boyes go bare-headed with long hair hanging down their backs. Not that he is guilty of Sodomy, nor did I ever hear the Sin so much as mentioned among them.” It should, however, be noted that accusing someone of homosexuality would be degrading their character.

=== Modern ===
The ethnic conflict on the island is often cited as a major reason why legal rights for sexual minorities did not progress with the same speed as other countries.

Regardless of their sexuality, it is expected of the men to marry in adulthood.

The European Union has recently proposed to use its elevated trade deal negotiations to ensure that human rights on the island would be protected.

In November 2016, Sri Lanka voted against a plan to get rid of the UN Independent Expert on violence and discrimination based on sexual orientation and gender identity at the United Nations General Assembly. The push to get rid of the UN expert failed 84–77. Sri Lanka along with Kiribati were the only two countries, where homosexuality is still criminalised, who voted against the proposal.

The conservative government later announced that the Constitution of Sri Lanka bans discrimination based on sexual orientation. It also updated its human rights action plan to advance further rights for LGBT. It was consequently followed by an announcement from the Supreme Court of Sri Lanka that it would not be able to enforce the criminal law Section 365A if a case was brought before it.

In January 2017, cabinet members of the Sri Lankan government rejected the chance to legalize homosexuality. But in November, Deputy Solicitor General Nerin Pulle stated that the government would move to decriminalize same-sex sexual activity.

== Cohabitation ==
Homosexual cohabitation is not legally protected in Sri Lanka. The lack of recognition means that those in a homosexual cohabiting situation may not receive several benefits and protections that are otherwise afforded to heterosexual cohabitating couples, including domestic violence rights and adoption rights.

The tourism industry in Sri Lanka caters for gay wedding ceremonies aimed at tourists, although this is still legally not recognised by the government, and exposure remains limited.

Andi Fein argued that prohibitions against homosexual marriage in Chinese Buddhism stem from Confucianism, and that studies of Buddhism and Hinduism in India and Sri Lanka show no such prohibitions existed there.

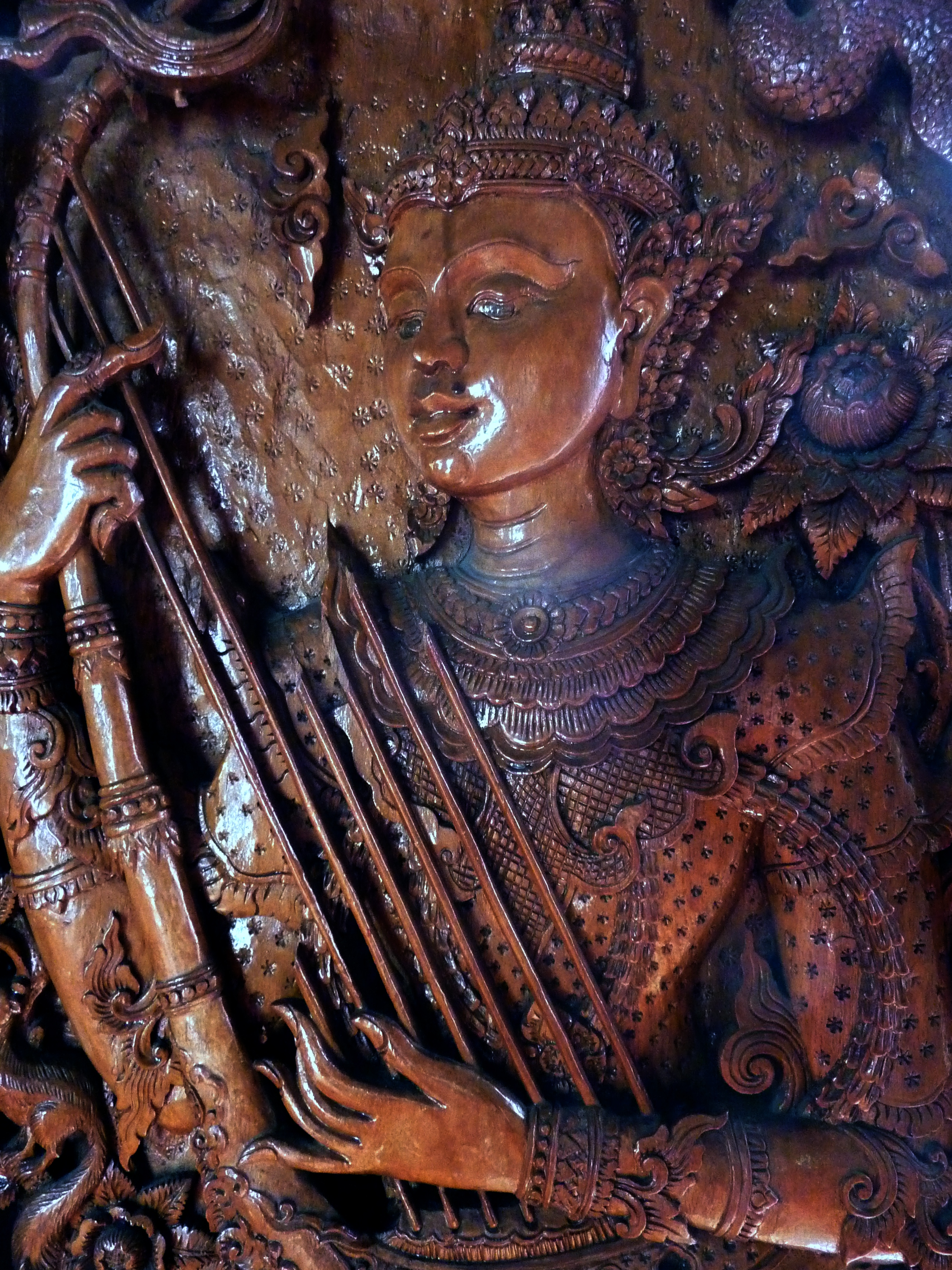
Wood carving of a gandharva, Thailand

There is widespread evidence of same-sex cohabitation in the Kandyan kingdom (15th century to 19th century) due to tolerance of Ekageikama, though it is argued that this is not of a homosexual nature. The Sinhalese generally did not take marriage seriously, and cohabitation was widespread with marriage being considered a by-product of successful cohabitation. Unmarried cohabitation became a punishable offence from the Dutch colonial period in 1580.

In Hinduism a marriage based on love is called a gandharva marriage. A Gandharva is a celestial being whose males are divine performers such as musicians and singers, and the females are divine dancers; Lanka Gandharva Sabha is the name of the organisation that wrote the national anthem of Sri Lanka. Due to cultural values in western societies that ascribe the personality of the male gandharva as "feminine", some commentators have introduced the concept into LGBTQ circles, though there is no inclination that these were viewed as homosexual at the time. Gandharvas are also part of the creation myth of Lanka. And their residence has been mentioned as being in Lanka, although references to numerous parts of India can be found in Hindu literature.

In 2023, a report reveals the majority of 69% of population opposed same-sex marriage's legalization, with a 60% strongly opposed it. The Government of Sri Lanka has voiced support for the decriminalisation of homosexual intercourse, but fell short of supporting homosexual marriage.

In 2024, the Supreme Court of Sri Lanka blocked the Gender Equality Bill, which had been passed by parliament, on the basis that it was unconstitutional due to allowing the possibility of same-sex marriage and liberal attitudes towards gender identity choice. The president also referred to the more progressive moves made in previous years, questioning the logic of the Supreme Court. Lawyers working with the government stated that a late filing by the government's team meant that the appellants won by default based on the one-sided argument presented, and there have been calls for the bill to be sent to the Court again to be reassessed.

== Culture ==
There are a number of establishments aimed at homosexual men found in the greater Colombo region, notably in the Mount Lavinia area, home to the annual gay pride, and the city of Negombo, a former Dutch colony on the outskirts of Colombo, with few other establishments scattered across the island. A lot of the heterosexual establishments court homosexual customers and will fly the rainbow flag on gay pride day. It is reported that homosexual sex remains commonplace between younger men. It is furthermore also widely reported that homosexual abuse of young children is also a problem among religious institutions.

Equal Ground reported that the media had become far more positive towards homosexuals since 2016, in both English and Sinhalese, rather than the more hostile media climate that much of the media participated in prior to this date; one of the most typical themes in Sri Lanka media was the association between homosexuality and pedophilia. A number of movies and literature works exist that discuss homosexuality though it still remains a small niche.

The Internet is the primary tool of communication for gays, with yahoo.com, gaydar.com, and gay.com being quite popular. 91% of gay men had lost their virginity by the age of 17. Facebook is also used to organise parties. 21% of LGBT in Sri Lanka reported that they were currently in a homosexual relationship with another male. Around 43% of sexual minorities in Sri Lanka report 'high life satisfaction' as opposed to 24% in Pakistan and 34% in India. 64% of LGBT polled were single and not in a relationship. At least 51% of LGBT were out to family, a number that is higher than the number out to friends and to their workplace. Around 46% stated that they share LGBTQ content openly on their social media profiles, with only 22% stating that they would never share such content on their own profiles.

=== Terminology ===
Ekalingika Samsarga - Same-gender sex (homosexuality)

Tritiya Prakriti - Third Nature (n.b. does not equate to the third gender)

Galkapanava - Male homosexual sex (literally 'rock breaking)

As with much of Non-Muslim Asia, intercrural sex has been historically more associated with homosexuality than anal sex, and is basically consisting of rubbing the penis between the thighs or the buttocks or on the abdomen.

=== Dating and friendship preferences ===
An informal survey found that the majority of sexual minorities in Sri Lanka found Westerners sexually desirable, finding them more 'sensual and sexually adept' than the locals; only around a quarter had had sex with a Westerner. None of those surveys had issues with dating someone from the opposite ethnolinguistic group, either Tamil or Sinhalese, but apart from one person, the majority expressed dislike for Muslims (including Moors) and did not like them as friends or sexual partners.

There is a preference for youth among the community, though social respect for the elderly can mean older people are also able to find sex.

A survey found that the locals considered their own ethnicities "to be the most beautiful men in the world" placing them above westerners, the latter who were viewed as more 'sensual and sexually adept' than the locals.

== Social issues ==
=== Sexual violence ===
Sri Lankan law does not recognize same-sex male rape according to a report published by the human rights organization at UCLA, and the UN has stated that Sri Lankan men are as likely as women to be the victim of rape. The majority of these reported rapes occur during detention by government forces, but it is also suggested that other non-governmental groups also engaged in sexual violence, and there are also no established channels for victims to report their rapes without fear of retribution or shame. According to the report by UCLA, "Despite evidence suggesting that sexual abuse of boys is common in the context of sex tourism, schools, care homes, religious establishments and other similar settings in Sri Lanka, and that male-on-male sexual violence outside such settings is also not uncommon, there is unwillingness to acknowledge the problem or the enormous shame and stigma associated with it, and a tendency to ignore or ridicule complainants."

It also wrote that a "2013 study by CARE International Sri Lanka on intimate partner violence and gender-based violence in four districts found that of the 1,658 male respondents in the study, 28 per cent reported that they had experienced sexual abuse during childhood. Additionally, 12.1 per cent of male participants reported having perpetrated sexual violence on men in the context of their membership in gangs... The CARE International study also found that sexual abuse of boys occurred in schools and universities in the context of “ragging” (verbal, physical or emotional abuse of newcomers to education institutions), and that three per cent of male respondents reported having been forced to have “sex or physical relations” with a community leader or schoolboy before the age of 18 years."

An issue remains with social stigma, as one activist put it; “Male survivors who share their experiences, experience stigma, ostracism, and a loss of social standing even among their closest and most sympathetic friends, and are re-victimised and further traumatised as a result of opening up about their experience and attempting to seek justice.”

=== Discrimination ===
Gay men feel unable to openly complain about discrimination due to the social stigma attached to being homosexual, and this reflects the wider problem of homophobia on the island. Since the colonial period, lesbian, gay, bisexual, and transgender rights have remained static, and homosexuality is outlawed in Sri Lanka. As a result, there is no act of ‘coming out of the closet’ in Sri Lanka. Although male-to-male sexual contact has been shown to be frequent, with over two-thirds of males reporting having participated in this kind of sexual behaviour at some point in their lives, almost all gay men attempt to lead normal heterosexual lives due to constant pressure from society and the inability of most in society to understand the scientific explanation of homosexuality. Most people in society consider homosexuality to be a mental disorder that should be treated. As a result, because the majority of people in Sri Lanka think this is weird or unnatural, gay people are discriminated against every day.

=== Media ===
Throughout Sri Lanka's new millennium, LGBTIQ organizations have encountered roadblocks as a result of ethno-nationalist politics and government-backed, homophobic reportage in the news media. The media's perception and portrayal of gay men in Sri Lanka heavily influence public opinion. The media's coverage of homosexuality in Sri Lanka has mostly been negative, with a few exceptions.

Bollywood cinema, which is immensely popular in Sri Lanka, is well known for portraying homosexuality in a bad light on a majority of occasions. Sri Lankans' creative expression may also be influenced by this. This has resulted in many Sri Lankan movies and teledramas including gay men simply as comic elements in their work. Aside from political, legal, and communal initiatives, various films on homosexuality and transgender identity have been created in the twenty-first century, which examine LGBTIQ topics from a cinematic perspective, among other things. The film 'Flying with One Wing' (2003) depicts the reality of homosexuality in heteronormative Sri Lankan culture, while the film 'Maya' (2016) examines the stigmatisation, stereotypical character, and prejudice towards transgender individuals in Sri Lankan society. "Frangipani," directed by Visakesa Chandrasekaram which is also known as "Sayapethi Kusuma" in the local tongue, is a 2013 film that portrays homosexuality as a humanized problem.

=== Verbal abuse ===
There are a variety of terms used in Sri Lanka to verbally abuse gays; they are based either on their femininity or sexuality. These terms are used with particular intent to directly address gays or to question the heterosexuality or manliness of straight men. One of the most common words is "ponnaya." It is slang for transvestites, very effeminate guys, or males who are weak in their interactions with women. "Ponnaya" is also used to indicate that feminized gays who call themselves nachchi are unable to sexually function like "real" men, which is considered disrespectful to both their gender and sexual identity by nachchi. Apart from "ponsi", "samanalaya" (butterfly), and "nangi-malli" (translated to sister-like-brother) are some of the other Sinhala terms used to degrade and discriminate against gay men in Sri Lanka.

=== Suicide ===
Constant violence, discrimination, and alienation result in most gay men in Sri Lanka having suicidal tendencies. According to studies, suicidal thoughts have been shown to be greater among sexual minorities in various Asian nations than in heterosexuals. This occurs against a backdrop of alienation related to society's limited tolerance of social diversity and the perceived burdens felt by these minority groups as a result of their sexual identity. There have been no publications on the psychiatric morbidity of Sri Lankan lgbt individuals in the last decade. Nevertheless, according to the World Health Organization, Sri Lanka had the world's highest age-standardized suicide rate in 2015, with 34.6 suicides per 100,000 people in the population, the highest rate in the world. An unusually high number of suicides and acts of self-harm arise in the setting of interpersonal confrontations and family disagreements. These usually happen on their own and are caused by anger, shame, frustration, and a desire to fight back against what they think is unfair treatment.

Given the societal prejudice that gay people endure in Sri Lanka, it is extremely probable that they face a greater degree of psychological distress and suicidal tendencies. These are infrequently documented in the media as experiences of sexual orientation-related harassment and suicide ideation, as well as being coerced into heterosexual marriages. Furthermore, homophobia is widespread, and families may disavow and expel gays, leading to greater estrangement from society, and they may commit suicide as a result of terrible anguish. The disease paradigm of homosexuality has been abandoned for decades. In Sri Lanka, however, it is not unusual to see parents requesting mental therapy for their children's gay inclination.

== See also ==
- Lesbianism in Sri Lanka
- LGBTQ people in Sri Lanka
- Tamil sexual minorities
