= Sherman de Rose =

Sri Lankan LGBT activist

Sherman de Rose is a Sri Lankan LGBT activist. He grew up in Kotahena. As a young person, he wanted to join the Catholic church and studied in Ireland, but he left the church after realizing he was gay. Then, he set up Companions on a Journey, Sri Lanka's first gay rights group, in 1994.

== Early life ==
Sherman de Rose grew up in Kotahena, a suburb of Colombo with six siblings. He was connected to the local Catholic St. Lucia's Cathedral and wanted to become a priest. At the age of 17, he went to the Poornawatte Seminary near Kandy and after a few months had the opportunity to study in Ireland. Between 1989 and 1992 he studied theology and philosophy.

== Career ==
Sherman de Rose set up Companions on a Journey in 1995, provoking a controversy since it was Sri Lanka's first gay rights group. He received death threats and was forced to go abroad for a time until things had settled down again.

De Rose helped to set up ACCESS (AIDS Coalition for Care, Education and Support Services), becoming its treasurer and convenor in 1997. In 1999, de Rose made a complaint about a letter to a newspaper which advocated violence against lesbians. The Sri Lanka Press Council refused to hear the complaint and fined de Rose 2100 rupees.

== See also ==
- Equal Ground
- Rosanna Flamer-Caldera
