= LGBTQ rights in Sri Lanka =

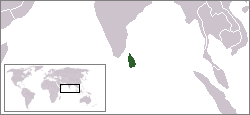
- Sri Lanka
- Legal status: Illegal since 1885 (as British Ceylon)
- Penalty: 10 years imprisonment and fines (Not enforced; ruled unenforceable by the Supreme Court)
- Gender identity: Legally permitted following medical vetting; surgical intervention not legally required
- Military: No
- Discrimination protections: Some protections based on sexual orientation

Family rights
- Recognition of relationships: No recognition of same-sex relationships
- Adoption: No

Article 365 of the Sri Lankan Penal Code, which dates from the time of colonial British Ceylon, criminalises sexual acts deemed "against the order of nature." Under the applicable legal framework, individuals found in violation of these specific provisions may be subject to a maximum sentence of ten years in prison, in addition to facing substantial monetary penalties as determined by the court. The Supreme Court of Sri Lanka has ruled favourably for decriminalisation and has agreed that any imposition of penalties are incompatible with the current times, but does not have the authority to invalidate laws, acts, or governmental actions. A bill aimed at decriminalisation was submitted to parliament in August 2022; however, no action has been taken regarding the topic since. Although Article 365 is officially described as dormant, police still receive complaints citing it. These complaints are often used to justify harassment or moral policing, especially against LGBTQ individuals in public or private settings. Advocacy groups report that police routinely ignore complaints from LGBTQ victims, especially when the incident involves sexual violence or blackmail. The presence of Article 365 is cited as a reason for this neglect.

Transgender people can legally change gender following medical approval and surgical intervention is not required. In 2016 the Government of Sri Lanka launched Gender Recognition Certificates and provided clear guidelines to medical workers on how to positively deal with the transgender community. Both major parties from across the political spectrum have generally expressed support for transsexuality.

Since 2022, there are some legal protections based on sexual orientation. The government has stated that discrimination based on sexuality and gender is implicitly banned under the existing constitution, and it has proposed to provide anti-discrimination laws as part of a wider constitutional overhaul currently under negotiation.

== Background ==
Sri Lanka did not have any legal restrictions for the general population against homosexuality until the colonial period. It had no legal influence from Zoroastrianism, Islam or Christianity, and most religious influence prior to colonialism came from Mainland India and East Asia.

The current legal framework of Sri Lanka mostly derives from European-Christian constructs as they stood during the colonial era, which were imported into the island. It is predominantly British law with some earlier colonial Roman-Dutch law. The most prominent of the discriminatory laws is the now seemingly dormant (sometimes reported as "decriminalised") under Section 365, that criminalizes homosexual sex. Further problems with the colonial legal framework include the lack of protections and supports for the sexual minority community, including the lack of specific wording fighting discrimination against sexual minorities nor the recognition of transgender and third gender concepts (who have been discriminated against through the Vagrants Ordinance). The Supreme Court and the various governments of Sri Lanka have countered this situation by including sexual minorities within generic anti-discrimination clauses and attempting to set dormant a variety of laws, although the colonial legal code does not provide the Supreme Court with the power to create or repeal law.

In 2015, the Supreme Court of Sri Lanka suspended (thereby overturning on appeal) a rare 2003 custodial sentence of a lower court, stating that the finding of guilt was correct due to the law remaining on the books, but that it would be inappropriate to impose a penalty on consensual sex. Human rights organizations and asylum seeker organizations have reported that police and government workers used the threat of arrest to assault, harass, and sexually and monetarily extort LGBTQIA individuals. However, several sources, including that by the IGLA president and Sri Lankan native Sherman de Rose, state that the laws are not used to jail and prosecute LGBTQIA individuals.

=== Dharmic moral codes ===
Sri Lankan Buddhism generally tolerated homosexual sex more than heterosexual sex, though preferred celibacy to even procreation unlike in western philosophical traditions. The Pali Canon explicitly mentions that sexual practices are generally forbidden in the monastic code (for monks), but sex of a homosexual nature would receive a lesser punishment to the point that certain types of homosexual sex would only require a confession and no punishment. This code was written on the island of Lanka in 29 B.C. and only limited to monks but not the general population. The ancient Chinese translations of the Āgama also does not challenge this. The lay man is only asked to avoid sex with certain classes of people (underage, married, monks, etc.). This is further supported by the omission of homosexuality in the list of sexual misconducts compiled in the 14th century Upāsakajanalankara, which was written in Sri Lanka in the 14th century and became influential again in the 17th century Kandyan kingdom.

== Political and community attitudes ==
Politicians from both sides of the political spectrum have expressed support for legal recognition of homosexuality and transsexuality, including the leaders of the two major parties.

Sri Lankan society generally has a tolerant view of homosexuality. There are even some traditions that promote transgender people, although the third gender seems to have disappeared from the island, despite having roots in Sri Lankan culture. As a result, these laws have been loosely enforced (if at all), and discrimination by police and others is often associated with corruption or attitudes towards sexual promiscuity, which also applies to heterosexuals. Some issues, including the status of sexual minorities within the military service, and intersex rights, have largely escaped both mainstream discussion and discussion by LGBTQ lobbies. Other laws that can negatively affect sexual minorities are more widely discussed in the LGBTQ people in Sri Lanka article.

In 1994, Sherman de Rose set up Companions on a Journey (CoJ), the first LGBTQ support group in Sri Lanka. The Women's Support Group split off from CoJ in 1999, forming a separate organisation for lesbian, bisexual and transgender women. Equal Ground was then set up as an LGBTQIA group.

The influential Buddhist chapter, Asgiriya Chapter, came out in support of extending rights to LGBTQ individuals, including support to amend the constitution.

In March 2021, in order to commemorate Zero Discrimination Day, the President of Sri Lanka Gotabaya Rajapaksa tweeted, "As the president of #lka I am determined to secure everybody's right to live life with dignity regardless of age, gender, sexuality, race, physical appearance, and beliefs." The Financial Times opined that this was the first public acknowledgement by the South Asian Head of State about everyone's right not to be discriminated on the basis of their sexuality or gender.

In August 2021, after a video of a homophobic counsellor caused controversy on the internet, the College of Psychiatrists clarified that modern medicine does not consider homosexuality to be an illness and further called for homosexuality to be decriminalized; unlike psychiatrists, counsellors are not regulated and do not require degrees.

In 2023, a report reveals the majority of 69% of population opposed same-sex unions' legalization, with a 60% strongly opposed it.

A poll by The Social Scientists Association in 2021 found that "72.5% of respondents believed that LGBT people should not be punished for their sexual identity, 65% said a LGBT person can do a job as well as any other person and 51.4% said they would support legislation to ensure the rights of LGBT people".

A survey by Equality Fund in 2018 found that 12% of Sri Lankan respondents were LGBTQI.

== Political parties ==
In Sri Lanka, parties from across the political spectrum have voiced support for LGBTQ rights.

=== Sri Lanka Freedom Party/Sri Lanka Podujana Peramuna ===
- In 2014, Sri Lanka’s Attorney General, appointed by president Mahinda Rajapaksa, declared that LGBTQ Sri Lankans are protected implicitly under the Constitution and that discrimination against them was unconstitutional.
- President Maithripala Sirisena appointed the island's first modern transgender governor Niluka Ekanayake in 2016.
- In 2021, president Gotabaya Rajapaksa expressed his support for LGBTQ rights in a tweet.
- SLPP MP Premnath C. Dolawaththa submitted a bill to decriminalise gay sex in 2022, which is currently being discussed in parliament.
- SLPP General Secretary Sagara Kariyawasam said that he was confident that there would be no opposition from the party's MPs to the decriminalisation of gay sex.

=== United National Party ===
- UNP MP Mangala Samaraweera was an openly gay politician who served as the Minister for Finance and the Minister for Foreign Affairs in the years from 2005 to 2019.
- President Ranil Wickremesinghe supported the bill to decriminialise gay sex.
- Additionally, President Ranil Wickremesinghe submitted two more bills to parliament in relation to LGBTQ rights: the Women's Empowerment Bill and the Gender Equality Bill.

=== Samagi Jana Balawegaya ===
- SJB General Secretary Ranjith Madduma Bandara said that “as a policy, our party believes that the LGBTQ+ community must be looked after.”

=== National People's Power ===
- In 2024, the NPP wrote in its manifesto that it will support LGBTQ rights and has stated that it will support the bill to decriminalise homosexuality.

=== Tamil National Alliance ===
- TNA MP M. A. Sumanthiran said that the party rarely discusses issues that are not related to the ethnic issues of Sri Lanka, but that he himself would support the decriminalisation of gay sex.

== Legality of same-sex sexual acts ==
Article 365 of the Sri Lankan Penal Code, which dates back to 1885 (while it was British Ceylon), criminalizes sexual acts deemed "against the order of nature". For much of the law's history, the prohibition applied to only to males; in 1995, Article 365 was amended to replace the word "males" with "persons" so that same-sex sexual activity between consenting adult females was also outlawed in addition to that between consenting adult males.

=== Ordinance to Provide a General Penal Code for Ceylon 1883 ===
Sections 365 and 365A of the Penal Code refer to unnatural offences and acts of gross indecency. In 1995, the section was amended slightly to expressly prohibit "gross indecency" no matter the gender of the participants.

==== Section 365 ====
Section 365 (Penal Code 1883) states:

Whoever voluntarily has carnal intercourse against the order of nature with any man, woman, or animal, shall be punished with imprisonment of either description for a term which may extend to ten years, and shall also be punished with fine and where the offence is committed by a person over eighteen years of age in respect of any person under sixteen years of age shall be punished with rigorous imprisonment for a term not less than ten years and not exceeding twenty years and with fine and shall also be ordered to pay compensation of an amount determined by court to the person in respect of whom the offence was committed for injuries caused to such person.

==== Section 365A ====
Section 365A (Penal Code 1883) states:

Any person who, in public or private, commits, or is a party to the commission of, or procures or attempts to procure the commission by any person of, any act of gross indecency with another person, shall be guilty of an offence, and shall be punished with imprisonment of either the description for a term which may extend to two years or with fine or with both and where the offence is committed by a person over eighteen years of age in respect of any person under sixteen years of age shall be punished with rigorous imprisonment for a term not less than ten years and not exceeding twenty years and with fine and shall also be ordered to pay compensation of an amount determined by court to the person in respect of whom the offence was committed for the injuries caused to such person.

==== Section 399 ====
This section is often used against transgender people for purported "gender impersonation". It has been used in situations where a person has converted to another gender yet bears a different gender on their documentation. The section provides: "a person is said to 'cheat by personation' if he cheats by pretending to be some other person, or by knowingly substituting one person for another, or representing that he or any other person is a person other than he or such other person really is."

=== Supreme Court ===
In a decision of Supreme Court of Sri Lanka, Luwihare, PC. J wrote in his opinion: "This offence deals with the offences of sodomy and buggery which were a part of the law in England and is based on public morality. The Sexual Offence Act repealed the sexual offences of gross indecency and buggery in 2004 and [is] not an offence in England now." Further, the opinion recognised that:

The contemporary thinking, that consensual sex between adults should not be policed by the state nor should it be grounds for criminalisation appears to have developed over the years and may be the rationale that led to repealing of the offence of gross indecency and buggery in England. [Emphasis in original.]

— Luwihare, PC. J, SC Appeal No.32/11 (2016), Supreme Court of Sri Lanka

The Constitution of Sri Lanka prohibits the Supreme Court from striking down Article 365A because the Constitution does not provide the Supreme Court with the power of judicial review. The second republican constitution was amended to state "all bills passed in parliament shall become law after it receives the Speaker's Certificate (79), it will be final and cannot be questioned in any court of law (80.3)".

All existing written law and unwritten law shall be valid and operative notwithstanding any inconsistency with the preceding provisions of this Chapter.

— Article 16 (1) of the constitution:

In 2017, the Supreme Court handed down a judgement that it would be inappropriate to impose custodial sentences on people who were accused of engaging in homosexual sex.

=== Government ===
Both the governments of presidents Mahinda Rajapaksa and Maithripala Sirisena have stated that "discrimination against LGBT people was unconstitutional and that the application of sections 365 and 365A in a manner that was discriminatory against LGBT persons was unconstitutional."

In November 2017, Deputy Solicitor General Nerin Pulle stated that the government would move to decriminalize same-sex sexual activity. The country's constitution does not provide the Supreme Court the powers to completely expel a law from the books. An attempt by the government to include its repeal into the human rights action plan was prevented by opposition from the United People's Freedom Alliance.

=== 1841 Vagrants Ordinance ===
This act criminalizes soliciting and acts of indecency in public places. Section 7 is used against sex workers and sexual minorities. A maximum term of six months and a fine of 100 rupees is imposed as punishment.

=== Proposed repeal of Article 365 ===
Premnath C. Dolawaththa of the nationalist Sri Lanka Podujana Peramuna submitted a Private Member Bill to Parliament on 23 August 2022 aiming to repeal the colonial-era law banning same-sex sexual activity. President Ranil Wickremesinghe stated "we are for it" and that his government would not oppose the private members bill, but stated that "[Dolawaththa would] have to get the support of individual members [for the bill to pass in parliament]. It’s a matter of their private conscience." In May 2023, the Supreme Court greenlit the bill.

== Recognition of same-sex relationships ==
Sri Lankan family law does not recognize same-sex marriages, same-sex civil unions, or provide equal rights to same-sex live-in couples.

The current marriage law was first implemented during colonial times for the purpose of regulating divorces, as in India, and is ultimately based on European law. Prior to colonialism, marriage was seen as a more informal affair where "living together" or "cohabitation" was the most common route leading to de facto marriage. Buddhism as a whole does not regulate marriage and attitudes towards marriage vary by culture.

The Catholic Church in Sri Lanka does not recognise same sex marriages in Sri Lanka, with the Cardinal Malcolm Ranjith stating that same-sex marriages "are not a human right".

== Discrimination protections ==
Since 2022, there are some explicit legal provisions that offer protections to LGBT people:

- The Personal Data Protection Act (2022) protects sexual orientation as a "special category of personal data."
- Section 34(4) of the Assistance to and Protection of Victims of Crime and Witnesses Act, No. 10 of 2023, states: "In determining the vulnerability of a victim of crime or witness, the following factors may also be considered: f) any other relevant matter including the racial, social and cultural background of the victim of crime or witness, the gender including transgender, sexual orientation, possibility of being subject to social marginalization, domestic or employment circumstances, religious or political beliefs, and any physical disability or impairment the victim of crime or witness suffers from."
- The Women Empowerment Act, No. 37 of 2024, states in its Section 2(d) that "The objects of this Act shall be to protect women from all forms of discrimination based on gender and sexual orientation."

=== Constitutional protections ===
The government of Sri Lanka claimed to the United Nations Human Rights Committee on 7–8 October 2014 that they think sexual minorities should be protected under existing generic anti-discrimination laws provided in the Constitution. The government of Sri Lanka stated that such protections were "'implicit' in the Sri Lankan constitution and that the government has not written a law giving 'explicit' rights yet".

Discrimination against sexual minorities remains a problem. Several lawyers and charities have called for specific wording in the constitution stating that discrimination against sexual minorities is illegal.

=== Law ===
While there is interest in creating non-discrimination laws and there have been at least two legal judgements favourable towards protections, none have been created or passed.

In 2017, the Government announced they would update their Human Rights Action Plan with an addendum that bans discrimination against anyone based on his or her sexual orientation. However, no laws were put in place following this statement.

Both the Nationalist government of Rajapaska and the Conservative government of Sirisena have stated "that discrimination against LGBT people was unconstitutional and that the application of sections 365 and 365A in a manner that was discriminatory against LGBT persons was unconstitutional." The Sri Lankan Supreme Court handed down a judgement in the case of Officer-in-Charge, Police Station, Maradana v Wimalasiri and Jeganathan, in which sections 365 and 365A were deemed unenforceable under the constitution. Despite this judgement and the government statements, the only parliamentary effort to repeal the laws criminalizing homosexual acts was not passed. As of 2022, no further attempts to repeal the laws have been put before Cabinet or introduced in the legislature.

==== Legal action challenging prejudicial police training ====
In November 2021, Equal Ground (a long-established LGBTQ rights advocacy organisation), with others, filed a petition at the Court of Appeal seeking a Writ of Prohibition against the training program for the police where "malicious, erroneous, and discriminatory remarks" were made about LGBTQ persons. The Court of Appeal decided on 8 December 2021, that this petition could proceed.

== Gender identity and expression ==
=== Recognition of gender identity ===
In Sri Lanka, transgender persons may change their legal gender. This has been allowed since 2016, following advice from the Human Rights Commission of Sri Lanka. The commission's advice elicited a directive to agencies from the Ministry of Health. The legal change requires bureaucratic certification which may be onerous to achieve; while typically requiring medical intervention and vetting before being permitted, the international legal charity, iProbono point out there is no legal requirement in Sri Lanka for any surgical intervention. This has been confirmed in a legal ruling.

According to a United Nations Development Programme (UNDP) report:

In Sri Lanka, the Human Rights Commission of Sri Lanka (HRCSL) facilitated dialogue on legal gender recognition in response to a March 2015 complaint from a transgender person. As a result, in 2016 the Ministry of Health issued a circular to health services and education institutions about issuing gender recognition certificates to transgender people. The Registrar-General instructed all registrars to change sex and name details on birth certificates based on such gender recognition certificates. The process remains a medicalized one, but with some degree of flexibility.

Although performed on occasion, gender-affirming surgery is relatively inaccessible within Sri Lanka, as many hospitals lack the highly specialised surgical units and staff. Human Rights Watch (HRW), in its "All Five Fingers are Not the Same" report (2016), interviewed doctors and patients. One physician who treats transgender individuals told HRW that Sri Lankan doctors were often unfamiliar with surgical treatments of transgender patients. Patients who had experienced gender-confirming treatments in Sri Lanka, reported that they could be met with ignorance, curiosity and even ridicule from medical staff. Some avoided public hospitals and clinics due such experiences, thus increasing the costs of treatments. Obtaining hormone therapy is similarly fraught. Such obstacles in the path of gender-confirmation increases the difficulty of obtaining any legal gender recognition. Besides providing a legal procedure for gender recognition, there is no other government recognition or assistance for transgender people.

=== Classification as mental illness ===
In Sri Lanka, gender dysphoria is classified as a mental health disorder or illness. Sexual and romantic orientations are not classified as mental illness by either the Sri Lanka College of Psychiatrists, or the College of Community Physicians. In addition, all medical practitioners in Sri Lanka are members professional colleges, and all Sri Lankan colleges are signatories to the WHO code of ethics—which deprecates any treatment of homosexuality as a disease or illness, on scientific and ethical grounds. However, despite this, doctors are often sought out by families to administer "treatment" to their LGBTQ members. There are sufficient doctors willing to perform such treatments that it is reported as a regular occurrence.

=== Third gender ===
The concept of third gender is not recognized under Sri Lankan law.

== Conversion therapy ==
In March 2022, a bill aimed at banning conversion therapy was tabled by Samagi Jana Balawegaya MP Rohini Kumari Wijerathna. Wijerathna criticized the government for not supporting the bill in July 2024.

== Blood donations ==
The National Blood Transfusion Service (NBTS) bans people who engage in risky behaviour from donating blood. It classifies male same-sex intercourse as a risky behavior, along with unrelated behaviours such as drug use and having more than one sexual partner. Consequently, men who engage in anal sex with men are banned from donating blood through the NBTS.

== Summary table ==
Legality of same-sex sexual activity	No Penalty: 10 years in prison and fines. Ruled unenforceable
Age of consent	No
Anti-discrimination laws	Yes Some limited explicit legal protections for sexual orientation
Same sex marriage	No
Recognition of same sex couples	No
Stepchild adoption by same-sex couples	No
Joint adoption by same-sex couples	No
LGBT people allowed to serve openly in the military	No
Right to change legal gender	Yes Legally permitted, but onerous process requiring medical intervention and vetting; bureaucratic
Recognition of third gender	No
Access to IVF for lesbians	No
Commercial surrogacy for gay male couples	No Illegal regardless of sexual orientation
Removal of same-sex sexual orientation as a mental illness	Yes Sexual and romantic orientations are not classified as a mental health disorder.
Removal of transgender identity or expression as a mental illness	No Gender dysphoria is classified as a mental health disorder.
Conversion therapy banned	No
MSMs allowed to donate blood	No

== See also ==
- Human rights in Sri Lanka
- LGBT rights in Asia
- Homosexuality in Sri Lanka
- LGBTQ people in Sri Lanka
- Tamil sexual minorities
