= Bhoomi Harendran =

Transgender activist in Sri Lanka

- භූමි හරේන්ද්‍රන්
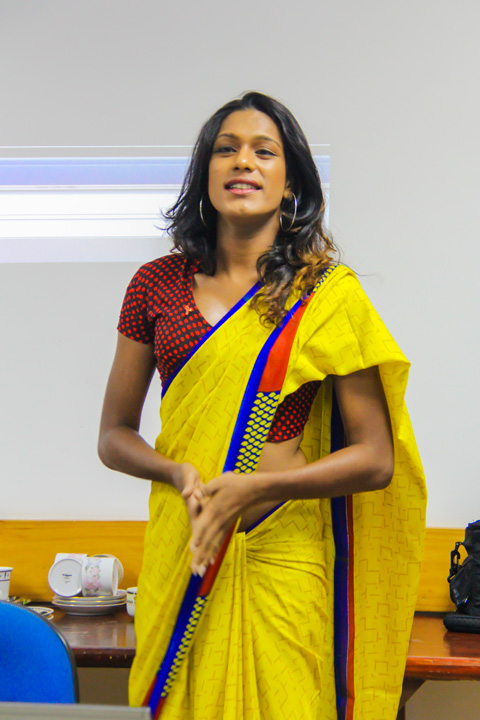
- Born: August 16, 1990 (age 35); Wanatha, Borella, Sri Lanka
- Education: D. S. Senanayake College
- Occupations: Transgender activist, Actress
- Organization: National Transgender Network
- Height: 181 cm (5 ft 11 in)
- Title: Executive Director at the National Transgender Network
- Awards: APCOM Hero Award (2021) SAARC Award for Best Actor (2017) 'Kusalatha Sammanaya' (Merit Award) (2018) at the Sarasavi Film Awards

Bhoomi Harendran (Sinhala: භූමි හරේන්ද්‍රන්; formerly Asmugodapathiranage Kumudu Darshana Kumara Sinhala: අස්මුගොඩපතිරණගේ කුමුදු දර්ශන කුමාර; born 16 August 1990) is a Sri Lankan transgender, actress, human rights activist and advocate for the lesbian, gay, bisexual, transgender, intersex, and queer (LGBTIQ+) community in Sri Lanka. She is the first openly transgender person in Sri Lanka.

== Career ==
Considered one of Sri Lanka's foremost human rights defenders for the LGBTIQ+ community, Harendran is the executive director of the National Transgender Network of Sri Lanka, a non-governmental organization dedicated to safeguarding human rights, health, and empowerment for transgender people across the island.

She pioneered in advocacy for the Gender Recognition Certificate (GRC), which led the Ministry of Health and the Registrar General's Department to issue circulars in 2016, which established a legal and administrative process for transgender individuals to officially change their gender and name on official documents. She also worked as an HIV/AIDS activist, focusing on prevention, sexual health, and rights within marginalized populations who are susceptible for sexually transmitted diseases. For her advocacy work, Harendran received the 2021 Transgender Hero Award from Asia Pacific Coalition on Male Sexual Health (APCOM).

She also served as a subcommittee member of the Human Rights Commission of Sri Lanka and has advocated for police reform, including the issuance of a 2022 Police Department circular providing guidelines on the appropriate treatment, searching, and detention of transgender individuals. She also serves as a Brand Ambassador for Emerge Lanka, an organization dedicated to empowering survivors of abuse.

== In film and television ==
Harendran is known for her role 'Shehan' in the film Frangipani (Sayapethi Kusuma) which made her the first transgender person to win the SAARC Award for Best Actor (2017), in addition to winning the Kusalatha Sammanaya (Merit Award) (2018) at the Sarasavi Film Awards.

Harendran has been featured in the Being Human documentary series launched by Daily Mirror, in partnership with the legal pro-bono organization iProbono, NTN's Pon Naha official music video also featuring Amelia Quincy/ Amanda Melani de Alwis, Ayodya Heenatigala, Buddhi Edirisinghe, GaaPink, Navoda Bennett and Vasisamudradevi, and Abhisheka Wimalaweera's hit single Bhoomiyata thawama pana thiyenawa.

In 2026, more than 10,000 movie critiques rated Harendran at 24% in 'Films.lk', ranking her the lowest ever for any actor or actress in the history of Sinhala Cinema Database.

== See also ==
- LGBTQ rights in Sri Lanka
