= Premnath C. Dolawaththa =

Sri Lankan politician

Hon. Premnath C. Dolawatte MP
- ප්‍රේම්නාත් දොලවත්ත பிரேம்நாத் டோலாவத்தா

Member of Parliament for Colombo District
- Incumbent
- Assumed office 20 August 2020

Personal details
- Party: Sri Lanka Podujana Peramuna
- Other political affiliations: Sri Lanka People's Freedom Alliance
- Education: D. S. Senanayake College

Premnath C. Dolawatte is a Sri Lankan politician, attorney-at-law, and a member of the Sri Lankan parliament from Colombo Electoral District as a member of the Sri Lanka Podujana Peramuna. He is an advocate of LGBTQ+ rights, having proposed a Private Members' Bill in 2022 to amend the article 365 and 365A of the Penal Code as a major step in decriminalizing homosexuality. He is also a popular actor.
