= D. S. Senanayake College =

- ඩී.ඇස්.සේනානායක විද්‍යාලයය டி.எஸ் சேனாநாயக்க கல்லூரி
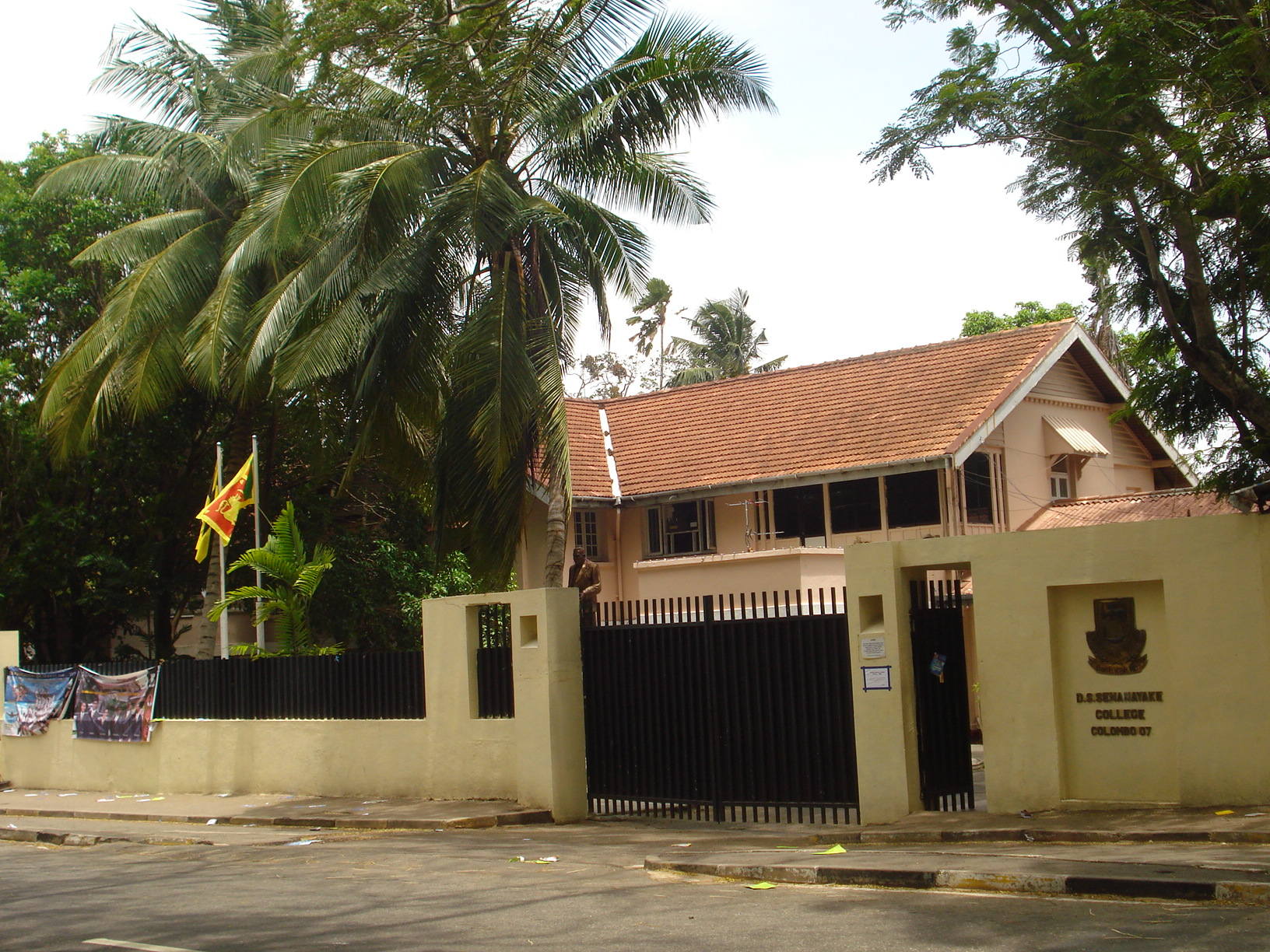
- Front entrance to the school

Location
- No 62, R. G. Senanayake Mawatha, Cinnamon Gardens; Colombo, Western Province, Western Province, 00700; Sri Lanka; 6°54′30″N 79°52′29″E

Information
- Other names: DS; DSSC
- School type: National school 1AB Government School
- Motto: Sinhala: තමාට පෙර රට (Country Before Self)
- Established: 10 February 1967
- School district: Colombo
- Principal: Sampath Weragoda
- Teaching staff: 284
- Grades: 1-13
- Gender: Male
- Age range: 6 -19
- Enrolment: 6000 - 8000
- Language: Sinhalese; Tamil; English
- Hours in school day: 07:30 - 13:30
- Houses: Shura; Meththa; Weera; Shantha
- Colours: Black and gold
- Song: "Sip Satha Sis Wetha"
- Newspaper: Siyapatha
- Website: dssenanayakecollege.lk

D. S. Senanayake College (Sinhala: ඩී.ඇස්.සේනානායක විද්‍යාලය; Tamil: டி.எஸ் சேனாநாயக்க கல்லூரி; also referred to as DS and DSSC) is a boys' primary and secondary national school in Cinnamon Gardens, Colombo, Western Province, Sri Lanka. It was established on 10 February 1967 with R. I. T. Alles as the founding principal, and was named after the first Prime Minister of Sri Lanka, D. S. Senanayake.

It provides education from Grades 1 to 13 in Sinhalese, Tamil and English languages. It was established on what was then known as Gregory Road but was renamed to R. G. Senanayake Mawatha in 2013.

== History ==
In 1965, the number of requests to admit children into the Royal College Primary had become excessive. Thus the Minister of Education I. M. R. A. Iriyagolla took the initiative to build a new school in Cinnamon Gardens on the lines of Royal College, Colombo. In 1967, Iriyagolla began the ground work for establishing the school. It was named after D. S. Senanayake, who was the first Prime Minister of Sri Lanka (then Ceylon) after gaining independence. R. I. T. Alles, an assistant principal at Royal College became the head teacher of the new school. The location where the college stands today was at that time called the Kumbikale jungle.

As a resolution the Ministry of Education had taken a decision to increase the number of primary schools, to meet the increasing demand of parents enrolling their children to Colombo schools. The secretary of the Ministry of Education and Cultural Affairs, M. J. Perera, was assigned to find a suitable plot of land to start the new school. Accordingly, the empty plot of land situated down the Gregory's road normally "Kubi Kelle" adjoining Kinsy road was selected for the purpose with another land bounded the said premises which belonged to the Ministry of Defense and also was acquired building plans were prepared and implemented by the state engineering co - operation.

Alles who had been an assistant teacher at Royal College had been appointed as the principal of D. S. Senanayake College. He was helped by the principal of Royal College, B. Premarathne. The cadet platoon of the Royal College also cleaned the land holding a shramadana. Five assistant teachers and office equipment were donated by the Royal College.

== Principals ==
Name	Tenure
R. I. T. Alles	1967 - 1982
P. Samarahnayake	1982 - 1984
S. M. A. Jiif. A. Mayadunne	1984 - 1989
R. I. T. Alles	1989 - 1992
Somabandhu Kodikara	1992 - 1995
G. C. Adikari	1995 - 1999
Asoka Senani Hewage	1999 - 2010
D. M. D. Dissanayake	2010 - 2016
R. M. M. Rathnayake	2016 - 2020
Prasanna Udumuhandiram	2020 - 2023
Sampath Weragoda	2023–present

== Hostel ==
The school has a hostel which provides accommodation to over 200 students. The hostel was opened in January 2003 by the Minister of Education, Karunasena Kodituwakku. The students were admitted to the hostel for the first time in February 2003.

== War memorial ==
Senanayakians were the first to establish a War Heroes’ Monument within the premises of a school. About 33 old Senanayakians sacrificed their lives during the civil war.

== Sports ==
=== Cricket ===
The Battle of the Golds is the annual cricket encounter between D. S. Senanayake College and Mahanama College. It began in 2007 and is played in three formats: three-day, one-day, and T20.

The ‘Bridges of Brotherhood’ is an annual 50-over encounter played with St. Anthony's College, Kandy, inaugurated in 2026.

=== Rugby ===
Rugby was introduced to college in 1974. The college currently competes in Division 1 of the Dialog Schools Rugby League. The school annually competes for the R. I. T. Alles Memorial Challenge Trophy rugby encounter with Zahira College and Alles Cup played with St. Anthony’s College

== Notable alumni ==
Name	Notability	Ref.
Asoka Abeygunawardana	electrical engineer, environmentalist and social activist	
Anuradha Dullewe Wijeyeratne	Sabaragamuwa Provincial Councillor (1988–1993), acting Diyawadana Nilame, Temple of the Tooth (1975–2005)	
Aravinda de Silva	international cricket player (1984–2003)	
Aloka Pathirana	Surgeon and academic	
Azath Salley	Governor of the Western Province (2019), Acting Mayor and Deputy Mayor of Colombo (2002-06), Leader of the National Unity Alliance (2017-Present)	
Asanka Shehan Semasinghe	Member of parliament – Anuradhapura Electoral District (2010–2024)	
Bhoomi Harendran	transgender actress, human rights activist	
Binura Fernando	international cricket player (2015–present)	
Damitha Thotawatta	Judge of the Court of Appeal (since 2024)	
Hashan Tillakaratne	international cricket player (1986–2004)	
Isuru Udana	international cricket player (2009–present)	
Jagath Gunawardena	Major General, Chief of Staff of Sri Lanka Army (2020–present)	
Kosala Kuruppuarachchi	international cricket player (1986–1987)	
Lahiru Perera	singer, musician, music producer	
Lahiru Mudalige	Presenter	
Naveed Nawaz	international cricket player (1998–2002)	
Prasanna Vithanage	filmmaker	
Priyanka Fernando	Major General, General Officer Commanding of the 58 Division (2020–present)	
Pubudu Dassanayake	international cricket player (1993–1994)	
Pulasthi Gunaratne	cricketer 2002 - 2003	
Premnath C. Dolawatte	Attorney-at-Law, Member of Parliament - Colombo (2020 - 2024), and LGBT+ rights advocate	
Tuan Nizam Muthaliff †	Colonel, former Commanding Officer of the 1st Battalion Military Intelligence Corps (2004–2005)	
Udaya Gammanpila	Member of parliament – Colombo Electoral District (2015–2024)	
Udara Rathnayake	Western Provincial Councillor (2014–present)	
