= Third gender in Sri Lanka =

Gender identification rights in Sri Lanka

The third gender in Sri Lanka is not as openly discussed as in other parts of South Asia. Though a strong tradition of transgender people exists in Sri Lanka, and even though these people have been allowed to convert for a long period, third gendered people have mostly avoided mainstream discussion on the island. Several reports state that the concept of a third gender is not found on the island, but binary concepts are found that are similar to the third gender.

== History ==
=== Hinduism ===
The concept of gender-changing is common within historic and ancient Hindu culture, and a distinction between biological sex and cultural gender is not made. Sri Lanka's third gender "hold an ancient association with a Hindu goddess of fertility to which they are said to sacrifice their own fertility for the sake of others. By becoming eunuchs, Hijras become semi-sacred, and can bless the health and fertility of newlyweds and newborns."

The Tamils of the Northern Province have a culture of cross-dressing, "so [a male] being feminine isn’t an entirely alien concept".

=== Buddhism ===
The term 'pandaka' can be used to trace the history of the third gender back to the awakening of the Buddha and the arrival of Buddhism to Sri Lanka over two millennia ago. Buddhaghosa, a monk in Anurādhapura, Sri Lanka, wrote about pandaka; they "are full of defiling passions (ussanakilesa); their lusts are unquenchable (avupasantaparilaha); and they are dominated by their libido (parilahavegabhibhuta) and the desire for lovers just like prostitutes (vesiya) and coarse young girls (thulakumarika)". He also stated that they are “whose sexual burning is assuaged by taking another man’s member in his mouth and being sprayed by semen” and usuya (“jealous”) pandakas as those “whose sexual burning is assuaged by watching other people having sex”.

The Pali Tipitaka, the form of Buddhism followed in Thailand and Sri Lanka, and the most complete transmission being held custodian in Sri Lanka, "mentions several different types of transgendered states and individuals – the man-like woman (vepurisikā), sexual indistinctness (sambhinna), one having the characteristics of both genders (ubhatovyañjanaka), etc.".

Peter Jackson of the Australian National University felt that the Pali Canon had significant influence on the third gender cultures of Sri Lanka and similar countries such as Thailand; "Never the less [sic], what makes accounts of sex and gender in these ancient Indian texts especially fascinating is their contemporary relevance in Thailand, which together with Sri Lanka, Burma, Laos and Cambodia forms part of the Asian cultural sphere in which Theravada Buddhism remains a vital cultural institution.".

== Culture ==
They are employed in a variety of job sectors, especially in "commercial sex work, beauty culture, Hospitality field, NGO sector and limited numbers in the government sector".

=== Etymology ===
The term 'nachchi' is widely used to refer to transgender people, while napunseka can be used to imply a third-gendered-centric view of transexuals. The term 'Hijra' can also refer to the third-gendered community on the island.

==== Pandaka ====
Tamil; peṇ ‘woman,’ peṇṭ u ‘woman, wife,’ peṇṭ an, pe ṇṭ akan, pe ṇṭ akam ‘hermaphrodite, eunuch,’ pe ṇṇ an ‘effeminate man,’ p ēṭ i ‘hermaphrodite’; Malayalam pe ṇ ‘a female, especially a female child, girl,’ pe ṇṇ an ‘effeminate’; Kannaḍa pe ṇ, pe ṇṇ u, pe ṇḍ a ‘female, woman,’ pe ṇ tana ‘state of being a female, feminine character or behaviour’; Telugu pe ṇṭ i ‘woman,’ p ēḍ i ‘eunuch’; etc.

— (cf. Burrow—Emeneau 1984:388, no. 4395)

The term 'pandaka' has two meaning in Indian languages. The first refers to 'eunuchs' and is of Tamil origin. The second refers to homosexual men and is academically considered to be a form of slang.

==== Nachchi ====
Nachchis are described as being a variety of people who do not conform to heterosexual male stereotypes. It was historically used to describe cross-dressers but now is mostly used to describe transgender people. It was originally developed as an insider term used by sex workers who could be conceptualised through western understandings as encompassing both transgender and homosexual individuals. "Nachchi," therefore, exists as a self proclaimed label of identity celebrating there "feminine gendered subjectivity," while simultaneously embracing key facets of their biological 'maleness,'" and passionately embraces their sexual desire for men.

However, larger society has weaponised the word as a slur against the very individuals who created it for themselves. A few organisations, such as the National Aids Council, describe the community as being "effeminate men who have sex with other men. They also operate as MSWs, and pick up clients from various cruising points. In addition to having clients, they often have regular male sex partners, with whom sexual activity takes place without financial transactions." It is debatable what this refers to however as there is no clear definition provided

Other organizations describe them as being a subculture of the transgender community, often as a substitute for terms such as third gender or Hijra.

==== Pons ====
While there is little information to be found on the word "Pons," it may be used as a shorthand for the slur "ponnaya," a Sinhalese word with multiple derogatory and offensive meanings aimed at queer and transgender individuals, particularly queer and trans men. The term can also be used more casually as an insult against men who are unsuccessful in their attempts to court, seduce, or generally interact with women. "Ponnaya" is also used in opposition to the queer and trans men who use the term "nachchi," as being labeled by the term ponnaya is not just an attack on your gender and sexual identity, but on their very ability to perform sexually. "Samanalaya" (butterfly), and "nangi-malli" (translated to sister-like-brother) are some of the other Sinhala terms used to degrade and discriminate against gay men in Sri Lanka.

==== Napunseka ====
A term found in Sinhalese that was historically used similarly to nachchi, but now either refers to eunuchs or hermaphrodites.

== Politics ==
The situation in the Constitution of Sri Lanka is the same as the one found in the Constitution of India concerning gender equality, though the Supreme Court of Sri Lanka lacks the powers to repel and create law in the same manner that the Supreme Court of India has.

Human Rights Watch stated that the third-gender people were not protected by the legal system of Sri Lanka. It called on the parliament to decriminalize being third gender by repelling three laws; Sections 365 and 365A of the Sri Lankan Penal Code, and the Vagrants’ Ordinance. It also recommended that the government pass comprehensive laws to fight discrimination.

LGBT rights activists have focused on improving conditions for transgender people who wish to convert to another binary gender, as opposed to the progression in Continental India, where the movement has focused on the third-gender community. There is apathy among sexual minorities on the island over third gendered rights because they feel it would slow down progression for other minority communities on the island who conform to binary gender.

=== Identification ===
The Commissioner of the Department of Registrations of Persons, under the UPFA, stated that they will be providing new ID with a new number for transgender persons.

== Social issues ==
=== Financial Issues ===
A significant section of the third-gender community is forced to do sex work or beg for money as a result of being rejected by their biological parents. A disproportionate number of the community lack formal education and are unable to find jobs.

A third gendered person explained, "It’s very hard, in reality. It’s quite alright for the posher Colombo 07 people; they can be doctors and lawyers and such. The poorer people have it harder and are often mistreated, which is why they leave their families or live a life of secrecy. It’s also really hard to find work thanks to societal perceptions, which again is why you get many trans people who are engaged in sex work or who are dancers,”.

Several transgender people complain about the high cost of undertaking conversion to their desired gender, in part because government-funded facilities are generally of poorer quality and a lack of trained staff exists on the island.

Chandrasena’s success enables her to get first-rate medical care. She started getting hair removal treatments in 2009; the facial laser treatment she undergoes every six months costs about 6,000 rupees ($45), Chandrasena says. She also spends about 39,000 rupees ($300) for each four-month supply of the estrogen injections she takes every other week. Those prices are average in Sri Lanka.

It has been thought that several transgender people are forced to work as sex workers in order to earn money for themselves, though they face the risk of being arrested because prostitution is illegal on the island.

Ranketh, a transgender man who asked that only his last name be used to protect his identity, says he spent years looking for doctors and psychiatrists to help him through his gender change, but at first he couldn’t find anyone to assist him.

=== Health ===
The third gendered community often face discrimination from health workers on the island, and can find it hard to change their gender even if legally entitled to.

=== Feminism ===
A complaint about the treatment of the third gender in Sri Lanka states that the gender disparity between men and women in employment shows how hard it is for the third gender to gain employment.

== See also ==
- Sexual Minorities in Sri Lanka
- Tamil Sexual Minorities
