= Gateway Group =

Educational conglomerate in Sri Lanka

- Company type: Limited
- Industry: Education
- Founded: 1986; 40 years ago
- Founder: R. I. T. Alles
- Headquarters: Colombo, Sri Lanka
- Products: Education, training and Communication & Information Technology,
- Divisions: Colombo; Kandy; Dehiwala-Mount Lavinia; Negombo; Ratmalana
- Website: www.gatewayworldwide.com

The Gateway Group is an educational conglomerate in Sri Lanka. Established in 1986 by R. I. T. Alles, former State Secretary of Education and Sri Lankan educator, the Gateway Group's subsidiaries include international schools, graduate education, and professional training throughout the country and abroad.

== Gateway Colleges ==
The Gateway Colleges are a chain of privately owned coeducational international schools for students from ages 2 to 18. The Gateway chain currently consists of 5 schools:

- Gateway College Colombo
- Gateway College Dehiwala
- Gateway College Kandy
- Gateway College Negombo
- Gateway College Ratmalana

=== Notable alumni ===
Isuri Wijesundara – Sri Lankan-American actress
