= Isuri Wijesundara =

Sri Lankan-American actress

Isuri Wijesundara is a Sri Lankan actress based in New York. She is known for her role as Sachini on the Apple TV+ series Little America.

== Early life ==
Wijesundara grew up in Colombo. She studied at Gateway College.

Wijesundara moved to the U.S. in 2014. She majored in theater at Adelphi University and completed a master's degree at David Geffen School of Drama at Yale University.

== Career ==
Wijesundara participated in a March 2019 performance of Target Margin Theater's Marjana and the Forty Thieves, an adaptation of One Thousand and One Nights. Abigail Weil of The Theatre Times wrote that Wijesundara "was simultaneously seductive and approachable, a real Scheherazade."

In December 2022, Wijesundara starred as Sachini in "The 9th Caller", an episode in the second season of the Apple TV+ series Little America. Craig Matheson of The Sydney Morning Herald described the episode as "an alternately bittersweet and blithe struggle for recognition in a Sri Lankan clan."

In 2023, Wijesundara was cast as one of the understudies for the New York transfer of Robert Icke's West End hit The Doctor at Park Avenue Armory, covering the roles of Junior, Sami and Flint. In July 2023, Wijesundara performed the role of Sami, opposite Olivier Award winner Juliet Stevenson during the run.

== Personal life ==
Wijesundara is fluent in Sinhala and English.
