= R. I. T. Alles =

Sri Lankan educationalist and politician

- Born: Ralph Ignatius Thomas Alles; 3 October 1932; Galle, British Ceylon
- Died: 28 November 2013 (aged 81)
- Education: St. Anthony's College, Kandy; St. Aloysius' College, Galle
- Occupation: Educationalist
- Known for: Founder of D. S. Senanayake College; Founder and former chairman of the Gateway Group
- Office: State Secretary for Ministry of Education
- Term: 1989-1993
- Spouse: Rohini Alles
- Children: 3

Ralph Ignatius Thomas Alles (3 October 1932 – 28 November 2013) was a Sri Lankan educationalist. He served as the State Secretary for Ministry of Education from 1989 to 1993, was the founding principal of D. S. Senanayake College Colombo 07, and was the founder of the Gateway Group and acted as its chairman until his death.

Alles was educated at St. Aloysius' College, Galle and later at St. Anthony's College.

He started his career as a teacher, eventually becoming an assistant principal at Royal College Colombo in Colombo, a leading public school in Sri Lanka, and helped to establish D. S. Senanayake College, Colombo. In 25 years at the school, he was a Director of Studies at Zahira College, Colombo in Sri Lanka. There after he established the Gateway International School.
