= Sunila Abeysekera =

Sri Lankan human rights campaigner

- Born: September 4, 1952; Sri Lanka
- Died: September 9, 2013 (aged 61)
- Occupations: Human rights activist, scholar, singer, cultural critic
- Organization: INFORM Human Rights Documentation Centre
- Known for: Women's rights activism, human rights documentation, feminist scholarship
- Notable work: Feminist film criticism, women’s human rights advocacy
- Children: 6 (adopted)
- Parents: Turin Abeysekera (mother); Charles Abeysekera (father)
- Awards: United Nations Human Rights Award (1999); Didi Nirmala Deshpande South Asian Peace and Justice Award (2013)

Sunila Abeysekera (September 4, 1952 – September 9, 2013) was a Sri Lankan human rights campaigner. She worked on women's rights in Sri Lanka and in the South Asia region for decades as an activist and scholar. Quitting a career as a singer, Abeysekera briefly joined the Janatha Vimukthi Peramuna and then founded the Women and Media Collective in 1984. As head of the INFORM Human Rights Documentation Centre, she monitored human rights violations by all parties in the civil war. She received the United Nations Human Rights Award in 1999 and the Didi Nirmala Deshpande South Asian Peace and Justice Award in 2013.

== Early life ==
Sunila was born on 4 September 1952, to Turin and Charles Abeysekera, a public servant and a leader of civil society in Sri Lanka. She first became involved in politics in the 1970s as a member of the Civil Rights Movement (CRM), which campaigned for political prisoners who had been involved in the 1971 Janatha Vimukthi Peramuna (JVP) youth insurrection. She briefly joined the JVP in 1978, editing their newspaper Red Power but left in 1980 after a disagreement. Sunila first began her political work with women through The Socialist Women’s Front, the women’s wing of the JVP.

== Career ==
=== Work in Film and Theater ===
Sunila developed a love for theater, film, song and art early in life. Her talent at singing was nurtured during her school days at Bishop’s College, and two of her songs, Udumbara Hinehenawa, from Dharmasena Pathiraja’s Bambaru Avith, and Hemin Sere Piya Vida from Dharmasiri Bandaranayaka’s Hansa Vilak, both sung with T. M. Jayaratne to music composed by Premasiri Khemadasa, are local favorites.

As a performer, Sunila’s career included roles in renown Sri Lankan plays and films, including Delovak Athara (Between Two Worlds) (1966) and Golu Hadawatha (The Silent Heart) (1968) by Lester James Peiris; Diriya Mawa (an adaptation of Mother Courage and her Children) (1972) and Makara (Dragon) (1973) by Henry Jayasena; Angara Ganga Gala Basi (Angara River Flows) (1980) and Modara Mola (1980) by Ranjith Dharmakeerthi; Paradige (On the Run) (1980) by Dharmasena Pathiraja; Amanthaya (The Dark End) (1997) by Nihal Fernando.

Sunila was also a cultural critic, and published reviews of local and international films, including in cinema journals such as Cinesith, 14 - Prakashanayata Avakashayak, Chitrapata. Women’s representation in media was a primary concern and framework of analysis for her. She penned the longest running feminist film review column on Sinhala cinema; a column titled ‘Ape Esin’ through our eyes) under the pen name Vishwapriya, in the Sinhala language magazine Eya published by Women and Media Collective. The column ran from the inaugural issue of Eya in 1995, until 2011.

=== Activism ===
Abeysekera co-founded the Women and Media Collective in Colombo in 1984, along with Kumudini Samuel and Dr. Sepali Kottegoda. The group promotes women's rights and has been involved with the National Women’s Charter, the National Action Plans for Women and the Migrant Rights Policy. In 2005, it helped draft the Domestic Violence Act. She became head of the INFORM Human Rights Documentation Centre in 1990, at a time when the events of the Sri Lankan Civil War were escalating. The group monitored human rights abuses on all sides of the conflict, being treated with suspicion by both the ruling government and the Liberation Tigers of Tamil Eelam (LTTE). This then resulted in death threats against Abeysekera personally and she was forced to spend some time in the Netherlands. She went back into exile between 2009 and 2010, supported by the Institute for Social Studies as part of their "Scholar At Risk". This is designed to help scholars threatened with violence in their own country.

In the 1990s, she participated in the executive committee of the Movement for Free and Fair Elections and became president of the Movement for Interracial Justice and Equality in Sri Lanka. From 1992 onwards, she worked with the Global Campaign for Women's Human Rights and attended the World Conference on Human Rights in Vienna (1993) and Fourth World Conference on Women in Beijing (1995). In 1994, Abeysekera took a Masters in Women and Development from the International Institute of Social Studies in the Hague, Netherlands, and won that year's award for the best research paper.

Her activism continued in the 2000s, when she formed an important role in setting up the international coalition of women human rights defenders. She focused upon the gender-specific aspects of violence experienced by female defenders and pushed the coalition to engage with other groups. In 2002, Abeysekera joined the feminist International Initiative on Justice for Muslim women who were victims during the 2002 Gujarat riots. She played an important role in ensuring that women's needs were addressed in the aftermath of the 2004 Indian Ocean earthquake and tsunami. Abeysekera also served as chair of the Urgent Action Fund for Women's Human Rights.

Alongside her activism, Abeysekera was a noted feminist scholar. She focused on the issue of mainstreaming women's human rights concerns within the international human rights system. The political participation of women and ending violence against women were two key areas of her work. She also worked with cultural workers and cultural groups to develop and create new ways of expressing themselves through the media and the arts, including work on critical cultural theory.

The major themes of Sunila Abeysekera's work include issues of equality and non-discrimination in understanding women's human rights and in promoting equal treatment for women; problems of re-conceptualising the nation-state and principles of good governance from a feminist perspective; problems of representation of women in art and culture; and feminist film criticism.

Abeysekera was a lesbian and single mother of six children, who she adopted from Tamil friends forced to flee the country. She died from cancer at the age of 61 on September 9, 2013. Her funeral was attended by thousands of people.

== Selected works ==
- "Women and the Media in Sri Lanka: The Decade from Nairobi to Beijing," in Facets of Change. (Sri Lanka: CENWOR, 1995). CENWOR - Centre for Women's Research
- "Women's Human Rights: Questions of Equality and Difference," (MA Thesis) (The Hague: Institute of Social Studies, 1994).
- "Women and sexuality : the city and the village; Sri Lanka". Cinemaya: The Asian film quarterly. 1996, Nr. 32 (Spring, April/June), pp. 8–13
- "Organising for Peace in the Midst of War: Experiences of Women in Sri Lanka," in From Basic Needs to Basic Rights. (ed.) M. Schuler. (Washington DC: Women, Law and Development International, 1995).
- "The Abortion Debate in Sri Lanka," in Reproductive Health Matters. (London: 1995).
- "Consolidating Our Gains at the World Conference on Women's Human Rights: A Personal Reflection." Canadian Women's Studies Journal 15 (Spring-Summer 1995).
- “Aragalaye Sthrihu” (Women in the Struggle). Women and Media Collective (Colombo: 1988)
- “Sthriya, Sthree Sirura, Cinemawa: sthrivadi vicharakshithayen baleemak” (Woman, Women’s Bodies, the Cinema: a feminist critique), Women and Media Collective (Colombo: 2013)
- “Women in Sri Lankan Cinema.” Framework: The Journal of Cinema and Media, no. 37 (1989): 49–58.
- “Sexuality: A Feminist Issue?” Women in Action (1:1999)
- "Voices of Women: Media Alternatives in Sri Lanka.” In K. Bhasin (Ed.), Women and Media: Analysis, Alternatives and Action pp. 89–91. (New Delhi : Isis International, Rome and Pacific and Asian Women’s Forum 1984)

== Awards and recognition ==
Sunila Abeysekera received the United Nations Human Rights Award from UN Secretary-General Kofi Annan in 1999. Human Rights Watch recognised her work with a Global Human Rights Defender Award in 2007. In 2013, she was given the inaugural Didi Nirmala Deshpande South Asian Peace and Justice Award.

== See also ==
- Rosanna Flamer-Caldera
- Kumari Jayawardena
