= Aloka Pathirana =

Sri Lankan surgeon and academic

Professor of Surgery Aloka Pathirana FRCS (RCS England & RCSEd), MBBS, MS
- Education: University of Colombo; D. S. Senanayake College
- Occupations: Doctor, Academic
- Title: Dean - University of Sri Jayewardenepura (Faculty of Medical Sciences); 17 November 2020
- Scientific career
- Fields: Surgery, Oncology
- Workplaces: University of Sri Jayewardenepura; Colombo South Teaching Hospital

Aloka Pathirana FRCS (RCS England & RCSEd), MBBS, MS, is a Sri Lankan surgeon, doctor, academic and Professor of Surgery. A specialist in cancer surgery, he has served as the Dean of the Faculty of Medical Sciences at the University of Sri Jayewardenepura since November 2020.

He is also a Consultant Surgeon at the Colombo South Teaching Hospital (Kalubowila Hospital). He was a former Secretary of The College of Surgeons of Sri Lanka in 2004, under Prof Mohan De Silva, who was the 22nd president.

== Early life and career ==
Pathirana attended D. S. Senanayake College for his primary and secondary education, and then entered the University of Colombo where he obtained his MBBS in 1990. Subsequently, in 1996 he joined a probationary lecturer for the University of Sri Jayewardenepura's Department of Surgery. Then he completed his Master's in Surgery at the University of Colombo in 1997. In 1998, he was granted the F.R.C.S. by the Royal College of Surgeons of England, RCS England & RCSEd (Edinburgh).

At the University of Sri Jayewardenepura, Pathirana was also appointed as a Chair Professor in July 2020. In June 2020 he assumed the position of Head of the Department of Surgery, carrying out administrative duties until he was appointed as Dean of the Faculty of Medical Science.

Pathirana is a member of the Sri Lanka Medical Council (SLMC). He is also a council member of the International Hepato-Pancreato-Biliary Association - Sri Lanka Chapter (SLHPBA).

He is a board of study member at Postgraduate Institute of Medicine, for Surgery and Clinical Oncology. He was a board member of the National Science Foundation, under the Ministry of Science, Technology and Research. He is a Member of the editorial board of the Ceylon Journal of Medical Science.

Academic offices
Preceded by	Dean of the University of Sri Jayewardenepura (Faculty of Medical Science); 2020-	Succeeded by Incumbent
