= Gordon Merrick =

American novelist

William Gordon Merrick (3 August 1916 – 27 March 1988) was a Broadway actor, wartime OSS field officer, best-selling author of gay-themed novels, and one of the first authors to write about homosexual themes for a mass audience.

== Early life ==
William Gordon Merrick was born in Bala Cynwyd, Pennsylvania, a suburb of Philadelphia. His father, Rodney King Merrick, was a manager of a truck company who eventually became a bank manager. His mother was the former Mary Cartwright Gordon (b. 26 July 1893, in Natchez, Mississippi). His only sibling was his older brother Samuel. Gordon and Samuel were great-grandsons of the Philadelphia philanthropist Samuel Vaughn Merrick (1801–1870).

Merrick enrolled in Princeton University in 1936, studied French literature, and was active in campus theater. He quit in the middle of his junior year and moved to New York City, where he became an actor, landing the role of Richard Stanley in George S. Kaufman and Moss Hart's The Man Who Came to Dinner. Merrick became Hart's lover for a time, but tired of the theater, with its endless nights playing the same role.

== Writing career ==
In 1941, Merrick quit Broadway to become a reporter. Exempt from the draft because of hearing problems, Merrick moved to Washington, D.C., where he got a job with the Washington Star. He later worked for the Baltimore Sun, before returning to New York City to write for the New York Post. His years as a reporter helped him to develop a love of writing as well as a writing style.

Eager to participate in World War II, Merrick got a job with the Office of Strategic Services, the forerunner to the Central Intelligence Agency. He was sent to Algeria as a counter-intelligence officer, rising to the civilian rank of captain. He was diverted to France and took up residence in Cannes. Because he spoke excellent French, the OSS gave him papers listing him as a French citizen. He was case officer for the double agent code-named "Forest".

=== First breakout ===
In August 1945, Merrick returned to the United States. He again sought work as a reporter, but did not find employment, so he went to Mexico and began writing novels. Merrick's first novel, The Strumpet Wind (1947), was successful in the United States. The somewhat autobiographical novel is about a gay American spy in France during World War II. Homosexual themes are minimized in the novel, which explores concepts of individual liberty and freedom. The spy's director is a dazzlingly handsome, but sadistic, bisexual. With the money he earned from his success, Merrick moved to France, and then to Greece, continuing writing. He published three further novels in the 1950s, but success eluded him.

=== Second breakout ===
In 1970, 10 years after moving to Hydra, Merrick published his second successful novel and his best-known book, The Lord Won't Mind. The story's protagonists, Charlie Mills and Peter Martin, both young, handsome, and well-endowed, fall madly in love. The book follows Charlie's path from a closeted gay man to a person who accepts himself. Charlie is terrified of rejection, especially that of his elitist, moralistic grandmother, whom he loves but who expects him to maintain an aristocratic lifestyle. She plots against all of his romantic relationships not only to keep him to herself, but in the belief that his blood is racially tainted. At first, Charlie attempts to live a double life, expressing his homosexuality through acting and painting, but he feels incomplete without Peter.

It is through Charlie's anguish that Merrick's interest in the problems gays face in establishing an identity becomes evident. Charlie's socially imposed resistance contrasts with Peter's childlike innocence. Charlie eventually throws Peter out and marries a woman to appease his controlling grandmother. Charlie's wife later suspects his homosexuality and perpetrates a horrific act of violence on her husband. As Charlie deals with the aftermath of the attack, he comes to realize that honesty and self-acceptance are the only ways to resolve his situation. Merrick presents this self-isolation as a necessary first step on the road to self-realization. At the end of the story, Charlie confesses his love for Peter, and they move in together.

The book appeared on the New York Times Best Seller List for 16 weeks in 1970. It became the first in a trilogy after Merrick wrote One for the Gods in 1971 and Forth into Light in 1974. The books have been criticized for the primal importance accorded to physical beauty and extremely large penises in the gay male world. A film version of the trilogy has been in development since 2004, and remains in pre-production as of 2018. Writer Renatus Töpke and later John Bernstein have written and revised several screenplays based on the books. Director and producer Sven J. Matten is seeking financing for the production.

=== Critical assessment ===
Merrick contributed book reviews and articles to The New Republic, Ikonos, and other periodicals. In all, he wrote 13 books. Merrick's works are rarely included in anthologies, and few discussions of American gay authors mention him.

Although Merrick's novels are often criticized for their focus on handsome, virile men, some critics defend this emphasis as authentic:

Beauty is a part of gay life, an important part – those men aren’t spending all those hours at the gym just for the cardiovascular benefits. This “obsession” has its roots in our core definition: We are gay because we find men beautiful. Beauty has its dangers, of course. That’s part of our complex response to it, and it is in fact this complexity that makes beauty a valid and vital subject for our literature.

Some dismiss Merrick because of his obvious romanticism; others do so because he sprinkles explicit scenes of gay sexual intercourse throughout each novel.

But underneath the handsome blonde studs with too much wealth falling in love on the Côte d'Azur, are fairly progressive and even radical conceptualizations of what it means to be gay, the likelihood of self-actualization, identity politics, and the role that power plays in relationships.

In his later works, Merrick rejected socially imposed roles and labels, insisting that each gay person question the assumptions underlying his life. Gordon Merrick broke new ground that has only recently become fertile. Deeper probing into Merrick's works will undoubtedly yield richer understandings of the complex social dynamics that construct networks of control over human sexuality.

== Personal life ==
In 1956, when Merrick was 40, he met Charles Gerard Hulse, who was working in Paris at the time – a 27-year-old American dancer and actor (b. 26 March 1929, Arkansas). Hulse became his lifetime companion. The following year, they began living together, but Hulse returned to the U.S. for four years to work as a dance instructor in Marin County, California. In 1960, Hulse returned to Paris to be with Merrick; the two remained together until Merrick's death.

Merrick died of lung cancer aged 71 in Colombo, Sri Lanka, on 27 March 1988. He was survived by his partner of 29 years, Charles G. Hulse, and his brother and nephews.

== Bibliography ==
- The Strumpet Wind. New York: William Morrow & Co., 1947. Reprinted in paperback as The Night and the Naked. New York: Popular Library, 1952.
- The Demon of Noon. New York: Julian Messner Inc., 1954. Reprinted in paperback as Lovers in Torment. New York: Popular Library, 1955.
- The Vallency Tradition. New York: Julian Messner Inc., 1955. Reprinted as Between Darkness and Day. London: R. Hale, 1957.
- The Hot Season. New York: William Morrow & Co., 1958. Reprinted as The Eye of One. London: R. Hale, 1959.
- The Lord Won't Mind. New York: Bernard Geis Associates, 1970. ISBN 1-55583-290-3
- One for the Gods. New York: Bernard Geis Associates, 1971. ISBN 0-380-00133-0
- Forth Into Light. New York: Avon Books, 1974. ISBN 0-380-01195-6
- An Idol for Others. New York: Avon Books, 1977. ISBN 0-380-00971-4
- The Quirk. New York: Avon Books, 1978. ISBN 0-380-38992-4
- Now Let's Talk About Music. New York: Avon Books, 1981. ISBN 0-380-77867-X
- Perfect Freedom. New York: Avon Books, 1982. ISBN 0-380-80127-2
- The Great Urge Downward. New York: Avon Books, 1984. ISBN 1-55583-296-2
- A Measure of Madness. New York: Warner Books, 1986. ISBN 0-446-30240-6
- The Good Life. Alyson Publications, 1997. ISBN 1-55583-298-9 (published posthumously; this manuscript was discovered in the papers of Charles G. Hulse, who co-authored the final work)
