= Article 365 of the Sri Lankan Penal Code =

Sri Lankan law against homosexual intercourse

Article 365 of the Sri Lankan Penal Code criminalizes "carnal intercourse against the order of nature" and provides for a penalty of up to ten years in prison.

The 135-year-old British law criminalizing homosexual acts remains on the books; however, the law is not used and remains a dormant law. The United States Department of Justice wrote that the police were "not actively arresting and prosecuting those who engaged in LGBT activity" and that the provisions have also reportedly not led to any convictions to date, despite "complaints citing the provisions of the law [being] received by the police".

The law, as it currently stands, has been described varyingly as decriminalized, dormant, and impotent, and it is widely considered to be unenforceable in the judicial system. The Supreme Court shared the view that, while the law did indeed discuss homosexual sex, consensual sexual relations did not warrant a custodial sentence.

Unlike in India or the United States, the Supreme Court of Sri Lanka does not have the power to amend law, it can only interpret law. Therefore, it is impossible that the Supreme Court could have repealed the law, though activists state that the Court should use their powers of interpretation more effectively to protect people who have homosexual sex.

It has been ruled unenforceable by the Supreme Court, and both the socialist government of Rajapaska and the conservative government of Sirisena have stated "that discrimination against LGBT people was unconstitutional and that the application of sections 365 and 365A in a manner that was discriminatory against LGBT persons was unconstitutional".

Although the law is not enforced, as fighting discrimination in the courts requires the sexual minority to openly state their homosexuality (and/or associate themselves with sexual minorities), police harassment is often not fought by the victims due to homophobia they may face in their personal lives as a result of outing themselves.

== Contents of Article 365 ==
=== Of Unnatural Offences and Grave Sexual Abuse [§17, 22 of 1995 ] ===
==== 365 ====
Whoever voluntarily has carnal intercourse against the order of nature with any man, woman, or animal, shall be punished with imprisonment of either description for a term which may extend to ten years, and shall also be punished with fine and where the offence is committed by a person over eighteen years of age in respect of any person under sixteen years of age shall be punished with rigorous imprisonment for a term not less than ten years and not exceeding twenty years and with fine and shall also be ordered to pay compensation of an amount determine d by court to the person in respect of whom the offence was committed for injuries caused to such person.

==== 365A ====
Any person who, in public or private, commits, or is a party to the commission of, or procures or attempts to procure the commission by any person of, any act of gross indecency with another person, shall be guilty of an offence, and shall be punished with imprisonment of either the description for a term which may extend to two years or with fine or with both and where the offence is committed by a person over eighteen years of age in respect of any person under sixteen years of age shall be punished with rigorous imprisonment for a term not less than ten years and not exceeding twenty years and with fine and shall also be ordered to pay compensation of an amount determined by court to the person in respect of whom the offence was committed for the injuries caused to such person.

== History ==
Article 365A of the Sri Lankan Penal Code dates back to the colonial penal code implemented during British Ceylon. The Penal Code of Sri Lanka was enacted in 1883 through Ordinance No. 2 of 1883. It only covered homosexual male sex but it was amended once in 1995 to expand the act to lesbians.

=== Penal Code Chapter XVI of Offences Affecting the Human Body of Unnatural Offences ===
The original text of the Penal Code of Ceylon, first established by the British Colonial government on the 1st January 1885, reads as the following text:

==== 365 ====
Whoever voluntarily has carnal intercourse against the order of nature with any man, woman, or animal, shall be punished with imprisonment of either description for a term which may extend to ten years, and shall also be liable to fine.

Explanation.— Penetration is sufficient to constitute the carnal intercourse necessary to the offence described in this section.

==== 365A ====
Any male person who, in public or private, commits, or is a party to the commission of, or procures or attempts to procure the commission by any male person of, any act of gross indecency with another male person, shall be guilty of an offence, and shall be punished with imprisonment of either description for a term which may extend to two years or with fine. or with both, and shall also be liable to be punished with whipping .

=== Penal Code (Amendment) Act (No. 22 of 1995) - Sect 18 ===
Constitutional Affairs Minister G. L. Peiris attempted to decriminalize homosexual sex in 1995. But during the debate, several lawmakers notified the parliament that homosexual relations between two women were not criminalized under the existing hundred-year-old colonial act, and consequently the section was reworded to expand the maximum twelve-year sentence to females.

==== Ordinance 18: Replacement of Section 365A of the Principal Enactment ====
18. section 365A of the principal enactment is hereby repealed and the following section substituted therefor :-

===== 365A =====
Any person who, in public or private, commits, or is a party to the commission of, or procures or attempts to procure the commission by any person, of any act of gross indecency with another person, shall be guilty of an offence, and shall be punished with imprisonment of either description, for a term which may extend to two years or with fine or with both and where the offence is committed by a person over eighteen years of age in respect of any person under sixteen years of age shall be punished with rigorous imprisonment for a term not less than ten years and not exceeding twenty years and with fine and shall also be ordered to pay compensation of an amount determined by court to the person in respect of whom the offence was committed for the injuries caused to such person.".

=== Supreme Court Judgements ===
The Constitution of Sri Lanka prohibits the Supreme Court from striking down Article 365A because the Constitution does not provide the Supreme Court with the power of judicial review. The second republican constitution was amended to state "all bills passed in parliament shall become law after it receives the Speaker's Certificate (79), it will be final and cannot be questioned in any court of law (80.3)".

All existing written law and unwritten law shall be valid and operative notwithstanding any inconsistency with the preceding provisions of this Chapter.

— Article 16 (1) of the constitution:

However, in 2017, the Supreme Court had made a pronouncement and established new case law by saying that it would be inappropriate to impose custodial sentences on people who were accused of engaging in homosexual sex, thereby de facto setting the law legally dormant.

Mr. Nerin Pulle said the Supreme Court has made a recent progressive pronouncement on Penal Code offences that may be applied to same sex sexual conduct. “In SC appeal 32/11, the court acknowledged “contemporary thinking that consensual sex between adults should not be policed by the State nor should it be grounds for criminalization.” While acknowledging that such offences are part of Sri Lanka’s criminal law, the court held that imposing custodial sentences would be inappropriate in cases where the impugned acts were between consenting adults,” he said.

— Lahiru Pothmulla, http://www.dailymirror.lk/article/SL-committed-to-non-discrimination-based-on-sexual-orientation-Nerin-Pulle-140616.html

== Political positions ==
=== Political parties ===
Both the socialist government of Rajapaska and the conservative government of Sirisena have stated " that discrimination against LGBT people was unconstitutional and that the application of sections 365 and 365A in a manner that was discriminatory against LGBT persons was unconstitutional".

==== UNP ====
In November 2017, Deputy Solicitor General Nerin Pulle stated that the government would move to decriminalize same-sex sexual activity.

==== UPFA ====
The party prevented the repel the law from taking place as part of its negotiations over human rights with the UNP.

== See also ==
- Section 377
- LGBTQ people in Sri Lanka
- Tamil LGBTQ people
