= Rosanna Flamer-Caldera =

Sri Lankan LGBTIQ activist

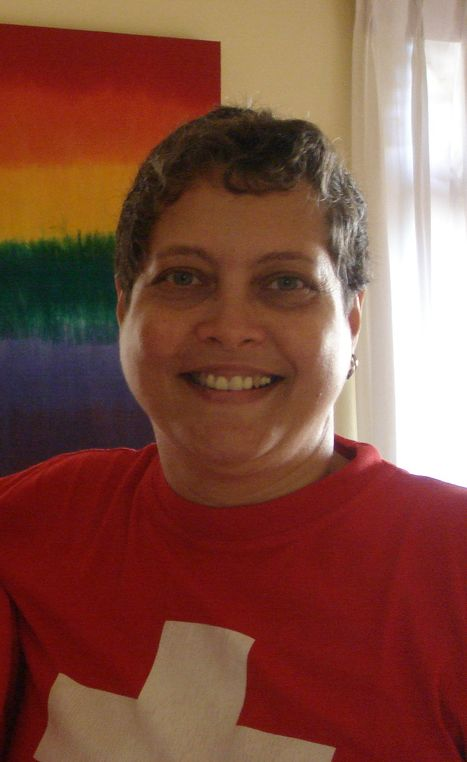
- Born: 16 March 1956 (age 70); Sri Lanka
- Occupation: LGBTIQ rights activist
- Awards: Time 100

Rosanna Flamer-Caldera is a Sri Lankan LGBTIQ rights activist. She is the founder and executive director of EQUAL GROUND (2004-to present), the oldest LGBTIQ advocacy organisation pursuing LGBTIQ rights as part of the larger Human Rights framework in Sri Lanka. She was also the co-founder of the Women’s Support Group (Sri Lanka) in 1999. Rosanna served as the first Sri Lankan Female Asia Representative (2001-2003) and then Co-Secretary General of the International Lesbian, Gay, Bisexual, Transgender and Intersex Association (ILGA) (2003-2008). She is the co-founder and former chair of the Commonwealth Equality Network (2015-2022), a broad network of LGBTIQ organisations within the Commonwealth. In September 2021, she spearheaded the first of its kind legal case in the Sri Lanka Court of Appeals, against homophobic, discriminatory and inflammatory speeches made by police trainers in Sri Lanka. The police issued an island wide circular to all police stations in the country that stated that LGBTIQ persons could not be arrested or harassed for being who they are. Through her guidance, in 2015 EQUAL GROUND commenced Diversity Equity and Inclusion programs within the corporate sector and to date has sensitised over 45000 staff members of over 50 companies in Sri Lanka. In 2017 she received the Zonta award for Social Impact and in November 2022, she received the APCOM Community Hero award for her work for the LGBTIQ community in Sri Lanka.

In March 2022, the Committee on the Elimination of Discrimination against Women found that laws criminalizing consensual same-sex activity between women are a human rights violation. This case, brought by Flamer-Caldera, was the first United Nations case to focus on lesbian and bisexual women.

In April 2024 she was listed among TIME magazine's 100 Most Influential People of 2024.

== Early life ==
Rosanna Flamer-Caldera was born in Sri Lanka on March 16, 1956, and is of Dutch Burgher descent. She grew up in Colombo, Sri Lanka.

In an interview with The Huffington Post, Flamer-Caldera said that after coming out she moved from Sri Lanka to San Francisco at the age of 18, and in 1978, she attended her first gay pride parade as a spectator, which was led by Harvey Milk. When she returned to Sri Lanka, she used many of the tactics she had observed in San Francisco such as candlelight vigils and demonstrations.

== Career and activism ==
During her time in the United States, Flamer-Caldera worked first as a contact lens technician and then as a travel agent. Later she owned her own Travel business named Falmer Ceylan Ltd for 15 years. Flamer-Caldera then returned to Sri Lanka to spend more time with her parents. She entered into a partnership with a top golfer and started a pro golf shop.

As well as working for LGBTQI rights, she is also an environmental activist, running a kid's environment club and other events for protection of wildlife and jungles (1990 - 1998). In 2001, Flamer-Caldera became the female Asian representative to the executive board of ILGA (the International Lesbian and Gay Association, which is now the International Lesbian, Gay, Bisexual, Trans and Intersex Association). She was then elected co-secretary general in 2003 and was re-elected at the Geneva world conference in 2006.

Flamer-Caldera founded EQUAL GROUND, an organization advocating for LGBTIQ rights in Sri Lanka in 2004. She was also a co-founder of the Sri Lankan LBT organization, the Women's Support Group, which was established in 1999 to provide support for lesbian, bisexual and transgender women. In addition she has contributed as an NGO Advisor for Berlin based Hirschfeld Eddy Foundation and the Global Fund for Women.

== Recognition ==
In 2005, Flamer-Caldera received the Utopia Award for LGBT rights activism, which is Asia's leading LGBTI human rights award. She was also voted the Toronto Pride’s International Grand Marshal for 2007 for her contribution to the promotion of global human rights.

In 2017 she received the Zonta award for Social Impact and in November 2022, she received the APCOM Community Hero award for her work for the LGBTIQ community in Sri Lanka.

In April 2024 she was listed among TIME magazine's 100 Most Influential People of 2024.
