= Equal Ground =

EQUAL GROUND
- Formation: 2004
- Founder: Rosanna Flamer-Caldera
- Type: Non-profit
- Purpose: Advocates for political and social rights for lesbian, gay, bisexual, transgender, intersex and queer people (LGBTIQ)
- Headquarters: Colombo, Sri Lanka
- Website: equal-ground.org

Equal Ground is a non-profit advocacy organization based in Colombo, Sri Lanka, that campaigns for political, social and civilian rights for lesbian, gay, bisexual, transgender, intersex and queer (LGBTIQ) individuals. The organization, established in 2004, is one of the first organization in Sri Lanka welcoming and advocating equality for people of all sexual orientations and gender identities.

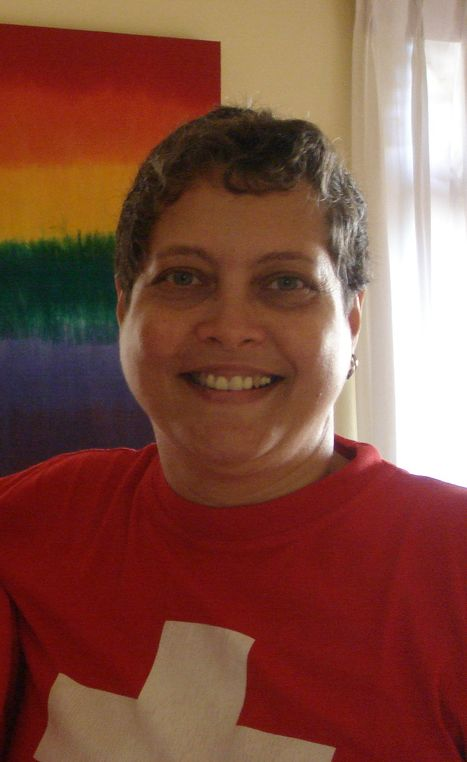
Rosanna Flamer-Caldera, LGBTQ activist from Sri Lanka

The organization was founded by Sri Lankan LGBTQ rights activist Rosanna Flamer-Caldera and offers trilingual publications and services. It aims to achieve its goals through political activism, education, personal support, building awareness and through organized community events. It has been working more closely with lesbian, bisexual and transgender women in areas of human rights, law reform, sexual health, and violence based on sexual orientation and gender identity.

== Notable works ==
- Equal Ground provided disaster relief to its community and others when the 2004 tsunami hit Sri Lanka leaving many deaths and homelessness.
- Colombo Pride is the only annual Pride celebration in Sri Lanka, and is organized by Equal Ground since 2005. The first ever event was attended by around 350 people. The newspaper Ceylon Today describes it as a week-long joyous celebration with a variety of events full of color, music and diversity.
- Equal Ground launched its first publication "Human, Right?" in 2005 to celebrate the International Day against Homophobia (IDAHOT). The publication located LGBTQ rights within the larger framework of human rights and appealed for the importance of LGBTQ rights as a part of human rights.
- Rainbow News, which is published quarterly by Equal Ground is the Sri Lanka's only LGBT publication.
- The annual South Asian Lesbian and Bisexual Women's Conference and Training was supported by Equal Ground in the years of 2010 and 2011.
- The organization launched its "I Might be Transgender: a booklet for transgender youth" at the 2014 IDAHOT conference that took place in Colombo, Sri Lanka. It also released the documentary "The Invisible Stain" at the same occasion.
- Equal Ground working in collaboration with the Kaleidoscope Australia Human Rights Foundation, a group that promotes equal rights for LGBT people in Asia Pacific region, submitted an alternative human rights report on "Sri Lanka's protection of the rights of LGBTI Persons" to the United Nations Human Rights Committee in September 2014.

== Achievements and recognition ==
Following Equal Ground and Kaleidoscope Australia's 2014 shadow report on LGBT rights in Sri Lanka that was submitted to the United Nations Humans Rights Committee, the government representatives from Sri Lanka admitted to the committee for the first time that the human rights of LGBT people were protected under the country's anti-discrimination laws. LGBT rights activists and the community widely welcomed this as a small change in the positive direction. In 2012 Women Deliver identified Equal Ground as one of the fifty most influential groups around the world that provides services to women. Women deliver appreciated and congratulated Equal Ground for its work towards leadership and empowerment of women.

== Progress and Challenges ==
Despite not being criminalized or tabooed in much of Sri Lanka's history, both non-heterosexual and non-cisgender individuals continue to face stigma, violence and discrimination in Sri Lankan society, and most organizations advocating for LGBT rights in Sri Lanka still face threats and staunch opposition. Queer groups in Sri Lanka have frequently stated that some of their members have been subjected to harassment—by blackmail or by threats with exposition or arrest—by police and other people, using the legal provision.

This is mainly because consensual same-sex sexual acts and intimacy are deemed to be unnatural and thus considered a criminal offense that can earn up to ten years of prison under Sri Lanka's current constitution. In the past decades, efforts of LGBTQ+ activists in the recent past to decriminalize sodomy laws implemented by British colonials was not repealed, but the law was expanded to include women and the penalty was worsened.

However, recent activity has seen a level of success, with the Supreme Court of Sri Lanka ruling the Section 365 & 365A of the Penal Code unenforceable by law in 2017, and the state announced in 2016 that transgender individuals were legally permitted to change to their preferred gender identity following medical approval. Subsequently, Gender Recognition Certificates were also launched by the government and clear guidelines to medical workers on how to positively deal with the transgender community were also provided.

In 2018, the Asgiriya Chapter, one of the most influential Buddhist chapters in Sri Lanka, came out extending open support towards LGBTQI+ individuals, and called for civilian equality, including the amendment of the constitution.

In a landmark decision in 2022, the United Nations sided with Flamer-Caldera in her case against Sri Lanka’s ban on same-sex intimacy between women, declaring it a human-rights violation, which brought the issue of LGBTQIA+ rights to the fore in Sri Lankan politics.

Soon after, in November 2021, Equal Ground along with other queer advocacy groups and lawmakers, filed a petition at the Court of Appeal seeking a Writ of Prohibition against a training programme for the police conducted by a popular counsellor named Ama Dissanayake, where she made "malicious, erroneous, and discriminatory remarks" about LGBTIQ persons. The Court of Appeal decided on 8 December 2021, that this petition could proceed.

The post-COVID 19 period and the subsequent socio-politico-economic crises and protest movements saw a resurgence of LGBTQ+ activism in Sri Lanka, with Colombo Pride, the only annual LGBT pride event in Sri Lanka, being held for the first time in June 2022, chiefly hosted by Equal Ground.

On 23 August 2022, Premnath C. Dolawatte, a lawmaker from the ruling nationalist party SLPP, submitted a Private Member Bill to Parliament on 23 August 2022 aiming to repeal and decriminalize the colonial-era sodomy laws banning same-sex sexual acts. Soon, Equal Ground and other queer rights organizations joined and supported the bill. In May 2023, the bill was green lit by the Supreme Court and is currently under negotiation within the parliament.

== See also ==
- Colombo Pride
- LGBT history in Sri Lanka
