= LGBTQ people in Sri Lanka =

LGBTQ people in Sri Lanka have been counted in recent times as consisting of as little as 0.035% of the population to as high as 19.6%. It is likely that there are around 1,100,000 according to current mapping conventions.

Article 365 of the Sri Lankan Penal Code, which criminalises same-sex sexual acts, remains on the books, though the law has not been enforced in recent times, and the Supreme Court has said it would not impose penalties over consensual homosexual sex. Premnath C. Dolawatte submitted a Private Member Bill to Parliament on the 23rd August 2022 aiming to repeal the colonial-era law banning homosexual sex, to which the current President of Sri Lanka said "we are for it" and his government would not oppose the private members bill, but that "you have to get the support of individual members [for the bill to pass in parliament]." It was later reported by media that the law is likely to be repealed in 2023 due to the cause gaining widespread consensus among said individual members of parliament.

Sri Lanka has also been voted the top emerging travel destination in Asia by the gay-friendly travel website Travel Lemming, and several native companies and establishments offer tours and services to homosexuals.

== History ==
The Sri Lankans views of homosexuality in ancient times can be pieced together from several archaeological pieces, including artworks, literary works and third hand accounts. There were no legal restrictions on homosexuality or transsexuality for the general population prior to early modern period and colonialism. However, dharmic moral codes forbade sexual misconduct (of both heterosexual and homosexual nature) among the upper class of priests and monks, and religious codes of foreign religions such as Christianity, Islam, Zoroastrianism forbade homosexuality among their followers. Sri Lanka did not have any legal restrictions on homosexuality until the colonial period.

Once a region of diverse religious views and sexual pluralism, the Indian Subcontinent yielded to complex conservatism coexisting with tolerance to sexual violence towards women and those marginalised.

— Lazeena Muna-McQuay, Bangkok Post

Hinduism and then Buddhism did not place negative stigmas on homosexuals and therefore there had been great acceptance of homosexuality in the island's ancient societies. The Hindu epic of Ramayana describes Hanuman witnessing two people engaged in "homosexual intimacy" on the island of Lanka.

The Pali Cannon was written by monks in Sri Lanka around 29 B.C. and describes examples of sexual misconduct for monks and persists (but not the lay people). It specifically states that any acts of "soft" homosexual sex (such as masturbation and interfumeral sex) do not entail a punishment but must be confessed to the monastery. The Pali Cannon is thought to be derived from the oral transmission of Buddha.

In the 14th century CE, Upāsakajanalankara did not list homosexuality as a crime in its list of sexual misconducts. The Mahawansa discusses an intimate relationship between King Kumaradasa and poet Kalidasa in the 5th century CE.

Most of his Attendants are Boys, and Young Men, that are well favoured, and of good Parentage. For the supplying himself with these, he gives the order to his Dissava’s or Governors of the countries to pick and choose out Boys, that are comely and of good Descent, and send them to the Court. These boys go bare-headed with long hair hanging down their backs.

— Robert Knox, An Historical Relation of the Island of Ceylon, 1681

The major source for homophobia in the country was when the British implemented the Indian Penal Code and applied Section 377A (now Section 365A of the Sri Lankan Penal Code) to the island.

On one hand, we are screaming about homosexuality being a Western import, when in fact it is the British laws that are a Western import, not homosexuality.

— Flamer-Caldera, NBC News

Many European colonial correspondence accounts of the island's 'sinful' acceptance of homosexuality was written by Portuguese and Dutch invaders, characterizing the island's leaders as being frightening for allowing the act of sodomy, and even accounting that the elite themselves partook gay sex. However during colonialism the island became a holiday destination for Europeans looking to escape the homophobia of their native country.

Sri Lanka could be described as having a mixed attitude towards homosexuality. Regardless of their sexuality, most men are expected to marry in adulthood.

In November 2016, Sri Lanka voted against a plan to get rid of the |UN Independent Expert on violence and discrimination based on sexual orientation and gender identity, Vitit Muntarbhorn, at the United Nations General Assembly. The push to get rid of the UN expert failed 84–77. Sri Lanka along with Kiribati were the only two countries where homosexuality is still criminalised, to vote against the proposal.

The conservative government later announced that the Government hopes to start working toward creating a law to ban discrimination based on sexual orientation. It also updated its human rights action plan to advance further rights for LGBT.

In mid-2020, a well-known establishment issued an apology after an employee was accused of homophobia after denying entry to an LGBTQ individual, with the bouncer involved being terminated, followed by enhanced training to fight homophobia. Commentary on the incident discussed how people in the country were not aggressive with their homophobia, it would be often discussed behind closed doors.

A survey in 2020 suggested that 74.3% had moderate to positive views about transgender people, whereas 62% had moderate to positive views on homosexuality. The least positive views were held by Hill Tamils and Sri Lankan Moors, but a majority of Sinhalese and Tamils had moderate to positive views on homosexuality. In 2023, the majority of 69% of the population opposed legalisation of same-sex unions, with a 60% strongly opposed it.

Being gay is totally fine. Even in Sri Lanka, you can be gay, as long as you marry a woman. I think this is horrible (girls I know have married gay guys in arranged marriages and it was predictably terrible and short-lived). What I mean is that being homosexual is fine even if it's not accepted by some cultures. Sexual harassment and assault are not fine in any abstraction.

— Indi Samarajiva, Colombo Telegraph

In November 2017, Deputy Solicitor General Nerin Pulle stated that the government would move to decriminalise same-sex sexual activity.

== Community attitudes ==
Sri Lanka's two dominant religions, Buddhism and Hinduism, do not condemn homosexuality. The former talks about homosexuals using positive descriptions, including tips on how to have better homosexual sex in the Kama Sutra, while the latter's view on 'sexual misconduct' can affect liberal sexual activity among both heterosexuals and homosexuals.

Equal Ground explained that a number of transsexuals and transgender people take refuge in the Buddhist order when disowned or pushed away by their families, such as by becoming a monk at a temple or monastery. The influential Buddhist chapter, Asgiri Maha Viharaya, came out in support of extending rights to LGBT, including support to amend the constitution.

Verité Research, talking in the Sunday Observer, found that the media of Sri Lanka tended to sensationalise stories involving sexual minorities. An LGBT rights activist further explained in the Observer that "Media plays an important role in helping the society to accept these communities. Tamil media stays ignorant to the subject, while Sinhala media are being pretentiously ignorant by sensationalising stories of the LGBT+ communities".

=== Hinduism ===
A homosexual union of love or lust may fall under "Gandharvavivaha" which refers to marriage on the basis of pure love and/or sexual relations (rather than with the blessing/arrangement of parents). A Gandharava marriage was the most common form of marriage for lay people described in classical Indian literature and was heavily associated with village life. A Gandharava was a low ranking male deity who had a symbolic association with fine and creative arts, specifically music, with strong connections to sexuality and procreation, and the term is etymologically linked to "fragrance", and these males are commonly pared with females called "Apsaras" who are associated with the arts, dancing and literature.

The Kama Sutra also explains the situation of "swarinis" who are described as lesbians who marry and take care for children.

There are punishments for homosexual sex listed in numerous texts used within contemporary Hinduism, though these punishments should be taken into context with the likewise numerous punishments listed for heterosexual sex also listed within numerous texts used within contemporary Hinduism. These punishments regardless of whether they are aimed are heterosexuality or homosexuality originally are not aimed at the lay people. There have been reports of Hindu gurus performing same-sex marriages in India since at least the 1980s.

=== Sinhalese viewpoints ===
Buddhism does not provide restrictions as to how people should be married, though customs have developed that specify heterosexual couples in many Buddhist countries including Sri Lanka. British Kandyan Law only states two types of marriage; a marriage where a man joins the woman's family, and a marriage where a woman joins the man's family.

However, the current traditions of the Sinhalese, the Poruwa ceremony, was introduced to the island prior to the arrival of Buddhism. Some aspects are very similar to current Tamil marriages, such as Nekath (referring to horoscopes).

==== Traditional wedding ceremonies ====
The River House in Sri Lanka offers a package (aimed at tourists) who want to conduct what is described as a "traditional wedding ceremony". It incorporates several elements of traditional weddings in Sinhalese culture such as poruwa and Kandyan dancers.

=== Tamil viewpoints ===
Hinduism is mostly devoid of the 'perfect law' that can be found in Abrahamic religions (such as the ten commandments) and traditionally Hindus would expect to "rely on reason to decide what is dharma and what is not 'dharma''. Combined with the lack of centralisation and authority, there is great diversity among Hindus as to how homosexual relationships should be institutionalised in Hindu society.

Tamils have conducted homosexual marriages under Hinduism in South Africa, Australia, and the United Kingdom.

==== Non-binary marriage ====
A long-running tradition concerning non-binary marriage exists in Hindu society for third genders, which may also add another perspective as to how homosexual relationships should be viewed in the modern age.

There are eight types of marriage commonly performed in India. Of these, Gandharva vivaha is the most common, and this does not restrict third gendered relationships from being blessed under the ritual.

The case for the institutionalisation of non-binary marriage is strong in Hindu society due to the strong prevalence of evidence dictating how third gendered marriages were conducted since ancient times.

==== Unique blessings and rites ====
Marriage comes in several incarnations in Hinduism and several Hindu organisations reject the idea of performing the same ceremonies for both heterosexual and homosexual (and third gendered) couples.

The Australian Council of Hindu Clergy, whose membership includes a significant portion of the Sri Lankan Tamil clergy, lists several types of marriage including those aimed at heterosexual couples and those that are not. It comes to the conclusion that homosexual couples should be provided with their own rites and blessings that are not the same as the rites provided to heterosexual marriage.

=== Police ===
The police introduced amendments in the police academic curriculum to reduce homophobia by the summer of 2018. According to the 2019 report by the US state department, human rights organisations reported police used the threat of arrest to assault, harass, and sexually and monetarily extort LGBTI individuals

=== Public opinion ===
There are a number of sexual minorities who do not consider the law to be an important factor in dealing with homophobia; as one homosexual explained to the Gay Times, "If society was OK with who we are, we'd be OK.". Kiru also explained that it is generally accepted that urban areas are more supportive of sexual minorities than rural areas. It is reported that the youth have had an attitude change to how they view sexual minorities that has not affected the adults.

==== Socialising ====
IGLA state that 34% would feel uncomfortable socialising with an LGBT person.

It is considered difficult for many sexual minorities to socialise happily, and bullying is reported to be a common problem. It is however reported that the youth hold a more supportive attitude towards sexual minorities in contrast to the previous generation and that this change to how they view sexual minorities has not affected the adults.

==== Social Scientists Association data ====
A study conducted by Social Scientists Association, a think tank based in central Colombo, Sri Lanka, revealed the perceptions of the general population on LGBTQ issues. 27% of respondents knew someone who was transgender, and 24% knew someone who was lesbian or gay. 60% of respondents stated that they would not be ashamed to travel next to a lesbian or gay person. 48.6% said it would not be shameful to have an LGBT child, but 44.4% said it would. The survey also revealed that, in the opinion of the respondents, "89% said LGBT persons face violence and abuse on social media because they are LGBT, 87% said LGBT persons face discrimination in finding rental housing and/or in school because they are LGBT, 69% said LGBT persons face discrimination by the police because they are LGBT".

When the Social Scientists Association asked whether it would be shameful for a transgender to be President of Sri Lanka, 49.5% agreed and 48% disagreed. The survey also revealed that 72.5% of people "said a person living life as an LGBT person should not be punished for their sexual identity; 65% said an LGBT person can do a job as well as any other person, and just over half (51.4%) said they would support legislation to ensure the rights of LGBT persons".

Those who are more supportive of LGBTQ are; likely to be under 30 years old, mainly live in urban areas, educated to tertiary levels or higher, have a higher awareness of LGBTQ issues, have more interactions with LGBTQ persons, and be a follower of Hinduism or Buddhism. Consequently, those who tend to be opposed to LGBTQ are also more likely to be followers of Islam or Christianity.

==== IGLA survey ====
Low birth rates on the island can make these statistics less clear to compare with other countries. For example, only a third of Sri Lankans surveyed were between the ages of 18 and 35, as opposed to 42% in India and 52% in Pakistan. The 18 to 35 age group is the community where change on their attitude towards sexual minorities in Sri Lanka is seen Also most opinion polls in South Asia are usually considered unreliable.

- 33% of Sri Lankans are opposed to providing anti-discrimination laws for workplace discrimination.
- 33% of Sri Lankans support the notion that homosexual relationships should be criminalised.
- 32% oppose providing equal rights to transgender people.

== Culture ==
=== Venues ===
It is considered that a gay culture exists on the island. Although a number of venues that cater to LGBT exclusively, or mostly, do exist, the bulk of the LGBT community frequent and meet-up at venues that predominantly cater to a heterosexual crowd and actively court the sexual minority community.

=== Music ===
Some contemporary pop and hip-hop songs also features LGBTQ+ themes. For example, "Red Lips" (අසම්මත පෙමක්-රතු තොල්) by A Jay can be considered a pop song featuring a queer theme.

=== Cinema ===
Thani Thatuwen Piyabanna (Sinhala: තනි තටුවෙන් පියාඹන්න, lit. 'Flying with One Wing') is a 2002 film written and directed by Asoka Handagama. It features a Sri Lankan woman who passes for a man in society and in her personal relationship.

Frangipani (2016) Sinhala: සයපෙති කුසුම, romanized: Sayapethi Kusuma is a movie about a same-sex relationship.

=== Literature ===
Katuyahana is a 2003 play by Visakesa Chandrasekeran

Gordon Merrick was one of the first western gay fiction authors, who lived in Sri Lanka from 1976 to 1988 and eventually died of lung cancer in Colombo.

Arthur C. Clarke was an ethnic-British gay sci-fi fiction author that included LGBT characters in his work. He lived in Cinnamon Gardens in Sri Lanka until his death in 2008.

Punyakante Wijenaike is a novelist that wrote about homosexual themes, including the 1971 book Giraya.

Shyam Selvadurai, now a Canadian citizen who was born in Colombo to ethnic-Sinhalese and ethnic-Tamil parents. He has written a variety of literary works about sexual minorities and he has won several awards.

The EQUALITY Magazine "portrays members of the community in a positive manner encouraging people to embrace their queerness without fear and shame."

=== Festivals ===
The Abhimani Film Festival has taken place every year within two weeks of the Colombo Pride being held under the auspicious of Equal Ground and the European Union. It is the oldest LGBT film festival in South Asia

The Colombo Pride has been hosted by Equal Ground and the Goethe Institut for twelve years. Events usually include workshops, dramas/shows/musicals, films, art & photo exhibitions, parties and a kite festival. PRIDE has faced difficulties by the Colombo Municipal Council and the local police when attempting to obtain permission to hold its events. They have also received threats of violence from radical groups.

The Diversity Games are held annually in Colombo by various lesbian, gay, bisexual, and transgender organisations.

=== Dating preferences ===
An informal survey found that the majority of sexual minorities in Sri Lanka found westerners sexually desirable, finding them more 'sensual and sexually adept' than the locals; only around a quarter had had sex with a westerner. None of those surveyed had issues with dating someone from the opposite ethnolinguistic group, either Tamil or Sinhalese. Apart from one person, the majority expressed dislike for Muslims (including Moors) and did not like them as friends or sexual partners.

There is a preference for youth among the community, though social respect for the elderly can mean older people are also able to find sex.

A survey found that the locals considered their own ethnicities "to be the most beautiful men in the world" placing them above westerners, the latter who were viewed as more 'sensual and sexually adept' than the locals.

== Living conditions ==
Around 43% of sexual minorities in Sri Lanka report 'high life satisfaction' as opposed to 24% in Pakistan and 34% in India. 64% of LGBT polled were single and not in a relationship. At least 51% of LGBT were out to family, a number that is higher than the number out to friends and to their workplace. Around 46% stated that they share LGBTQ content openly on their social media profiles, with only 22% stating that they would never share such content on their own profiles.

=== Homosexuality ===
Article 365 of the Sri Lankan Penal Code criminalises same-sex sexual acts; it remains on the books, although the Supreme Court has ruled it unenforcable. Human rights organisations have reported that the threat of arrest has been used by police and government officials to harass and intimidate LGBTQI individuals.

Lesbians in Sri Lanka were historically excluded from legal persecution until the late 1990s when during a political debate to dece homosexual sex, the law was in fact expanded by the ruling party to cover female homosexual sex as well. The media ombudsmann at the time described lesbianism as 'sadistic' though the island's society has moved forward since that time.

A 2013 study of young plantation workers found that out of those who had had sexual experiences, 86% of boys and 4% of girls "mentioned that they had same sex exposures".

The internet is the primary tool of communication for gays, with yahoo.com, gaydar.com, and gay.com being quite popular. 91% of gay men had lost their virginity by the age of 17. Facebook is also used to organise parties.

Homosexuals who live in rural areas tend to face a more homophobic climate and a worse financial situation, forcing most of these people to seek employment in urban areas.

The majority of lesbians communicate and socialise through the internet. A messaging app called Emo is used by many sex workers to find their clients, whereas the younger generation prefers to organize parties and gatherings through arenas such as Facebook and WhatsApp, with various online communities also services as a tool for lesbians to find romantic partners. 9% of LGBT in Sri Lanka reported they were in a homosexual relationship with another female.

=== Transsexuality ===
A patient who wishes to undergo sex reassignment surgery (SRS) must consult a psychiatrist for an initial evaluation. If the person is deemed to be of sound mental status, an official letter endorsing this can be issued. The patient can now start to undergo necessary hormone therapy prior to any surgical intervention. It can often be troublesome to find therapists who are understanding of transgender issues.

A major hindrance to most transgender individuals is that the island lacks many public or private hospitals that are able to perform SRS. The high costs of obtaining private treatment abroad can often be a strong deterrent from finishing the transition process.

It is currently possible for transgender individuals to obtain a new identity card from the Department of Registrations of Persons that is concordant with their gender identity, upon the provision of correct documentation to the department. However, many transgender individuals complain that they are unable to obtain the required documents (mainly medical notes) and therefore cannot register themselves for a new ID.

==== Financial difficulties ====
The provision of universal education and welfare has mostly allowed for more fluid social class movement that is not found in the rest of South Asia; "children, rarely, if ever, were prevented from going to school because they were female, from disadvantaged families or were poor." Despite this, the welfare system of Sri Lanka is complex and bureaucratic and living standards remain low, as assessed by the World Bank.

A number of transgender people complain about the high cost of undertaking conversion to their desired gender, in part because government-funded facilities are generally of poorer quality and that a lack of trained staff exists on the island.

Chandrasena’s success enables her to get first-rate medical care. She started getting hair removal treatments in 2009; the facial laser treatment she undergoes every six months costs about 6,000 rupees ($45), Chandrasena says. She also spends about 39,000 rupees ($300) for each four-month supply of the estrogen injections she takes every other week. Those prices are average in Sri Lanka.

Some transgender people are forced to work as sex workers in order to earn money for themselves, though they face the risk of being arrested as prostitution is illegal on the island

Ranketh, a transgender man who asked that only his last name be used to protect his identity, says he spent years looking for doctors and psychiatrists to help him through his gender change, but at first he couldn't find anyone to assist him.

=== Third gender ===
Recent political activity in India has brought the topic more attention in mainstream media. The recognition of the third gender in Sri Lanka is surprisingly prevented by attitudes within the LGBT community. A number of LGBT communities fear that introducing the concept to the LGBT rights movement and lobbying on their behalf would open them to further harassment from the wider society and may impede efforts to advance their own rights. A majority of people surveyed who identified as LGBT did not feel comfortable introducing the concept into mainstream LGBT rights lobbying.

There is generally a lack of knowledge in Sri Lanka about the third gendered community, which is further compounded by a general lack of knowledge on LGBT individuals whether they are homosexual or third gendered.

=== Mental health ===
A report published by the IGLHR found that sexual minorities on the island faced "high levels of sexual violence, emotional violence and physical violence" with insufficient support from the government or legal framework. This often led to high levels of suicide among the sexual minority community. The Colombo Telegraph called for further education of parents to ensure they support their LGBT children through their mental health problems and to prevent suicide.

== Human rights and legalities ==
The national human rights commission has been rated 'B' by APCOM, whereas Nepal and India have been given 'A'.

"The problem we have is that no one is prosecuted under the law," says LGBT+ rights activist Waradas Thiyagaraja. He said it is when the state takes legal measures, that activists can take counter-legal measures.

The United States Department for Justice wrote that the police were "not actively arresting and prosecuting those who engaged in LGBT activity" and that the provisions have also reportedly not led to any convictions to date despite "complaints citing the provisions of the law [being] received by the police".

=== Supreme Court judgements ===
The Supreme Court cannot strike down Article 365A because the Constitution of Sri Lanka does not provide the Supreme Court with the power of judicial review. The second republican constitution was amended to state "all bills passed in parliament shall become law after it receives the Speaker's Certificate (79), it will be final and cannot be questioned in any court of law (80.3)".

All existing written law and unwritten law shall be valid and operative notwithstanding any inconsistency with the preceding provisions of this Chapter.

— Article 16 (1) of the constitution:

In 2017, the Supreme Court had handed dowm the opinion that it would be inappropriate to impose custodial sentences on people who were accused of engaging in homosexual sex.

Summary of laws and regualtions
Legality of same-sex sexual activity	X mark	Article 365 of the Sri Lankan Penal Code, which criminalises same-sex sexual acts remains on the books, though the Supreme Court has ruled it unenforcable
Anti-discrimination laws	X mark	No antidiscrimination laws have been passed
Transsexuals	check	Gender-affirming surgery is allowed, but not easily accessible: many hospitals do not have the expertise to perform them.; Legal recognition of gender is available; process can be onerous.
Military service	X mark	
Third gender	X mark	
Men who have sex with men permitted to donate blood	X mark	Homosexual sex is classed as a high-risk behaviour by the National Blood Transfusion Service, along with drug use and having more than one sexual partner.

== Family and relationship policy ==
In 2014 Basil Rajapaksa, the lawmaker for economic affairs, stated that the government would not provide marriage equality for homosexuals. The statement was in response to a request by the British government to expand human rights in the country as a condition for the aid that the country gets.

Summary of family and relationship policies
Right of maintenance	No
Domestic violence	Uncertain, the legislation is gender neutral and can be used by sexual minorities.
Inheritance	No
Adoption	Restricted to married couples only.
Certification or recognition of same-sex marriage	Marriage acts restricted to relationships between a man and woman. Cohabitation rights are complicated and not enshrined in law.

=== Live-in couples ===
A large movement exists in India and Sri Lanka concerning the provision of live-in rights to partners who have not married. This would provide a centralised instrument to protect partners while allowing Hindu society to decentralise and provide ceremonies or blessings according to what each community thinks is right.

The rights currently provided to live-in couples mostly match that of married couples through criminal law, however, there are limitations on adoption, and wording used implies a heterosexual relationship.

== Politics ==
The politics of sexual minorities in Sri Lanka differ somewhat from the western norm. It is well known that there are several homosexual lawmakers in parliament that do not openly state their sexuality to the public, and there is at least one openly homosexual lawmaker in the cabinet. The majority of left-wing parties have mostly viewed homosexuality and the politics of sexual minorities as a non-issue and generally overlook it in favour of advertising populist policies that gain votes, with some of the most vocal homophobia coming from the far-left communist parties as per the traditional communist policy on homosexuality.

The highly influential Buddhist organisation, Asgiriya Chapter, has vocally advised the government to support reforming the constitution in favour of sexual minorities.

LGBT lawmakers have however been slandered for failing to lobby enough in favor of LGBT rights.

=== United National Party ===
The United National Party (UNP) is the main centre-right political party of Sri Lanka. It has on several occasions lobbied for and support extending rights to sexual minorities, and it also has several homosexual lawmakers. The UNP attempted to include decriminalisation of homosexual sex in the constitution, but this was vetoed by the left-wing UPFA.

UNP's relationship with LGBT rights in Sri Lanka
Date	Event
1995	G. L. Peiris, being Justice Minister, implements the amendment to the constitution that, among other things, criminalised lesbian sex. Note that the UNP was not in command of the parliament at this time and that the president came from the UPFA with the largest party being the People's Alliance.
2017	Nerin Pulle stated that the government would move to decriminalise same-sex sexual activity. but it did not occur.
2018	Mangala Samaraweera states his support for LGBT

=== United People's Freedom Alliance ===
Centre-left party, United People's Freedom Alliance (UPFA) has attacked the UNP for using homophobic slurs on several occasions. It had used homophobic slurs in parliament against the UNP whilst openly gay Mangala Samaraweera was speaking., Furthermore, during a major speech in November 2018 concerning the Constitutional Crisis Sirisena referred to the UNP using a term what was considered to be a homophobic slur by much of the media and the LGBT community, though the government denied he referred to LGBT.

Former Prime Minister D. M. Jayaratne had stated in 2010, whilst in power, that he was 'open' for discussions with the LGBT community as long as it didn't hurt the culture of the island nation. The party had also taken up the island's first transgender lawmaker and governor in modern history (since the advent of colonialism) through its choice of Niluka Ekanayake as the governor of the Central Province.

== Persecution and harassment ==
Particularly in this country, being 'out and proud' as an LGBTI or Q person is a very difficult task.

— Rosanna, Daily Mirror

Homosexuality remains a taboo subject and they are often associated with paedophiles due to several scandals and "anti-gay groups ... brand all lesbian, bisexual, transgendered persons as 'perverts' and criminals". Many "individuals are denied access to health services, education and employment and the ability to participate in social and public life".

There were many notorious human rights abuses committed by both sides during the civil war. Mentions about the sexual minority communities are rare, though same-sex rape is often mentioned as a social issue.

=== Police harassment ===
Although several human rights and legal persons have stated that it is illegal to harass and/or imprison sexual minorities, most police discrimination is not fought on an individual basis due to a fear on the part of the sexual minority that chasing an anti-discrimination case would 'out' the person in their private lives. The police introduced amendments in the police academic curriculum to reduce homophobia by the summer of 2018.

There have also been numerous reports of sexual abuses and rapes in prison of both homosexual and transsexual men/women at the hands of the police.

While there are hundreds of reports that people openly displaying homosexual affection in public areas have been harassed by the police, there have been hundreds of people displaying heterosexual affection in public areas also arrested by police.

== International views ==
There has been considerable support for reforming LGBT rights from various foreign political organisations. The EU, UK and Scandinavia have all attempted to use trade deals to forward LGBT rights. The UK's Theresa May and its ambassador to the US have both expresses remorse and regret towards the homophobic laws implemented in India and other Commonwealth countries.

=== United Nations ===
A resolution in 2015 at the UN General Assembly by Russia called for the benefits given to homosexual partners to be withdrawn. This bill was defeated with the support of the Government of Sri Lanka, which voted against the proposal, though the tacit support of the Minister for Foreign Affairs, who is the openly homosexual Mangala Samaraweera.

Sri Lanka also voted in favour of a resolution at the General Assembly calling for protections to fight violence against sexual minorities in early 2016.

It has also voted in favour of maintaining the creation of an expert post working towards protecting sexual minorities. In November 2016, Vietnam, South Korea, Japan, the Philippines, Israel, Thailand, East Timor, Nepal, Georgia, Sri Lanka and Mongolia were the only Asian countries in the United Nations to vote in favor of the appointment of an independent expert to raise awareness of the discrimination faced by the LGBT community and to find ways to properly protect them.

== HIV/AIDS ==
While HIV/AIDS is not only a public health problem for LGBT people, the HIV/AIDS pandemic has helped to open up a more public debate about gender roles and human sexuality in Sri Lanka. The high levels of poverty, combined with the stigma associated with the disease and conservative cultural mores, has made it difficult to implement comprehensive prevention programs and to offer life-saving treatment to those people already infected.

Initially, during the late 1980s–1990s, the Sri Lanka Government tended to ignore the pandemic. This may have been because of the political instability in the Government during the Civil War, or because of the taboo nature of the pandemic scaring off government officials. It was not until the early part of the twenty-first century that a national HIV/AIDS policy was developed in Sri Lanka.

As of 2017, a National AIDS Council has been established, the Government formally recognizes the United Nations World AIDS Day, more public education about the disease is available and efforts are being made to combat the prejudice people living with HIV/AIDS face in the workplace.

== Conversion therapy ==
Some private clinics in Sri Lanka claim to be able to "cure" patients of their homosexuality, although the World Health Organization does not view homosexuality to be a mental illness. Conversion therapy is a harmful and unscientific intervention that can cause significant mental distress to those who undergo it. Groups such as "Companions On A Journey" and "Equal Ground" are helping to educate the public on the dangers of such harmful practices.

== Social issues ==
=== Caste ===
The caste system does not play a strong or notable role on the island, and the island is often described as 'casteless' by Indian scholars, though the term may be used to describe other class-related issues too. Buddhism's influence on the island has also helped prevent casteism gaining a foothold on the island, with the politically orientated of both Tamils and Sinhalese being historically populated from a "caste" that comprises around 50% of each community.

=== Misogyny ===
Misogyny affects both lesbians and transsexuals as well as heterosexual women. Sunila Abeysekera was a human rights activist who died aged 61. Ms Abeysekera was both a single mother and an open lesbian by the time of her death. She states that Sri Lankan society discriminated against "involves women who challenge the heteronormative framework that teaches us from a very early age that women should marry men, be faithful, be good housewives, never refuse sex with their husbands, bear children, care for the household, and express a particular model of femininity, with no consideration of the physical, emotional and psychological cost for women."

Several publications in Sri Lanka shared the view that colourism against darker-skinned women was rampant on the island, with products such as 'fair'n'lovely' forwarding a racially biased and insensitive message to the population.

=== Sexual exploitation of children ===
Sri Lanka has a reputation among western paedophile circles as a major tourist destination for western paedophiles. It was historically among the top three sources for child pornography videos, along with Thailand and the Philippines. The Independent stated that "relations between boys and girls are discouraged until marriage, and until then many Sri Lankans take a discreet and casual attitude towards homosexuality".

'One father told me: 'what did it matter, my son won't get pregnant','

— Ms Seneviratne, The Independent

The estimates between how many boys are caught up in the sex trade vary from as low as the 1990s government figure of 1000 to independent NGO estimates of as high as 30,000. Sri Lanka is well known in Europe as a holiday destination for buying sex with young boys including in the relevant European gay community. A 2011 study found that these male sex workers gained little sympathy among the general public.

=== Emigration ===
A number of the island's sexual minorities move overseas in order to escape homophobia and poverty on the island, though problematically it is often only the strongest and privileged that can 'escape' the island, leaving the disadvantaged behind to fend for themselves. Equal Ground stated that it produces a small number of reports for refugee organisations every year, although the UK stated that it had not received any LGBT applications from either India or Sri Lanka.

Shyam Selvadurai is a notable emigrant from the island, being of mixed Sinhalese and Tamil descent, who moved and took up citizenship of Canada.

Conversely, a large proportion of the diaspora, notably the ones born overseas, have taken up stances objecting to the emigration of workers and asylum seekers from the island. It is notable that the emigration tends to benefit mostly the strongest and privileged from the island's society, contributing to a skills shortage and leaving behind the disadvantaged.

=== Colourism and racism ===
Sri Lankans resemble (and are part of the stock of) South Indians in terms of body build, face shapes and anthropology; most islanders have a brown skin tone, and often light skinned people are considered to be foreign by islanders.

Indian cinema industries are viewed as being discriminatory against browner skin tones, but the island's cinemas are dominated by island-produced movies, and South Asian cinemas are disliked by younger people.

A survey found that the locals considered their own ethnicities "to be the most beautiful men in the world" placing them above westerners, the latter who were viewed as more 'sensual and sexually adept' than the locals.

== Organisations ==
- Equal Ground
- Diversity and Solidarity Trust
- The Sakhi Collaboration
- Dedunu Sanwada
- Grassrooted
- Orinam
- NSACP
- Sarvodaya
- Global Fund

== Notable LGBT Sri Lankans ==
- Mangala Samaraweera is an openly gay lawmaker serving as the country's Ministry of External Affairs on behalf of the conservative UNP
- Niluka Ekanayake - the first transgender governor in modern Sri Lankan history for the center-left UPFA
- Shyam Selvadurai - fiction author, a naturalised Canadian-citizen with a Tamil and a Sinhalese parent who was born in Sri Lanka
- Rosanna Flamer-Caldera - gay rights activists and co-president of the IIGLA
- Gordon Merrick - one of the first western gay fiction authors, who lived in Sri Lanka from 1976 to 1988 and eventually died of lung cancer in Colombo.

== See also ==
- Tamil LGBTQ people
