= Star (2024 film) =

Indian Tamil-language film

- Theatrical release poster
- Directed by: Elan
- Written by: Elan; Thava Guru (dialogues)
- Produced by: B. V. S. N. Prasad; Sreenidhi Sagar
- Starring: Kavin; Preity Mukhundhan; Aaditi Pohankar; Lal; Geetha Kailasam
- Cinematography: Ezhil Arasu K
- Edited by: Pradeep E. Ragav
- Music by: Yuvan Shankar Raja
- Production companies: Rise East Entertainment; Sri Venkateswara Cine Chitra
- Release date: 10 May 2024
- Running time: 157 minutes
- Country: India
- Language: Tamil
- Budget: est. ₹12 crore
- Box office: est. ₹24 crore

Star is a 2024 Indian Tamil-language coming-of-age romantic drama film directed by Elan. The film is jointly produced by B. V. S. N. Prasad and Sreenidhi Sagar under Sri Venkateswara Cine Chitra and Rise East Entertainment. It stars Kavin in the lead role, alongside Preity Mukhundhan, Aaditi Pohankar, Lal and Geetha Kailasam. The film follows Kalai, a youngster, who pursues his dream of becoming an actor while facing various obstacles.

Initially, Harish Kalyan was cast in the lead role, but he was subsequently replaced by Kavin. The film was announced in August 2023 under the tentative title Kavin's Next, and the official title was announced a few days later. Principal photography commenced in June 2023. It was predominantly shot in Chennai, and filming wrapped by mid-February 2024. The film has music composed by Yuvan Shankar Raja, cinematography handled by Ezhil Arasu K and editing by Pradeep E. Ragav.

Star was released worldwide on 10 May 2024 in theatres. It received mixed to positive reviews from critics and audience, with praise for cast performances, cinematography, Yuvan Shankar Raja's soundtrack and background score but criticized writing, pacing and second half. The film was a commercial success.

== Plot ==
Kalaiarasan alias Kalai is a boy from a middle-class family whose only aspiration is to make it into the film industry as an actor. His father Pandian, a still photographer, is a pillar of support for his dreams as Kalai goes to various lengths to achieve this.

== Cast ==
- Kavin as Kalaiarasan Pandian aka Kalai
- Preity Mukhundhan as Meera Malarkodi (Poonakutty), Kalai's ex-girlfriend
- Aaditi Pohankar as Surabi Kalaiarasan (Jimikki), Kalai's wife
- Lal as Pandian, Kalai's father
- Geetha Kailasam as Kamala Pandian, Kalai's mother
- Lollu Sabha Maaran as Pandian's friend
- 'Raja Rani' Pandian as Surabi's father
- Dheeraj
- Niveethitha Rajappan
- Deeps as Gulabi, Kalai's friend
- Maadesh S.
- Revathi
- Sanjay Swaroop as Sunny Verma, an actor
- Sai Prasanna as mechanical Siva senior character
- Kadhal Sukumar as actor-turned-ice cream seller (cameo appearance)
- Vetrimaaran as himself (cameo appearance)

== Production ==
=== Development ===
In June 2019, Harish Kalyan, who had a successful collaboration with director Elan after Pyaar Prema Kaadhal (2018), was reported to collaborate with the latter for his next directorial. Amma Creations, headed by T. Siva, would reportedly produce the venture. On 5 December 2020, the project was confirmed by the director, during an interview. Yuvan Shankar Raja was revealed to have been brought on board to compose the score, in his second consecutive film with the director after Pyaar Prema Kaadhal. Yuvan was reportedly paid 6 crores for his involvement. The venture's production house, Screen Scene Media Entertainment Pvt Ltd, made a public announcement on 12 December. The official title, Star, was announced with a promotional poster that day. In July 2021, reports claimed that the venture was shelved, due to creative differences between Elan and Kalyan.

In August 2023, Kavin, who was praised for his performance in Dada (2023) and a long-time friend of the director, was reported to replace Kalyan for the lead role. On 27 August, B. V. S. N. Prasad, header of Sri Venkateswara Cine Chitra, who made his Tamil debut with Asvins (2023), and Rise East Entertainment announced that they would be jointly producing the film. On 10 September, Preity Mukhundhan and Aaditi Pohankar were announced both playing lead actress roles, with both pairing opposite Kavin, for the first time. The film marks as Priety's debut film, along with her Telugu debut Om Bheem Bush and Aaditi's second Tamil film after the 2017 film Gemini Ganeshanum Suruli Raajanum. Both were announced to play the roles of Poonakutty and Jimikky, the love interests of Kavin's character, Kalai.

=== Filming ===
Principal photography began with the first schedule on 1 June 2023 in Chennai. Halfway of filming was completed by 30 January 2024. Principal photography wrapped by 17 February.

== Music ==
Star

Soundtrack album by Yuvan Shankar Raja
- Released: 4 May 2024
- Recorded: December 2023 – February 2024
- Studios: U1 Records, Chennai; AI Watan Studios, Dubai; High Tide Studios, Germany; AM Studhgu bgvc HD ios, Chennai
- Genre: Feature film soundtrack
- Length: 25:06
- Language: Tamil
- Label: Sony Music India
- Producer: Yuvan Shankar Raja

Yuvan Shankar Raja chronology
| Pon Ondru Kanden (2024) | Star (2024) | Gangs of Godavari (2024) |

Singles from Star
- 1. "College Superstars" Released: 12 December 2023; 2. "Vintage Love" Released: 4 April 2024; 3. "Melody" Released: 20 April 2024; 4. "Jimikky's Ghazal" Released: 25 April 2024

The music and background score is composed by Yuvan Shankar Raja, in his maiden collaboration with Kavin; second with Elan after Pyaar Prema Kaadhal (2018). The audio rights were acquired by Sony Music India. The first single "College Superstars" was released on the occasion of Rajinikanth's birthday (12 December 2023). "Vintage Love", "Melody" and "Jimikky's Ghazal", the second, third and fourth single, released on 4, 20 and 25 April, respectively. The album, consisting of 10 songs, released on 4 May. The song "Oru Naalil" from Raja's Pudhupettai (2006) which did not feature in the film was re-used.

Track listing
| No. | Title | Lyrics | Singer(s) | Length |
|---|---|---|---|---|
| 1. | "Shooting Star" | Maathevan Thiyagarajan | Adhitya RK, Yuvan Shankar Raja | 1:16 |
| 2. | "Butterfly" | Vignesh Srikanth | Adhitya RK | 3:01 |
| 3. | "The First Rain" | Elan | Yuvan Shankar Raja, Priya Mali | 2:45 |
| 4. | "Star in the Making" (Orchestra Version) | – | – | 2:00 |
| 5. | "Vintage Love" | Kabilan | Yuvan Shankar Raja | 3:27 |
| 6. | "College Superstars" | Madhan Karky | Yuvan Shankar Raja | 3:17 |
| 7. | "Jimikky's Ghazal" | Hafeez Hoshiarpuri, Niranjan Bharathi | Neha Girish | 3:06 |
| 8. | "Melody" | Elan | Yuvan Shankar Raja | 2:16 |
| 9. | "Star in the Making" | Elan | Yuvan Shankar Raja | 2:01 |
| 10. | "Harmony of Hearts" | – | – | 1:56 |

== Release ==
=== Theatrical ===
Star was released on 10 May 2024 in theatres.

=== Home media ===
The digital streaming rights were acquired by Amazon Prime Video and the satellite rights by Zee Tamil. The film had its digital premiere on the streaming platform from 7 June 2024.

== Reception ==
=== Critical response ===
Roopa Radhakrishnan of The Times of India gave 3/5 stars and wrote "This quality of the film invariably leads to Star being lifelike, even when it's exaggerated". Janani K of India Today gave 2.5/5 stars and wrote "However, it ended up as a showreel more than a emotional and inspiring documentation of his life". Manigandan KR of Times Now gave 3/5 stars and wrote "However, it refuses to rise up to that point and just ends being an entertainer".

Anusha Sundar of OTTplay gave 2.5/5 stars and wrote "Star would have been undoubtedly that one film which could have broken Tamil cinema’s dry spell. Nevertheless, the film still creates some magic and belief". Bhuvanesh Sundar of The Hindu wrote that "It is only the memory of these few moments — and the inert good intentions of the film — that makes Star shine even when it falls".
