= Aaryan (film) =

2025 Indian crime thriller film

- Theatrical release poster
- Directed by: Praveen K
- Written by: Praveen K; Manu Anand
- Produced by: Vishnu Vishal
- Starring: Vishnu Vishal; Shraddha Srinath; Maanasa Choudhary; Selvaraghavan
- Cinematography: Harish Kannan
- Edited by: San Lokesh
- Music by: Ghibran Vaibodha
- Production company: Vishnu Vishal Studioz
- Release date: 31 October 2025
- Running time: 134 minutes
- Country: India
- Language: Tamil

Aaryan is a 2025 Indian Tamil-language action thriller film co-written and directed by Praveen K in his directorial debut. The film stars Vishnu Vishal, Shraddha Srinath and Maanasa Choudhary in the lead roles, alongside Selvaraghavan in an important role. The film is produced by Vishnu Vishal himself under his Vishnu Vishal Studioz banner. Aaryan is an adaptation of the 2019 Malayalam web series Menaka, which was also co-written and directed by Praveen.

Principal photography began in September 2022 and got wrapped in early-February 2025.

Aaryan was released worldwide from 31 October 2025, and had mixed to positive reviews.

== Plot ==
The story is unfolded in 6 days.

Day 1

On a live TV show, host Nayana interviews a famous actor Kailash, during which an audience member walks onto the stage and shoots the actor and injures him. The shooter introduces himself as Alagar and take the whole studio as hostages. He demands that the live feed has to be continued or he will keep killing. The channel staffs have to comply. He reveals that he is a failed writer that has written some novels that he believes to be a perfect crime story. He also claims that what is going on on the live TV is the act of his novel, during which he will kill one person every day in the following five days. He also says that he will announce the name of the victim one hour before every killing. On the live TV, he announces the name of the first victim: Narayan before killing himself. Police quickly find out that Alagar's real name is Narayan, making the first part of his promise come true.

Day 2

As the hostage situation has ended and the suspect killed himself, the police believe the case should be closed. But they assign officer Nambi to investigate further to confirm if Alagar's threat is true. Nambi initiates the investigation by questioning all people related to Alagar and finds nothing useful. At 7:00 pm, all the billboards in the city are hacked and play video of Alagar announcing the name of his next target: Ashok. The police take the threat seriously but due to the lack of detailed information, they cannot do anything meaningful. One hour later, an elderly security guard named Ashok is killed in a bomb blast at a phone booth while calling his family.

Day 3

Police have found that the video on the billboards are pre-recorded by Alagar and the bomb blast was caused by a coin-triggered mechanism. They believe that Alagar's threats are true and that he had set up mechanisms to kill his targets before his death. Police shut down all the billboards in the city to prevent panic, only to see later that Alagar's threat comes again on TV, which he also hacked, and announced the name of his next target: Raziya. Due to the lack of detailed information, the police still cannot do anything meaningful. As a result, a woman named Raziya, a Bharatanatyam dancer, dies of poisoning.

Day 4

In the evening, all people in the city receive a message via Telegram Messenger that the next victim is Yuvaraj. Police are deployed in the whole city to prevent any murder, and see nothing suspicious. The next morning, a young man named Yuvaraj dies at a hospital due to an accident he had the last night while diving. He was an environmental activist that often performed undersea protest. Police find out that his oxygen tank was tampered, which made him collapse under the sea and die later.

Day 5

Police learn that Alagar had donated all his wealth to six charity groups, each related to the profession or identity of the known victims. Based on this information, police believe the next victim would be a nurse. Later, a TV channel broadcasts an announcement that they obtained from an anonymous courier, announcing the name of the next victim: Asha. Using their database and the known information, police quickly identifies the victim and reach out to her, but she dies in the presence of police, due to poisoning. Police have also learned that the first letters of the names of the victims (Alagar, Ashok, Raziya, Yuvaraj, Asha) form the title of Alagar's novel Aaryan, making them believe that the name of the next victim will begin with N.

Day 6

A cleaner at a park finds a device that is likely used by Alagar to broadcast his message and hands it to the police. The device contains a video of the next announcement. It is not clear but sounds like Nambi will be the next target, whose name also starts with N. In the announcement by Alagar, Alagar finishes it of by saying "Shall I say it, Nambi sir?" However, the Nambi he is referring to is a transgender activist whose name used to be Nambi, before transitioning and changing his/her name to Nalini. Nambi is then placed under full police protection. While watching Alagar's video in the police station, Nambi finds a clue that suggests there's a secret room in Alagar's house that may solve the riddle for once. The clue is a burnt book, which Nambi earlier found near a dumpster bin. After putting a lighter flame near the pages of the book, an invisible ink blueprint of Alagar's house, with the time "8:00 PM" written. He heads there, and gets stuck in the midst of a crowded, Muslim festival, where some people are seen flogging their own backs. However, an automated message is sent to everyone there, with the text "You are my next victim." This causes panic and everyone starts to flock toward Nambi. Just then he is attacked by two of Alagar's men. After escaping from the chaos, he breaks into Alagar's house, goes to his bedroom, and finds that underneath the bed is a trapdoor leading to an underground cellar. After going down, and reaching the end, He is trapped in a locked glass chamber with water flooding. Just then, he remembers that there is a pocketknife in his pocket, and he manages to escape and rescue the victim in the secret room, a transgender woman named Nalini, which begins with an N.

The police close the case by claiming that Alagar specifically targeted some forgotten roles of the society to make them a martyr to raise the society's attention to them.

Character Backstories

At the end of the six days, each characters' backstory is revealed during a press conference, in which Nambi is awarded for his actions in saving at least saving the last victim, Nalini. Nambi talks to the press, saying that Alagar killed these people, so they could be acknowledge by the public, even if those individuals were never recognised for their selfless actions and service.

Alagar, the mastermind, was a brilliant but failed writer who could not get his "perfect crime story" (Aaryan) published or recognized. His self-inflicted death (Day 1) was the first act—a martyrdom to draw public attention to his forgotten art and the societal neglect of talent. By using the pseudonym 'Alagar' and making his real name 'Narayan' the first victim, he ensured the start of his coded plan and demonstrated the ultimate self-sacrifice for his cause.

Ashok was an elderly security guard (Day 2 victim) who died in a bomb blast while calling his family. His life likely represented the plight of the aging, low-wage worker in the city. He toiled in a physically demanding job long past his prime, often working long hours for minimal pay, providing security for others while his own well-being and life were neglected by the system. His murder was a statement about the forgotten, undervalued, and easily replaceable workforce.

Raziya (Day 3 victim) was a Bharatanatyam dancer who died of poisoning. Her backstory could highlight the struggle of artists dedicated to preserving traditional Indian arts in a rapidly modernizing society. She faces backlash from her Muslim kin as teaching and dancing to Hindu traditions is against their beliefs. They also throw black ink on her face for not accepting to their demands. Her Hindu neighbours show disinterest in her dancing class and tell her that these days instead of classical dance she should teach Zumba or Salsa. Despite years of dedication, her art might have been struggling for funding, recognition, and an audience, leaving her to lead a life of poverty or struggle. Her death aimed to draw attention to the forgotten value of classical art and its dedicated practitioners.

Yuvaraj (Day 4 victim) was a young environmental activist who often performed undersea protests and died due to tampering with his oxygen tank. His life was dedicated to protecting the environment, a cause often ignored or suppressed by powerful interests (corporations, government). Despite his efforts, he may have been marginalized, ridiculed, or his work obstructed. His death aimed to make him a martyr for a forgotten cause—the health of the planet and the safety of those who fight for it.

Asha George (Day 5 victim) was a nurse who died of poisoning in the presence of the police. Her backstory would focus on the often-invisible and unrewarded sacrifices of healthcare workers. She may have been overworked, underpaid, and suffered from burnout and trauma, particularly after public health crises, yet her dedication and role were quickly forgotten once the immediate danger passed. Her murder aimed to highlight the neglect of essential frontline workers after the public spotlight had moved on.

Nalini (Day 6 victim, rescued) was a transgender woman. Her identity itself places her among one of the most marginalized and forgotten segments of society, often facing discrimination, exclusion, and violence. Alagar chose her as the final victim—the one who would complete the title A-A-R-Y-A-N—to make a definitive statement about the extreme social neglect and struggle for basic rights faced by the transgender community. By being rescued, she survives to become the living face of the movement Alagar died to promote.

== Cast ==
- Vishnu Vishal as DCP Arivudai Nambi
- Selvaraghavan as Narayanan "Azhagar"
- Shraddha Srinath as Nayana, Journalist
- Avinash Yelandur as DGP Ravi Chakrapani
- Maanasa Choudhary as Anitha "Ammu", Nambi's Wife
- Karunakaran as News Presenter Jagdish
- Sai Ronak as Kailash, Film Actor
- Vela Ramamoorthy as Minister Ashok
- Taarak Ponnappa as Officer Kabir
- Jayakumar Janakiraman as Commissioner Bobby
- Samragni Rajan as Officer Sreshta
- Ananth Jayachadran as Officer Jai
- Raja Rani Pandian as Ashok, Victim 2
- Aishwarya as Raziya, Victim 3
- Abhishek Joseph George as Yuvaraj, Victim 4
- Maala Parvathi as Asha George, Victim 5
- Jeeva Subramanian as Nalini / Nambi, Victim 6
- Geetha Kailasam as Raziya’s mother
- Mathew Varghese as Anitha’s father
- Chandru BCS as Security In-Charge
- Ravi Venkatraman as Police Officer
- Shruthi Narayanan as Journalist

== Production ==
Before the release of Gatta Kusthi (2022), in early-September 2022, Vishnu Vishal announced his next project, to be a crime-investigative thriller film, titled Aaryan. The film is written and directed by Praveen K, who had earlier worked as an associate to Gautham Vasudev Menon in his directorial debut and produced by Vishnu Vishal under his Vishnu Vishal Studioz banner. Vishnu Vishal's previous film, FIR's (2022) director Manu Anand has co-written along with Praveen. During the first-look poster release, Praveen mentioned that Vishnu Vishal would play the role of a young police officer, while Shraddha Srinath and Vani Bhojan would play the roles as a TV anchor and a forensic expert respectively. Selvaraghavan was announced to play the role of an antagonist. Apart from them, the film also features Tarak Ponnappa, Abhishek Joseph George and Maala Parvathi in important roles. Vishnu Vishal stated the film has its title named after his son.

The technical team consists of Ghibran Vaibodha as its music composer, debutant Vishnu Subhash as its cinematographer, San Lokesh as its editor and Stunt Silva as its action choreographer. In October 2024, it was reported that cinematographer Harish Kannan was on board, replacing the previously announced Vishnu Subhash. The launch event took place in Chennai after a formal pooja ceremony on 2 September 2022. Began production in September 2022, the filming resumed after a significant break in September 2024. The final schedule of the filming began on 9 December 2024 and got wrapped on 4 February 2025.

== Music ==
Aaryan

Soundtrack album by Ghibran Vaibodha
- Genre: Feature film soundtrack
- Language: Tamil
- Label: Zee Music
- Producer: Ghibran Vaibodha

Ghibran Vaibodha chronology
Rambo (2025)	Aaryan (2025)	Others (2025)

Singles from Aaryan
- 1. "I'm The Guy" Released: 13 October 2025; 2. "Azhagiyaley" Released: 26 October 2025; 3. "Naan Ingey" Released: 31 October 2025

The film has music composed by Ghibran Vaibodha reuniting in his second collaboration with Vishnu Vishal after Ratsasan (2018). The first single titled "I'm The Guy" released on 13 October 2025. The second single titled "Azhagiyaley " was released on 26 October 2025. The third single "Naan Ingey" was released on 31 October 2025.

Tamil
No.	Title	Lyrics	Singer(s)	Length
1.	"I'm The Guy"	Vamanaa	Ghibran Vaibodha, Guru Hariraj
2.	"Azhagiyaley"	Nalangilli	Ghibran Vaibodha, Abby V, Bhritta
3.	"Naan Ingey"	Selvamira	Ghibran Vaibodha, Yazin Nizar, Bhritta

Telugu
No.	Title	Lyrics	Singer(s)	Length
1.	"I'm The Guy"	Samrat	Ghibran Vaibodha, Sreekanth Hariharan
2.	"Parichayamey"	Samrat	Ghibran Vaibodha, Abby V, Bhritta
3.	"Nenithe"	Samrat	Ghibran Vaibodha, Yazin Nizar, Bhritta

== Release ==
=== Theatrical ===
Aaryan was released in theatres on 31 October 2025. Apart from its original Tamil language, the film is also planned to be dubbed and released in Telugu, Malayalam, Kannada and Hindi languages. To avoid clashing with Mass Jathara and Baahubali: The Epic, the Telugu version's release was postponed by a week, with a release scheduled on 7 November 2025.

In Malaysia, the film was distributed by DMY Creation.

=== Home media ===
The post-theatrical streaming rights of the film were acquired by Netflix, and it will stream from 28 November 2025, in Tamil, alongside dubbed versions in Hindi, Telugu, Kannada and Malayalam.

== Reception ==
=== Critical response ===
Abhinav Subramanian of The Times of India gave 3/5 stars and wrote "Thankfully, after a draggy start, Aaryan pulls itself together in the second half. The "how" of the murders and the ticking clock deliver some genuinely racy, interesting thrills. [...] A steady thriller, albeit the social cause felt like a forced final chapter." Anusha Sundar of OTT Play gave 2/5 stars and wrote "With some solid threads, Aaryan would have been a great case to explore the psyche of a serial killer whose reasonings are beyond logic and sometimes unacceptable by sanity. But instead, when it falls back to the regular serial killer film, Aaryan loses steam and further interest." Arjun Menon of The Indian Express gave 2/5 stars and wrote "Vishnu Vishal approaches the role with the necessary detachment it demands. He understands the assignment and wisely stays out of the script's way, allowing its simplified thrills to unfold as intended." Janani K of India Today gave 2/5 stars and wrote "'Aaryan' promised an intelligent cat-and-mouse thriller but ultimately collapses under the weight of its messy messaging. 'Aaryan' doesn't just disappoint, it forces viewers to question the morality at its core and leaves a lasting sense of unease about the storytellers themselves."

=== Box office ===
In Malaysia, the film opened at Seventh place at the box office, finishing ahead of the Indonesian releases Kitab Sijjin dan Illiyyin. it remained in the top ten for two consecutive weeks, dropping to tenth place in its second week.
