= LGBTQ culture in Chennai =

Chennai has LGBTQIA cultures that are diverse concerning- socio-economic class, gender, and degree of visibility and politicisation. They have historically existed in the margins and surfaced primarily in contexts such as transgender activism and HIV prevention initiatives for men having sex with men (MSM) and trans women (TG).

== List of organizations ==
Community development may be traced back to Sunil Menon's mapping of sexual networks among MSM and TG in the early 1990s and the subsequent formation of Sathe Honduran, the oldest group of its kind in the city and state to provide spaces for community support and sexual health, primarily for working-class MSM who visit public cruising spots.

There are currently over 15 groups in Chennai that work on LGBTQIA+ issues. Most of them are community-run initiatives, and some are NGOs.

Most of these groups are part of the informal Chennai Rainbow Coalition, formed in 2009, to jointly work towards visibility and advocacy. The group was expanded in 2014 to constitute the Tamil Nadu Rainbow Coalition, with membership from groups around the state.

=== Research ===
Chennai has two research institutes that partner with community groups to conduct social science and biomedical research on LGBTQIA+ issues. The Centre for Sexuality and Health Research and Policy has published extensively on issues such as stigma and discrimination faced within the healthcare system by MSM and trans women, legal recognition of transgender identity, and other issues. The National Institute for Research on Tuberculosis (NIRT), in partnership with the community group Sahodaran and Harvard University School of Public Health carries out studies of mental health and HIV prevention] among men who have sex with men.

== Significant Events in Chennai's LGBTQIA+ history ==
- 1986: Screening of My Beautiful Laundrette at British Council – same-sex love depicted on the big screen for the first time in Chennai
- 1993: Publication of Robert Oostvogels and Sunil Menon's mimeograph 'Men Who Have Sex With Men-Assessment of situation in Madras', prepared for the Government of Tamil Nadu
- 1993: Sekar Balasubramaniam, a volunteer of Community AIDS Network (CAN), comes out as gay and HIV-positive.
- 1998: Sahodaran, first group for sexual minorities formed in Chennai
- 1999: Mailing list gaychennai started on yahoogroups.com, the first listserv for the Chennai gay community
- 1999: 'Queer Madras of the mid-80s' essay circulated on Indian LGBT lists
- 2003: Movenpick group formed (later renamed Orinam) the and mailing list started
- 2004: First Chennai LGBT film festival – Alliance-Francaise and SAATHII, with volunteer support from Movenpick/Orinam
- 2005: The Many Colours of Love: LGBT documentary festival - Alliance Francaise and SAATHII, with volunteer support from Movenpick/Orinam
- 2006: Conference on the third gender organised by Nalamdana
- 2006: Orinam.net website launched
- 2006: March for transgender rights when legislative assembly was in session in TN, organised by Sangama, THAA, SWAM, and other groups. Catalysed TN govt initiatives for transgender welfare.
- 2006: Suicide by self-immolation of transgender teenager Pandiammal/Pandian, sexually abused by Chennai police
- 2007: Madras High Court ruling in Jayalakshmi vs. State of Tamil Nadu by AP Shah
- 2007: Sangama establishes Chennai chapter
- 2007: Police advocacy on sexuality issues initiated by Tamil Nadu AIDS Control Society, implemented by community groups
- 2007: Shakti Resource Centre formed, organises film series Desire and Sexuality at LV Prasad Film and TV Academy
- 2008: Rose Venkatesan becomes first out trans woman talk show host on Chennai television
- 2008: Double-suicide of Christy and Rukmini
- 2008: Peer-counseling preparatory workshop (4 sessions: 8 June, 15 June, 22 June, July 6) of Shakthi Resource Centre in collaboration with Sahayatrika, Sahodaran, Orinam/MP, and Lotus Sangam.
- 2008: Aravani (Transgender) Welfare Board constituted by state government
- 2009: Thirunangaithe.net, world's first matrimonial website for trans women, launched by Kalki Subramaniam of Sahodari Foundation
- 2009: Shakthi Resource Centre and Orinam/MP joint meeting Sept 12 to assess needs for peer counselling workshop
- 2009: Peer-counseling multi-weekend course of Shakthi Resource Centre and Center for Counselling.
- 2009: Public screening of Milk, organised by US Consulate at Film Chamber, as part of the Oscars film festival.
- 2009: The Hindu, national newspaper published in Chennai, features editorial in support of LGBT rights post- Naz decision
- 2009: First Chennai Rainbow Pride March
- 2009: Campaign for Open Minds launched
- 2009: Chennai Rainbow Coalition started
- 2009: First meet for parents of LGBT people] in Chennai organised by Center for Counselling.
- 2009: Reverend George Zachariah delivers inspiring sermon at Gurukul Chapel calling on Christians to be inclusive of LGBT people
- 2009: Trans woman Narthaki Nataraj conferred Nrityachoodamani title by Krishna Gana Sabha
- 2010: First edition of 'Our Children'/'Nam Kuzhanthaigal' booklet for parents of LGBT children released by Orinam
- 2010: Chennai Dost formed
- 2010: Launch of Tamil edition of the 'Love That Dare Speak Its Name' post-377 anthology by Sangama Chennai
- 2010: RIOV, social group for lesbians and bisexual women
- 2011: Maatruveli (மாற்றுவெளி), Tamil academic journal brings out a special issue on sguest-edited, guest edited by Ponni and Aniruddhan Vasudevan
- 2011: Chennai Dost website launched
- 2011: Chemistry Club campus groups launched by Chennai Dost
- 2011: Public protests against homophobic remarks made by Union Health Minister Ghulam Nabi Azad
- 2011: Standard Deviation: first essay published on campus by a gay IIT-Madras student (then anonymous) makes waves
- 2012: Orinam's Quilt (reading group) launched.
- 2013: First officially sponsored LGBT sensitization event at IIT-Madras
- 2013: Chennai Rainbow Film Festival, organised by Chennai Dost and Alliance Francaise
- 2013: Reel Desires: Chennai International Queer Film Festival, organised by a collective of groups - Orinam, Goethe-Institut, RIOV, Nirangal, SAATHII, East-West Center for Counselling, Shakthi Resource Centre, Oye!Chennai
- 2013: Nirangal registered as an NGO (formerly Sangama Chennai)
- 2013: Orinam launches 377 archives
- 2014: Orinam launches 377letters, an online archive of letters] to the Chief Justice of India opposing the Supreme Court verdict
- 2014: First homophobic rally in Chennai, by Christians Against Homosexuality
- 2014: Christians Against Homophobia started in response to Christians Against Homosexuality. Mailing list goes national.
- 2014: Madras High Court ruling on 17 April 2014 'Jackuline Mary vs. The Superintendent of Police, Karur' cites NALSA April 2014 verdict to grant recognition to a police constable's right to self-identify as a woman and condemns physical/medical testing.
- 2014: Tamil Nadu Rainbow Coalition formed
- 2014: First book on Genderqueer in Tamil and first Tamil book on LGBTQIA from Srishti Madurai was released by BJP's state general secretary Vanathi Srinivasan at the 6th Hindu spiritual service foundation's sixth service fair, Chennai
- 2014: Nir, queer feminist collective, formed
- 2014: Vannam, IIT Madras queer collective formed
- 2015: Tamil movie "I" by Shankar released, with transphobic depictions, community protests throughout state
- 2015: Thirunangai (trans2 woman) Bhavana sexually assaulted by Pulianthope police after detention for an alleged crime (22 Jan)
- 2015: Chennai Rainbow Film Festival 2015, organized by Chennai Dost conducted on 26–28 June.
- 2015: TamilNadu LGBTIQ Facebook page Launched
- 2015: Tamil Nadu LGBTIQ Website news portal launched
- 2015: Tamil Nadu LGBTIQ organized online campaign for HIV Awareness on 1 December
- 2016: Madras High Court questions Centre on abysmal state of LGBT rights in India
- 2016: Community gathering, candlelight vigil and press meet leading up to Supreme Court decision on Curative Petition on 31 Jan
- 2016: Valentine's Day 14th Special Programme for LGBTIQ Community People By Tamil Nadu LGBTIQ Movement
- 2016: On 6 March Srishti Madurai's new website launched by Dalit activist and Ambedkarite Ma. Venkatesan from BJP in the presence of Central Minister Pon Radhakrishnan, Vanathi Srinivasan, Aravindan Neelakandan, Joe D'Cruz and Rashtriya Swayamsevak Sangh volunteers at Chennai.
- 2016: Community gathering and press meet for trans inclusion in political parties campaigning in state elections
- 2016: Queer and Allies Art Festival (QAAF) performances in Chennai, organised by MIST, 8 May
- 2016: LGBT activists hold a candlelight vigil in Chennai for Orlando victims
- 2016: Personal narrative of C Moulee, a techie and columnist from Chennai published his story on starting the LGBT employee network in the workplace and about being gay in workplace. The article brought more awareness on being LGBT in Indian workplace. In August 2016, C Moulee was featured in India Today's article – The Game Changers - on people inspiring change in the city of Chennai in India.
- 2016: Panel discussion exploring the intersections between violence against women and violence targeting LGBTIQA+ communities at fourth edition of Reel Desires, Chennai International Queer Film Festival 2016.
- 2017: LGBT Workplace — Expanding the Dialogue in India - event that brought together employers, employees and activists to address challenges faced by the LGBTIQ community.
- 2017: The Gabrielle Show – Chennai's First Ever Drag Show
- 2017: Community gathering and discussion on Online Safety and Harassment held as part of Chennai Rainbow Pride month
- 2017: First-of-its-kind Tamil Lesbian Anthem - A part of a documentary titled "Ladies and Gentlewomen".
- 2017: Launch of Queer Chennai Chronicles. An Independent Queer publishing house to chronicle LGBTQ lives in Chennai and to promote Queer writings in Tamil and English.
- 2018: Release of first Vidupattavai (விடுபட்டவை), first Tamil novella written by an out Queer man. The book was co-published by Queer Chennai Chronicles and Karuppu Pradhigal and was released in the 41st Chennai Book Fair on 20 January 2018. The book was released by Tamil writer and actor Shobasakthi
- 2018: India's first Queer LitFest was organised by Queer Chennai Chronicles on 7 July 2018.
- 2021: Tamil Nadu High Court suggests school and university syllabi to include LGBTQ topics

== LGBT workplace symposium ==
In May 2017, Chennai saw an event that brought together employers, employees and activists to discuss the challenges faced by the queer (LGBTIQ) community at work places. This LGBT workplace symposium, titled LGBT Workplace — Expanding the Dialogue in India, was hosted by RELX in association with the Amsterdam-based Workplace Pride Foundation and the Bengaluru-based Solidarity Foundation, with Orinam and Community Business as community partners.

Few of the panellists were Michiel Kolman, a senior vice president at Elsevier, Parmesh Shahani, head of Godrej India Culture Labs, Sunil Menon, founder of NGO Sahodaran, lawyer Poongkhulali Balasubramanian, Ritesh Rajani, an openly gay HR diversity professional, and also journalist Lavanya Narayan.

== See also ==
- LGBT culture in India
- Kothi (gender)
- Tamil Sexual Minorities
