= Orinam =

- Founded: December 2003 in Chennai, India
- Location: Chennai
- Website: orinam.net

Orinam (Tamil: ஓரினம்) is a non-funded, social, and activist collective that works to enhance understanding of alternate sexualities and gender identities among families, communities and society. It was founded in 2003 in Chennai under the name MovenPick and is one of the oldest collective of its kind in India. People affiliated with Orinam are from or trace their ancestry to the following geo-cultural: People of Tamil Origin from Tamil Nadu, India. Orinam provides a platform for creative expression, personal and social commentary by Queer people of Tamil Origin and of Indian Origin primarily. Orinam also acts as a local support group in Chennai for the queer community. Orinam also partners with the city-, state- and national initiatives around decriminalisation of homosexuality by amending Section 377 of the Indian Penal Code and LGBTQ rights.

== History ==
The collective was co-founded on 25 December 2003 by a group of queer men with the name "MovenPick/MP". The name was later changed to Orinam due to a name conflict with an unrelated restaurant, MovenPick.

== About the name ==
"Orinam" (Tamil: ஓரினம்) in Tamil means "One kind" or "One Community".

== Activities ==
Orinam conducts various activities toward the awareness and celebration of issues affecting the LGBTQIA population of the Tamil, Indian, and diasporic population. "Queering Literature" or Quilt is a monthly reading group that discusses fiction and non-fiction written by queer and trans people of the Indian diaspora. "Vannangal" is an annual queer performance festival held just before the Chennai Pride March and is jointly hosted by Orinam, Shakti Resource Centre, and Nirangal. Orinam also hosts monthly meetups for the queer community in Chennai to provide a safe space for the community to meet and interact with one another.

After the 2016 Orlando nightclub shooting, Orinam curated and organized protests and vigils all over the country. Orinam is also associated with the Chennai Rainbow Pride March and the Chennai International Queer Film Festival.

In 2022, the Tamil Nadu government has published a glossary of LGBTQIA+ terms in Tamil in the government gazette. This glossary, a first of its kind in India, and Orinam was one of the collectives that has been instrumental in the creation of the glossary.

In March 2023, the collective completed 20 years of existence, during which it has continuously worked towards promoting inclusivity, awareness, and support for the LGBTQIA+ community. Members of the group have also worked on policy advocacy, created safer spaces, and served as peer counselors. Additionally, they have contributed to organizing, campaigns, panels, workshops around various queer topics, drag events, Chennai International Queer Film Festival and Chennai Pride March.

=== Chennai Rainbow Pride March ===
The Chennai Rainbow Pride March is held on the last Sunday of every June. It celebrates the visibility of alternate sexualities and gender identities and affirm the notion of self-respect as a key goal of the LGBT movement. It is organized by the Tamil Nadu Rainbow Coalition.

=== Chennai International Queer Film Festival ===
Chennai has been organizing LGBT-themed film screenings since 2004, including film festivals in 2004, 2005 and 2006, organized by the NGO Solidarity and Action Against The HIV Infection in India (SAATHII), curated by volunteers from Orinam (formerly called Movenpick - MP).

== Resources ==
Orinam also creates resources that creates awareness about LGBTQIA issues for various stakeholders, including for friends and family of LGBTQ people, for those that identify as queer themselves, for LGBTQ sensitization at the workplace and educational institutions, healthcare professionals, media professionals, law & enforcement officials, and issues surrounding religion and faith. They also offers a list of resources as crisis support.

Orinam curated a series of 500-odd letters called 377 Letters with one aim: to ask people—members of the LGBT community, parents, friends, supporters—to write in to the Chief Justice of India, explaining why the decriminalization of same-sex relationships matters and demand the scrapping of Section 377.

Orinam's website also features a series of personal narratives by those that identify as queer under the section.

After the passing of the Transgender Rights Bill by the Supreme Court in 2014, Orinam published a comprehensive list of the responses of collectives and commentators, including an in-depth critical analysis of the text of the judgment.

== See also ==
- Chennai Rainbow Pride
- LGBT culture in Chennai
- Tamil Sexual Minorities
