= Urvasivo Rakshasivo =

2022 film directed by Rakesh Sashii

- Theatrical release poster
- Directed by: Rakesh Sashii
- Written by: Rakesh Sashii
- Based on: Pyaar Prema Kaadhal by Elan
- Produced by: Tammareddy Bharadwaja; Dheeraj Mogilineni; Vijay M.
- Starring: Allu Sirish; Anu Emmanuel; Vennela Kishore; Sunil
- Cinematography: Tanveer Mir
- Edited by: Karthika Srinivas
- Music by: Achu Rajamani; Anup Rubens
- Production companies: Shri Tirumala Production; GA2 Pictures
- Release date: 4 November 2022
- Country: India
- Language: Telugu

Urvasivo Rakshasivo is a 2022 Indian Telugu-language romantic comedy film written and directed by Rakesh Sashii and produced by GA2 Pictures and Shri Tirumala Production. A remake of the 2018 Tamil language film Pyaar Prema Kaadhal, the film stars Allu Sirish, Anu Emmanuel, and Vennela Kishore. The music was composed by Achu Rajamani and Anup Rubens, with cinematography handled by Tanveer Mir and editing by Karthika Srinivas, respectively.

The film was released theatrically on 4 November 2022 and has been available for streaming on Aha since 9 December 2022.

== Plot ==
Sree Kumar (Allu Sirish) is a middle-class IT employee with a conservative upbringing. He shares a close bond with his parents, especially his mother, who has a heart ailment. His parents want to see him married and actively seek a bride. Sree Kumar is in love with Sindhuja (Anu Emmanuel), his colleague who is broad-minded. While Sree Kumar pursues her for marriage, she has her eyes set on achieving her dream of owning a restaurant in Paris and prefers a live-in relationship to marriage. If they ever reach a common ground in this conflict of ideologies forms the rest of the story.

== Cast ==
- Allu Sirish as Sree Kumar
- Anu Emmanuel as Sindhuja "Sindhu"
- Vennela Kishore as Satish, Sindhu and Sree's colleague
- Sunil as Chittibabu, Sree's uncle
- Posani Krishna Murali as Broker Murthy
- Aamani as Sree Kumar's mother
- Kedar Shankar as Sree Kumar's father
- Anish Kuruvilla as Sree and Sindhuja's boss
- Babloo Prithiveeraj as Sanjay Joshi;Sindhuja's father
- Ananya Nagalla as Divya, Sindhuja’s friend (special appearance)
- Rathika Rose as marriage broker receptionist
- Sivannarayana Naripeddi as Divya’s father
- Rajitha as Divya’s mother
- Gayatri Bhargavi as Chittibabu’s wife
- Mirchi Kiran as Police SI
- Kalpa Latha as Sharadakka, Office maid
- Naveena Reddy as satish wife

== Production ==
Speaking with Hanuma Kiran of 123Telugu, Rakesh Sashii has said that the original idea of the film was pitched by producer Allu Aravind, which he later developed further.

== Music ==
Urvasivo Rakshasivo

Soundtrack album by Achu Rajamani and Anup Rubens
- Recorded: 2021–2022
- Genre: Feature film soundtrack
- Language: Telugu
- Label: Aditya Music
- Producers: Achu Rajamani; Anup Rubens

Achu Rajamani chronology
Virgin Story (2022)	Urvasivo Rakshasivo (2022)	Month of Madhu (2023)

Anup Rubens chronology
Odela Railway Station (2022)	Urvasivo Rakshasivo (2022)	Tadka (2022)

Singles from Urvasivo Rakshasivo
- 1. "Dheemthanana" Released: 10 October 2022; 2. "Mayare" Released: 17 October 2022; 3. "Kalisunte" Released: 22 October 2022; 4. "Seethakoka Chiluka" Released: 27 October 2022

The music is composed by Achu Rajamani and Anup Rubens while the latter did the film score.The audio rights were acquired by Aditya Music.

No.	Title	Lyrics	Music	Singer(s)	Length
1.	"Dheemthanana"	Purnachary	Achu Rajamani	Sid Sriram	4:02
2.	"Mayare"	Kasarla Shyam	Anup Rubens	Rahul Sipligunj	4:06
3.	"Kalisunte"	Krishna Kanth	Achu Rajamani	Armaan Malik	3:35
4.	"Seethakoka Chiluka"	Sri Mani	Achu Rajamani	Sri Krishna	4:24
Total length:					15:67

== Release ==
Initially, the film was titled Prema Kadanta but was changed to Urvasivo Rakshasivo for undisclosed reasons. The film was released in theatres on 4 November 2022. The teaser of the film was released on 29 September 2022. News18 Telugu reported that the film was released in more than 400 movie theaters worldwide. The worldwide theatrical rights were sold for ₹7 crores.

=== Home media ===
The digital streaming rights were acquired by Aha and Netflix and the satellite rights by Gemini TV.

== Reception ==
Paul Nicodemus of The Times of India rated the film 3 out of 5 stars and called it a "wholesome light hearted entertainer" which has equal amounts of "humour, romance and emotion", also praised the performances and visually pleasing production values. Balakrishna Ganeshan of The News Minute rated the film 2.5 out of 5 stars and wrote "Urvasivo Rakshasivo is one of those rare films where the female character is portrayed as bold and given equal importance".
