= Ashwath (music director) =

Ashwath Naganathan
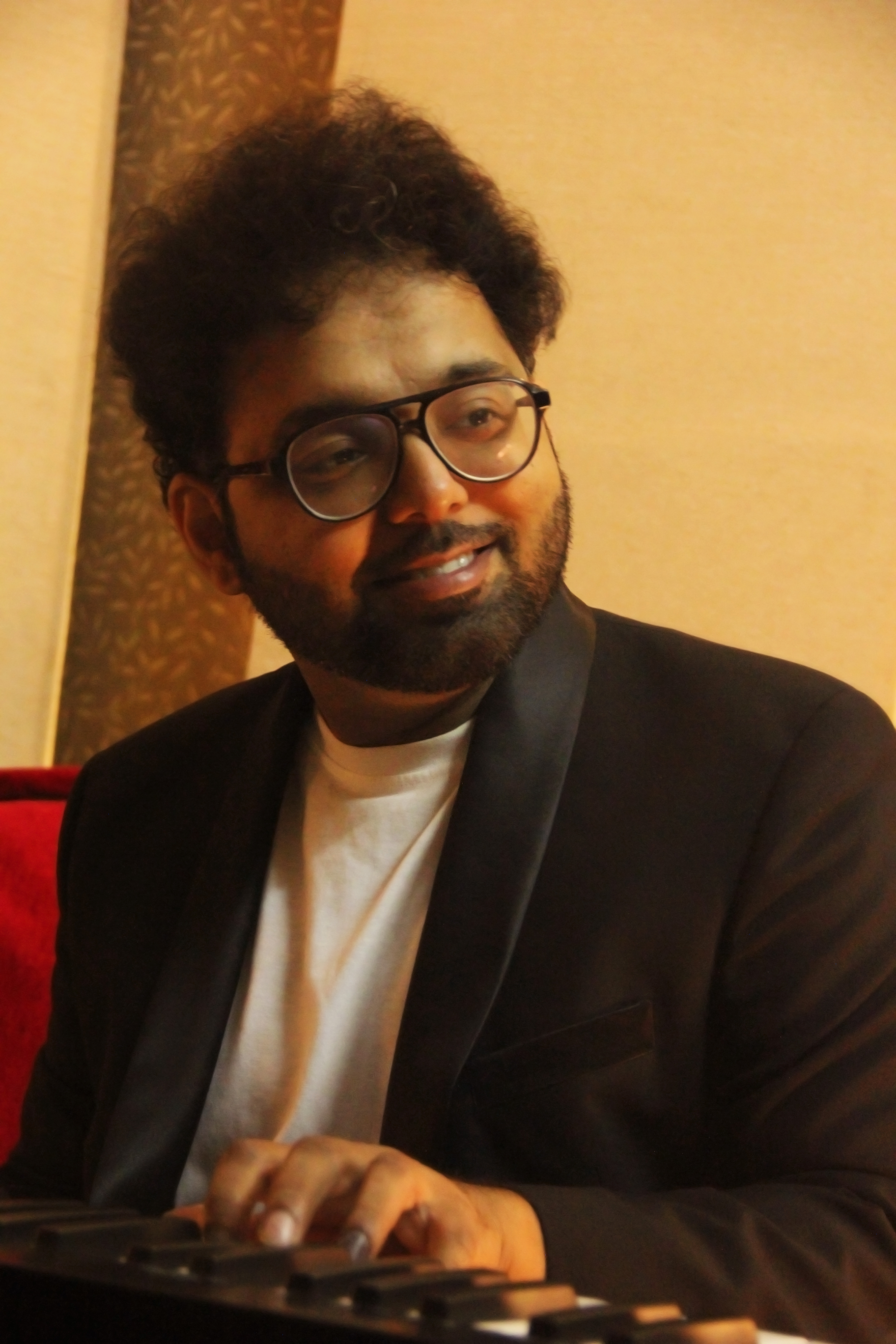

Background information
- Born: 2 October 1989 (age 36); Chennai, Tamil Nadu, India
- Genres: Film score, Independent music
- Occupations: Film composer, Music director, Independent musician, Song writer
- Years active: 2014–present

Ashwath Naganathan known by screen name Ashwath, is an Indian composer and musician, who predominantly works in the Tamil film industry. His notable works are FIR starring Vishnu Vishal ,Inspector Rishi on Amazon Prime Video, and for the YouTube Channel 'Certified Rascals'.

== Early life ==
After completing his post graduation in Media Studies at College of Engineering Guindy, Anna University, he was employed by NDTV as a News Producer/Director for a few years. Later he ventured into music full time.

He has composed music for about 75 short films including a few international award-winning ones, and more than 100 advertisements apart from a few plays & TV shows.

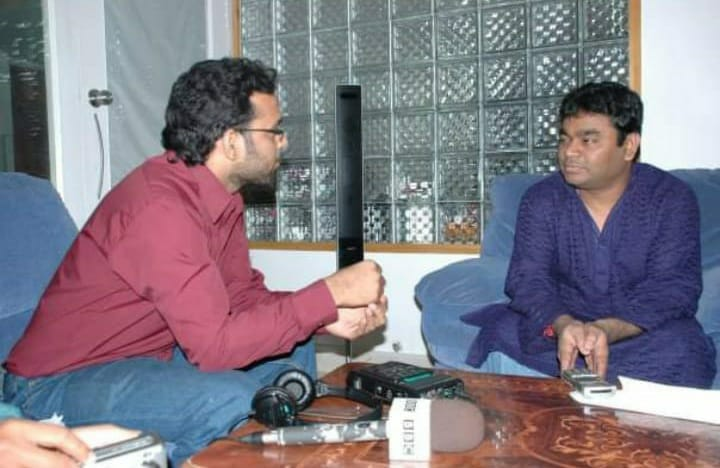
Ashwath with A R Rahman

His background in music is attributed to his gurus who guided him on classical music / western music during his schooling and the band he was a part of during college along with Music Director Vishal Chandrasekar. He was drawn into music during childhood and pursued it after he interviewed A R Rahman as an intern.

== Career ==
His stint with the film industry started with the opportunity to score for a feature film titled "Nalanum Nandhiniyum" by Film Institute students. Producer Ravindar Chandrasekaran listened to the songs on Skype and launched him through Libra Productions. The film has songs by leading vocalists across India including Shreya Goshal, Shankar Mahadevan, and got released in 2014. Though the tracks were not popular, the music of the film was written about as a positive aspect of the film in all the leading newspapers, websites and magazines.

His second film is a bilingual where he worked on the background score for considerable portions of the film "Tamilchelvanum Thaniyar Anjalum" in Tamil, Produced by ace Director Gautam Vasudev Menon. Though he did portions of the background score, he was credited in that film.

He has composed music for a few advertisements directed by Gautam himself. He is also a part time lecturer for students across Media colleges.

== Filmography ==
Year	Title	Language	Notes
2014	Nalanum Nandhiniyum	Tamil	
2016	Tamilselvanum Thaniyar Anjalum	Tamil	Background score only
2017	Thittam Poattu Thirudura Kootam	Tamil	
2018	What's Up Panimanishi	Tamil	Web series
2018	What's Up Velakkari	Telugu	
2018	Nila Nila Odi Vaa	Tamil	Web series
2022	FIR	Tamil	
2024	Inspector Rishi	Tamil	Web series
2025	Dhoolpet Police Station	Tamil; Telugu	Web series
