= Premante =

- Theatrical release poster
- Directed by: Navaneeth Sriram
- Written by: Navaneeth Sriram; Karthik Thupurani (dialogues); Raj Kumar Kusuma (dialogues)
- Screenplay by: Navaneeth Sriram; Karthik Thupurani
- Produced by: Jhanvi Narang; Puskur Ram Mohan Rao
- Starring: Priyadarshi Pulikonda; Anandhi
- Cinematography: Vishwanath Reddy
- Edited by: Raghavendra Thirun
- Music by: Leon James
- Production company: Sri Venkateshwara Creations LLP
- Distributed by: Spirit Media
- Release date: 21 November 2025
- Running time: 137 minutes
- Country: India
- Language: Telugu

Premante (transl. Love is...) is a 2025 Indian Telugu-language romantic comedy film written and directed by Navaneeth Sriram in his debut, starring Priyadarshi Pulikonda and Anandhi in the lead roles. The film is produced by Jhanvi Narang in her debut as producer, along with Puskur Ram Mohan Rao under Sri Venkateshwara Creations LLP banner, and Rana Daggubati serving as the presenter.

Premante was released in theatres on 21 November 2025.

== Cast ==
- Priyadarshi Pulikonda as Madhusudhan Rao "Madhi"
- Anandhi as Ramya, Madhi's wife turned partner.
- Suma Kanakala as Head Constable Asha Mary
- Vennela Kishore as SI Sampath, Mary's former subordinate turned superior.
- Ravi Prakash as Asha Mary's husband
- Kireeti Damaraju as Madhi's friend
- Abhay Bethiganti as Ravi, Madhi’s friend
- Ananth Babu as Sundaram Broker
- Hyper Aadi as Constable Prem
- Auto Ram Prasad as Constable Shyam
- Mahesh Chinthala as Constable Vigneshwar
- Aruna Bhikshu as Karuna
- Surabhi Prabhavathi as Sujatha, Madhi’s mother
- Meka Ramakrishna as Madhi’s father
- Kedar Shankar as Ramya's Father
- Padmaja Lanka as Padma, Ramya’s mother
- Karthik Thupurani as Biryani Server
- Bheemala Revanth as Chitti Chinthan
- Greatandhra Murthy as Chitti Chinthan’s grandfather
- Duvvada Srinivas
- Duvvada Madhuri
- Rashmika Mandanna as herself (Cameo appearance; Ramya Dongala Biryani promotion; end credits)

== Production ==
The film has music composed by Leon James, cinematography handled by Vishwanath Reddy, editing by Raghavendra Thirun and art direction by Arvind Mule. Along with Navaneeth Sriram, the dialogues were written by Karthik Thurapani and Raj Kumar Kusuma, with Karthik Thurapani contributing towards the screenplay also.

== Music ==
The first single titled "Dhochaave Nanne" was released on 9 October 2025. The second single titled "Pelli Shuru" was released on 8 November 2025.. The complete album has 5 soundtracks

Premante

Soundtrack album by Leon James
- Released: 2025
- Genre: Feature film soundtrack
- Label: Saregama

Track listing
No.	Title	Lyrics	Singer(s)	Length
1.	"Dhochaave Nanne"	Sreemani	Abby V	3:36
2.	"Pelli Shuru"	Sreemani	Shreya Ghoshal, Deepak Blue	2:28
3.	"Chill Madam"	Kasarla Shyam	Rahul Sipligunj, Venkata Chaitanya	3:30
4.	"Asha Mary"	Sanare	Mangli	3:16
5.	"Dhochaave Nanne(Reprise)"	Sreemani	Hesham Abdul Wahab	1:23

== Release ==
Premante was released in theatres on 21 November 2025. On streaming, the film was released on Netflix on 19 December 2025.

== Reception ==
Suresh Kavirayani of Cinema Express gave 2/5 stars and wrote "Premante offers nothing except forced comedy and a tiring narrative. Not a single scene stays with you, and the film struggles right from its beginning to its end. Debutant director Navaneeth Sriram gets a solid opportunity but squanders it with a weak script and an uninspired execution." Sangeetha Devi Dundoo of The Hindu wrote "Premante reaches for a balance between madcap comedy and a deeper look at relationships and the effort required to sustain them. It has its moments, but its introspective undercurrent never fully lands, leaving it as a film that is enjoyable in parts but unlikely to linger."
