= Nila Nila Odi Vaa =

- Release poster
- Genre: Romantic comedy Horror
- Written by: Nandhini JS
- Directed by: Nandhini JS
- Creative director: Venkatesh Harinathan
- Starring: Ashwin Kakumanu; Sunaina; Anupama Kumar; Misha Ghoshal; Abhishek Vinod
- Music by: Ashwath (music director)
- Country of origin: India
- Original language: Tamil
- No. of seasons: 1
- No. of episodes: 13

Production
- Producers: Viu & Make Believe Productions
- Production location: Chennai
- Cinematography: Vijay Armstrong
- Editor: Anand Govindasamy
- Running time: approx. 22 minutes

Original release
- Network: Viu
- Release: 24 July – 5 October 2018

Nila Nila Odi Vaa (transl. Oh moon, run to me) is a 2018 Indian Tamil-language streaming television series hosted on Viu. It is written and directed by Nandhini JS and produced by Viu and Make Believe Productions. This is Nandhini's first series as a director, who made her debut directorial venture with Thiru Thiru Thuru Thuru (2009). The series was released on 24 July 2018 and concluded up on 5 October 2018 with 13 episodes; the first season ended on a cliffhanger, leaving the chance for more sequential seasons open. It stars Sunaina in her series debut and Ashwin Kakumanu of Mankatha fame, with Anupama Kumar, Misha Ghoshal, Abhishek Vinod, Aswath Chandrasekhar, Srikrishna Dayal, Hariish CK, and Praveen Kumar in supporting roles.

== Plot ==
Omprakash, a tattoo artist, purchases a studio on the outskirts of Chennai in order to expand his career. He meets up with his college crush Nila, a vampire who tries attack him and stops after she recognizes him. Love blossoms between them both, and Nila reveals how she was turned into a vampire by Alex, who wants to turns the human-dominant civilization into a vampire-dominant one. A group of people called slayers are trying to demolish these vampires since they are considered bloodsucking animals.

One day, Nila introduces Om to her best friend Meera (a 125-year-old vampire), who rejects her relationship with Om since he is a human. On the same night, Alex catches Nila red-handed with Om, and they are both assaulted by Alex and the rest of the group until they are rescued by slayers, who burn Alex and his group by a new weapon. Om takes a promise from Nila not to turn him into a vampire; in turn, he promises her to turn her back into a human. After many trials, he arrives at the doorstep of Devi, a sorceress whose blood can turn vampires back to humans, and she herself becomes a vampire and turns back to normal after reading certain scriptures. Devi refuses to accept Om's pleas since she feels herself losing her control after her last encounter with a vampire in which she loses control and kills her own disciples.

A completely shattered Om is blackmailed by a goon who tries to kidnap his assistant Poonkodi. Suddenly, Nila emerges from nowhere and kills the goon. Om loses his temper and asks Nila to not be like a monster and get lost from his life. The next day, Inspector Jamal, a slayer, investigates the case and finds out Nila to be a vampire. Nila hides in Meera's home and stops drinking blood because of Om's accusations. Om becomes more concerned about Nila and goes to rescue her when Meera was caught by the slayers. He confesses to Nila that he was afraid to lose her and is deeply in love with her. Suddenly, the slayers attack them, and Nila hypnotized one of them to sleep, while the other was hurt by Om.

Nila becomes very weak because of her blood strike. Om offers his blood, but she refuses it because of her promise. Om takes Nila to Devi, who changes her mind and decides to help Nila while preparing for the arrangements. Jamal attacks them from outside the home. Devi asks Nila if she had hypnotized Om into loving her. Nila reveals that none of the vampires are able to hypnotize Om. Jamal shoots an arrow which strikes Om. Devi informs to an almost-dying Om that he is just like her and his blood can turn Nila back to a human. Upon hearing this, he asks Nila to suck his blood, and she obeys. Jamal breaks into Devi's house and is shocked to see Nila, who is now a human. The series ends by revealing that Om has become a ferocious vampire.

== Cast ==
- Ashwin Kakumanu as Om (Om Prakash): a human turned vampire
- Sunaina as Nila, a vampire turned human
- Anupama Kumar as Devi
- Misha Ghoshal as Meera
- Srikrishna Dayal as Jamaal
- Abhishek Vinod as Alex
- Aswath Chandrasekhar as Thomas
- Gabriella Sellus as Poonkodi
- Shira Gaarg as Patricia
- Vignesh Vijayan as Suresh
- Praveen Kumar as Vikram
- Hariish CK as Anand
- Bavithra as Yamuna
- Vino Lordson
- Ravi Venkatraman

== Production ==
This was the first Tamil series developed by Viu network with the intention of developing at least 100 more web series within a space of 3 years. Viu Tamil network roped in Nandhini JS as the director for the series titled Nila Nila Odi Vaa. It was also revealed that popular film cinematographer Vijay Armstrong used practical lights instead of the traditional film set lighting.
