= Nalanum Nandhiniyum =

2014 Indian film by Venkatesan R

- Theatrical release poster
- Directed by: Venkatesan R
- Written by: Venkatesan R
- Produced by: Ravindar Chandrasekaran
- Starring: Michael Thangadurai; Nandita Swetha
- Cinematography: Nizar Shafi
- Edited by: I J Alen
- Music by: Ashwath
- Production company: Libra Productions
- Distributed by: Libra Productions
- Release date: 11 July 2014
- Running time: 132 minutes
- Country: India
- Language: Tamil

Nalanum Nandhiniyum (transl. Nalan and Nandhini) is a 2014 Indian Tamil-language romance film written and directed by Venkatesan R, making his directorial debut. The film is produced and distributed by Ravindar Chandrasekaran under Libra Productions, his first film under the banner. It stars Michael Thangadurai and Nandita Swetha in lead roles, while Jayaprakash, Azhagam Perumal, and Soori play supporting roles. The music is composed by Ashwath Naganathan, and the film was released on 11 July 2014.

== Plot ==
Duraipandi and Arunachalam have a worsening foe, but Nalan, the son of Duraipandi's sister, and Nandhini, Arunachalam's daughter, have known each other from childhood, love each other, get married, and move to Chennai. Nandhini finds work as a teacher. Her falling pregnant and losing her job is a wake-up call; Nalan tries and succeeds in breaking into the film industry and becoming a successful director.

== Cast ==
- Michael Thangadurai as Nalan
- Nandita Swetha as Nandhini
- Jayaprakash as Duraipandi
- Azhagam Perumal as Arunachalam
- Soori as Sivabalan
- Renuka as Rajalakshmi
- Soundararaja as Muthu
- Rinson Simon as Nalan's brother
- Chaams
- Jangiri Madhumitha
- Ravi
- Venkat Prabhu (guest appearance)
- S. P. Charan (guest appearance)
- T. Siva (guest appearance)
- P. L. Thenappan (guest appearance)

== Production ==
Nalanum Nandhiniyum is the directorial debut of Venkatesan R and the first film produced by Ravindar Chandrasekaran's Libra Productions. The film was shot prominently in Chennai, Erode and Madurai.

== Soundtrack ==
The music was composed by Ashwath, in his debut. The audio launch was held on 1 June 2013 at the Victoria Hall in Geneva, though the tracklist was unveiled a few days before.

Track listing
No.	Title	Lyrics	Singer(s)	Length
1.	"Kadhal Veesum"	Na. Muthukumar	P. Unnikrishnan, Pop Shalini, Sowmya	4:22
2.	"Vaadagai Koodu"	Madhan Karky	Shreya Ghoshal, S. P. Charan	4:45
3.	"Gummunu Varugudhu"	Viveka	Vijay Prakash	4:51
4.	"Thoongama"	Niranjan Bharathi	Balram, Chinmayi Sripada	4:44
5.	"Sala Sala"	Viveka	Shankar Mahadevan, Sachin Warrier	4:44
6.	"Veetukkula Vaanavillu"	Madhan Karky	Deepak, Madhumitha, Swathi Ravichandran	4:26
Total length:				27:52

== Release ==
Nalanum Nandhiniyum was released on 11 July 2014. Vendhar Movies initially acquired the distribution rights, but Libra Productions later distributed the film themselves worldwide.

== Reception ==
Anupama Subramanian of Deccan Chronicle judged the film "undercooked", failing to balance the intensity—such as the two warring old men, whose performances he judged the best part of it—with the "charming innocence of the romance". M Suganth of The Times of India found the plot trite and the film "content to coast on feel good moments and melodrama bordering on implausibility". Sify wrote, "The pace of the film is slow, which hampers the narration and makes it look like one long mega-serial. It has some heart-warming moments, but could have been better".
