= Pyaar Prema Kalyanam =

- Official release poster
- Directed by: Elan
- Written by: Nivedita Pohankar; Elan; Harish GY
- Produced by: Sreenidhi Sagar
- Starring: Elan; Saanve Megghana
- Cinematography: Dinesh K. Babu
- Edited by: Pradeep E. Ragav
- Music by: Yuvan Shankar Raja
- Production company: Rise East Entertainment
- Distributed by: Netflix
- Release date: 21 August 2026
- Running time: 126 minutes
- Country: India
- Language: Tamil

Pyaar Prema Kalyanam (transl. Love, Love, Marriage) is a 2026 Indian Tamil-language romantic comedy film directed by Elan, starring himself in his acting debut, and Saanve Megghana. The film is a spiritual successor to the director's Pyaar Prema Kaadhal (2018). It was released on 21 August 2026 directly on Netflix.

== Plot ==
Elan decides to walk away from his well-paying career in Dubai and head back to Chennai to start fresh. While he hunts for a new job, his conservative father sets up a traditional matrimonial meeting. A mix-up in identities leads Elan to cross paths with Pavithra (Pavi), a spirited social media creator. Her modern outlook balances his easygoing, grounded nature, and a whirlwind romance quickly culminates in marriage.

The real test starts right after the wedding rituals end. Unwilling to leave her childhood home, Pavi rejects the norm of moving in with her in-laws and asks Elan to stay with her parents instead. Because he is still in between jobs, Elan agrees to the setup, unknowingly stepping into the demanding role of a full-time homemaker.

While the welcome is warm at first, routine soon takes over. Elan finds himself overwhelmed by domestic chores, grocery runs, taking care of Pavi's elderly grandfather, and answering to a demanding mother-in-law. Compounding his exhaustion is the sting of social stigma and the feeling that he has lost his personal identity. Desperate for relief, he follows terrible guidance from his buddies and tries to subtly turn Pavi against her mother. The scheme unravels quickly, sparking tension and driving an emotional wedge between the newlyweds.

Matters come to a head when Elan’s own father berates him for abandoning traditional male roles. However, a heartfelt chat with his father-in-law shifts Elan’s entire perspective. He begins to see that the unacknowledged labor and emotional isolation he is experiencing mirror what countless homemakers silently bear every day. This realization reshapes his outlook, replacing his frustration with genuine empathy.

When a fresh career opportunity comes Elan's way, the dynamic flips once more. Accustomed to having him run the domestic side of their lives, Pavi hesitates to support the move. The tension forces both of them to look in the mirror: Elan confronts his insecurities around pride and traditional roles, while Pavi recognizes her own unfair expectations.

As their extended families escalate the conflict with rigid demands and cultural lectures, Elan and Pavi step back from the crossfire. They realize that making their relationship work requires discarding outdated formulas and listening to one another. Standing up to external family pressures, they commit to an equal partnership built on mutual compromise, wrapping up their turbulent journey by slipping away together for a quiet, well-deserved laugh away from the family madness.

== Cast ==
- Elan as Elan
- Saanve Megghana as Pavithra "Pavi"
- Radikaa Sarathkumar as Chandra Rani, Pavi's mother
- M. S. Bhaskar as Rajasekar, Elan's father
- Yogi Babu as Vinoth, Elan's friend
- Senthil as Nadhars Thatha, Pavi's grandfather
- Geetha Kailasam as Nirmala, Elan's mother
- Elango Kumaravel as Srinivasan, Pavi's father
- Lollu Sabha Maaran as Ganesh
- Deepz as Michael, Elan's friend
- A. Rajamani Paati as Elan's grandmother
- Mohana Priya as Elan's sister-in-law
- Aarush as Elan's brother

== Soundtrack ==
The soundtrack was composed by Yuvan Shankar Raja.

Track listing
No.	Title	Singer(s)	Length
1.	"Crazy Love"	Armaan Malik, Snighdha Chandra	3:10
2.	"Atrocity"	Mathichiyam Bala, Sinduri Vishal	2:58
3.	"High on Kaadhal"	Sanjith Hegde	4:57
4.	"Idiyappam Life"	Gana Bala, Chinnaponnu	2:34
5.	"Love is Beautiful"	G. V. Prakash Kumar	3:32
6.	"Habibi"	Adithya RK	2:14
7.	"Mapillai Singam"	Lakshmi Jai, Madurai Saroja	4:14
8.	"Richie Rich"	Gana Vinoth	2:10
9.	"Drama Queen"	Velu, Aravinth Annest	2:49
Total length:			28:38

== Release and reception ==
Pyaar Prema Kalyanam was released directly on Netflix on 21 August 2026. Bhuvanesh Chandar of The Hindu wrote, "In his acting debut, Elan looks and plays the part ably, but it is Saanve who stands out with her anchored performance [...] Seemingly written for the reel-viewing generation, PPK ends up as a glossy film whose good intentions rarely make a mark. It becomes even more apparent in the safe route it takes to resolve the conflict". Prashanth Vallavan of The New Indian Express wrote, "Pyaar Prema Kalyanam takes an interesting theme, marries It to a wholesome genre, and gets way too enthusiastic about turning it into a corporatised, formulaic, social media content, and thereby loses its way and our interest". Archika Khurana of The Times of India wrote, "Pyaar Prema Kalyanam remains brisk and largely engaging. Its treatment of marriage, family and gender roles is not groundbreaking, but its light-hearted approach gives the familiar conversation a refreshing perspective". Vishal Menon of The Hollywood Reporter India wrote, "In its rush to play it safe, while also trying to check all the right boxes, we feel stuck in a tiring game of tug-of-war between people we never feel at home with".
