= Elan (director) =

Indian film director and screenwriter

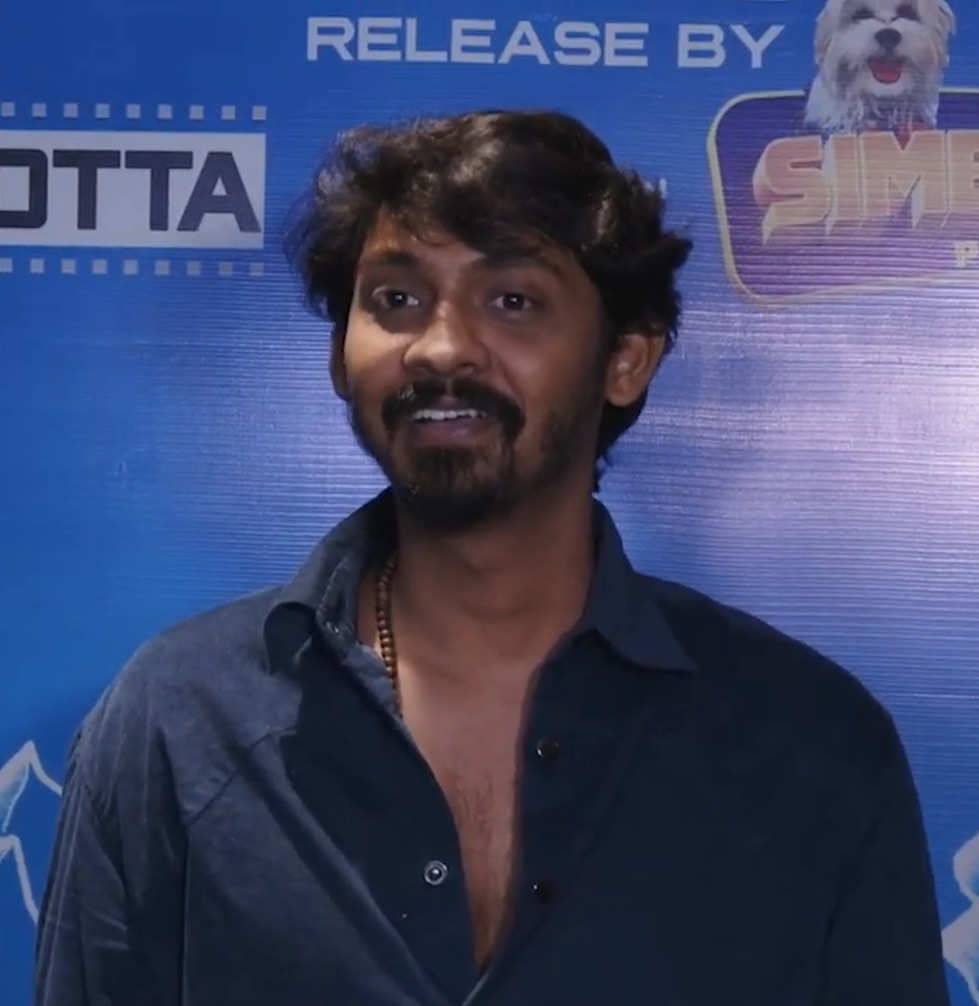
- Born: Chennai
- Occupation: Film director Screenwriter
- Years active: 2017–present
- Notable work: Pyaar Prema Kaadhal (2018); Pyaar Prema Kalyanam (2026)

Elan is an Indian film director, screenwriter and lyricist who predominantly works in the Tamil film industry.

== Personal life ==
Elan was making short films since he finished his schooling in 2007. He is the son of Stills Pandian, a photographer.

== Career ==
In 2017, he worked on Graghanam starring Krishna and Chandran. It was a thriller film about the happenings of a night. The film, however, remains unreleased. After completing a love story script, he began working on the next one without reaching out to producers. By chance, a friend of Yuvan Shankar Raja asked if he had any romance scripts, leading to Elan's debut directorial, Pyaar Prema Kaadhal (2018). In celebration of Pyaar Prema Kaadhal's success, Yuvan Shankar Raja gifted Elan a luxury car. The film was later remade in Telugu as Urvasivo Rakshasivo (2022). After the collaboration on Pyaar Prema Kaadhal (2018) with Harish Kalyan, Elan was reported to collaborate with Harish again for his next directorial in 2019. In August 2023, Kavin, was reported to replace Harish for the lead role and the principal photography began on 1 June 2023 in Chennai. In an interview, Elan stated that "Vaaranam Aayiram was one of my biggest inspirations to make Star." and that it was a tribute to his father.

== Filmography ==
As director
Year	Film	Ref
2018	Pyaar Prema Kaadhal	
2024	Star	
2026	Pyaar Prema Kalyanam	Also Actor

As lyricist
Year	Film	Songs	Ref
2017	Graghanam	"Don't Funk Me Up"	
2018	Pyaar Prema Kaadhal	"Let's Be Friends"	
2018	Pyaar Prema Kaadhal	"Secret Window"	
2018	Pyaar Prema Kaadhal	"Wake Me Up Everyday"	
2018	Pyaar Prema Kaadhal	"Miss You Papa"	
2018	Pyaar Prema Kaadhal	"It's Over"	
2022	Madhil Mel Kadhal	"Baby"	
2023	Rangoli	"Yeno Un"	
2023	Rangoli	"Yeno Un Reprise"	
2024	Star	"The First Rain"	
2024	Star	"Melody"	
2024	Star	"Star in the Making"	
2024	Madraskaaran	"Thai Thakka Kalyanam"	
