= Inspector Rishi =

Indian television series

- Genre: Crime; Drama; Horror
- Created by: J. S. Nandhini
- Directed by: J. S. Nandhini
- Starring: Naveen Chandra; Sunaina Yella; Kanna Ravi; Srikrishna Dayal; Malini Jeevarathnam; Kumaravel
- Music by: Ashwath
- Country of origin: India
- Original language: Tamil
- No. of seasons: 1
- No. of episodes: 10

Production
- Executive producer: Jithin Thorai
- Producers: J. S. Nandhini; Shukdev Lahiri
- Production location: India
- Cinematography: Bargav Sridhar
- Production company: Make Believe Productions

Original release
- Network: Amazon Prime Video; Kalaignar TV (syndication)
- Release: 29 March 2024

Inspector Rishi is a 2024 Indian Tamil-language horror crime drama television series created, written and directed by J. S. Nandhini for Amazon Prime Video. It stars Naveen Chandra, Sunaina, Kanna Ravi, Srikrishna Dayal, Malini Jeevarathnam and Kumaravel. The series was premiered on 29 March 2024 on Amazon Prime Video.

== Premise ==
An inspector, Rishi, loses his eyesight in one eye during a shootout, fails to save his girlfriend and gets transferred into a jungle area where he must solve the cases behind the myths.

== Cast ==
- Naveen Chandra as Rishi Nandhan
- Sunaina as Kathryn "Kathy" Shobana
- Kanna Ravi as Ayyanar
- Srikrishna Dayal as Sathya
- Malini Jeevarathnam as Chitra
- Kumaravel as Irfan
- Harini Sundararajan as Viji
- Semmalar Annam as Mangai
- Meesha Ghoshal as Yamuna
- Gajaraj as Vinod
- Vaishulisa Vallal as Punitha
- Mime Gopi as Sekar
- Deepthi as Hira
- Vela Ramamoorthy as Kaliaperumal
- Vasanthi as Mallika
- Kalairani as Mother Leana
- Geetha Kailasam as Faria
- Yaar Kannan as Udhayan Nambeesan
- Anandhi Jayaraman as Thulasi
- S.Pagalavan as Harish
- Manika Kandasamy as Ezhil
- Vijayalakshmi as Tribal Shaman
- Radha Dhandapani as Mangai's Mother
- G.L. Srinivasan as Ekambaram
- B. Smruthi as Nalini
- Baby Meenu as Dhanam
- Githa Mohan as Selvam
- VJ Aswath Chandrasekar as Abdul
- Saranya Ravichandran as Selvi
- Videsh as Jagan
- S.K. Gaayathri as Rani
- Madhuvanthi as Irfan's Granddaughter
- Jose Mathew as SP
- Sujatha as Ayyanar's Mother
- Jayaraj as Rathinam
- Ghitha Mohhan as Selvam
- Sudharsanam as Rishi's Friend
- A.V. Deva as Thangarasu
- Karthika Dinesh as Sangeetha
- Naveen Raj as Rishi's Friend
- Suraj as Irfan's Son
- Tamizharasi as Rishi's Friend
- P Rajalakshmi as Chitra's Mother
- Brindha as Dr. Kamali
- Keerthana as Jaya
- Dayalan as Ayyanar's Father
- Suresh Kayar as Robert
- R. S. Shivaji as Entomologist
- Sophia Victor as Vasanthi
- Lakshan as Irfan's Grandson
- Gaayathri Krishnan as Rani, Bala’s wife
- Sundarapriya MP as Lawyer
- Jeeva Ravi as Rishi's Father

== Episodes ==
No.	Title	Directed by	Written by	Original release date
1	"The Huntress"	J.S. Nandhini	J.S. Nandhini	29 March 2024
When a wildlife photographer’s mysterious death is blamed on a deadly forest spirit called Vanaratchi, Crime Branch Inspector Rishi Nandhan is sent to Thaenkaadu to investigate the case, along with sub-inspectors Ayyanar and Chitra.
2	"Devil is in the Details"	J.S. Nandhini	J.S. Nandhini	29 March 2024
The lack of physical evidence and the supernatural phenomena around the murder case baffles everyone. Rishi is haunted by a mysterious ghost from his past. Meanwhile, the Vanaratchi claims another victim.
3	"In the Shadows"	J.S. Nandhini	J.S. Nandhini	29 March 2024
During a search for an abducted man inside the forest, police sniffer dogs get scared and behave wildly. Rishi and the team consult an entomologist regarding webspinner insects. Meanwhile, a handmade Vanaratchi doll mysteriously ends up in the hands of a little girl.
4	"What Lies Beneath"	J.S. Nandhini	J.S. Nandhini	29 March 2024
Rishi and Ayyanar have a clash of opinions. Fear spreads throughout the village as more Vanaratchi sightings are reported. Sathya assigns beat officer Kathy to help Rishi and his team in the investigation.
5	"Something Wicked"	J.S. Nandhini	J.S. Nandhini	29 March 2024
Sathya and Irfan try to track down poachers who conduct illegal activities in the forest. A forest night vision camera captures a horrifying video. Villagers hold an urgent panchayat meeting. Rishi and his team arrest a suspect and question her.
6	"The Ties That Bind"	J.S. Nandhini	J.S. Nandhini	29 March 2024
Panic strikes when Kathy and another forest guard go missing in the forest during a routine night patrol. Rishi’s traumatic past with Viji is revealed. Meanwhile, a young village woman gets a visit from the Vanaratchi.
7	"Deliver Us from Evil"	J.S. Nandhini	J.S. Nandhini	29 March 2024
The exorcism of a Vanaratchi-possessed woman gets interrupted by a group of unruly villagers. While Rishi digs deep and studies the victimology, Chitra and Ayyanar lock horns and get into a heated argument.
8	"The Darkest Hour"	J.S. Nandhini	J.S. Nandhini	29 March 2024
Sathya and Irfan are abducted and tortured by poachers. While the rescue team searches for them in the forest, Rishi, Kathy, Ayyanar and Chitra conduct an investigation of their own to find the two officers before it’s too late.
9	"The Secret Cavern"	J.S. Nandhini	J.S. Nandhini	29 March 2024
Rishi, Ayyanar, Chitra and Sathya venture into a dark and mysterious cave to investigate a crime scene. The truth behind the tribal people’s deadly ritual is revealed. Kathy decides to confess her love to Rishi.
10	"Close Encounters"	J.S. Nandhini	J.S. Nandhini	29 March 2024
One major clue in the investigation leads Rishi to find shocking revelations and discoveries. The team realises that the lives of many innocent people are at stake if they don’t do something soon.

== Release ==
Inspector Rishi was released on 29 March 2024 on Amazon Prime Video along with dubbed versions in Hindi, Telugu, Malayalam, and Kannada languages.

== Reception ==
On the review aggregator website Rotten Tomatoes, 71% of 7 critics' reviews are positive, with an average rating of 5.3/10.

Saibal Chatterjee of NDTV stated "What Inspector Rishi does with great skill is probe the myths and ingrained belief systems that inevitably exist on the boundaries of a world of human greed and exploitation."

Bhuvanesh Chandar of The Hindu stated "Unlike anything seen in the Tamil horror space, the vanaratchi makes for a fascinating horror subject, and having such a unique spectre in a setting like a forest helps a horror series that consciously shies away from the routine genre tropes like jump scares and gore. But though horror fans may not have many complaints, Inspector Rishi isn’t quite the best investigative thriller out there."

Chirag Sehgal of News18 rated the series 3 stars out of 5 and wrote "The series plays out like a slow-burner getting us impatient at times, but the screenplay (although I could not see why it should not have been shorter) does effectively create an eerie atmosphere. And the jungle setting bathed in mist and mystery sends shivers down our spines."

Sonal Pandya for Times Now rated the series 3 out of 5 and wrote, "The dialogue is mostly expository, but it lays the groundwork for each episode."

Janani K for India Today wrote "‘Inspector Rishi’ fails in this aspect as the twists and turns remind us of many Tamil films, including ‘Whistle’. The show could have been a little more taut for it to have maximum impact."

Nandini Ramnath of Scroll.in stated, "Several characters are plagued by terrifying visions, which convince them that Vanaratachi is on the rampage, even as human villains do their work."

Aswin Devan of Cinema Express awarded 3 stars to the series and wrote that "The show follows the formula of a police procedural: expository table discussions about the case, mysteries being unravelled as a new mystery evolves, red herrings, and chase sequences. However, Inspector Rishi excels in depicting the complexities and inner turmoils of the characters beyond the apparent chills."
