= Poikkal Kudhirai (2022 film) =

2022 film directed by Santhosh P. Jayakumar

- Theatrical release poster
- Directed by: Santhosh P. Jayakumar
- Written by: Santhosh P. Jayakumar
- Produced by: S. Vinod Kumar
- Starring: Prabhu Deva; Shaam; Varalaxmi Sarathkumar; Raiza Wilson; Baby Aazhiya; Prakash Raj; John Kokken
- Cinematography: Ballu
- Edited by: Preethi Mohan
- Music by: D. Imman
- Production companies: Darkroom Pictures; Mini Studios
- Release date: 5 August 2022
- Running time: 122 minutes
- Country: India
- Language: Tamil

Poikkal Kuthirai (transl. Horse with fake legs) is a 2022 Indian Tamil-language action thriller film written and directed by Santhosh P. Jayakumar. It stars Prabhu Deva in the title role with Varalaxmi Sarathkumar, Raiza Wilson, Prakash Raj, Baby Aazhiya, and John Kokken in other roles with Shaam in a cameo appearance. The music was composed by D. Imman, and the cinematography and editing handled by Ballu and Preethi Mohan respectively. The title of the film was announced on 4 August 2021.

The film was released theatrically on 5 August 2022, and opened to positive reviews from critics and audiences.

== Plot ==
The film begins with Kathiravan stealing all his resident's water from the pipes to fill up his house with water for his daughter Magizh. He does this as Magizh wants to learn to swim, and after asking the councilor to build a swimming pool in the area, the councilor refused to build it and suggested to build one in Kathir's house. While travelling on the bus, a goon touches a little girl inappropriately; seeing this, Kathir fights the goon even though the former only has one leg. Kathir receives some compensation cash for losing his wife and leg, so he wants to spend it for Magizh's education, but Magizh argues and wants her dad to get a prosthetic leg.

During a dance performance on stage, Magizh faints and gets admitted to the hospital. The chief doctor says that Magizh has a heart problem and an operation has to be done. The doctor says it will cost 70 lakhs for the operation, and Kathir agrees. Kathir visits his father in jail to ask to reveal where the money he stole was hidden. His father claims he has no money but offers a solution to save Magizh. He suggests to kidnap a little girl who has a weatlthy background. Kathir refuses and scolds his father. He calls up friends but no one offers to help him. After that Kathir decided to follow his father's advice and kidnap RTR Companies owner Rudra's daughter.

Kathir, along with his friend Madan, did extensive research regarding the day-to-day activities of Rudra family. Finally, on the day of the planned kidnapping, he was caught by Rudra but still someone kidnapped her daughter. Kathir was beaten badly and was offered to be given 70 Lakhs for his daughter's treatment, if he finds Rudra's daughter. Soon Kathir starts searching and eventually finds a container where many girls were put to be trafficked.

Soon, it was found that Kathir's Daughter also got kidnapped. The kidnapper threatened Kathir and said to ask Rudra to pay 10 Crore. Kathir did as he was told. In the End, it was found out that it was Rudra's husband Deva who organised the kidnap and Madan was also involved in helping him. Deva wanted to become the Managing Director of RTR and he was the one who did all the illegal activities. He also committed that he also murdered Rudra's Father. Kathir finding out the truth, thrashed all the Goons but eventually finds himself in the Gunpoint.

Kathir then reveals that it was all his plan to catch Deva. Kathir was the one who sent Madan to Deva and make him operate the Plan. He knew that sequence will take place in this way, and thus he also stole Rudra's Watch to inform her about the address and also sent the Voice messages to expose Deva. As soon he completed, Rudra came there and shot Deva down with a Gun.

Few Months Later, it is revealed that Kathir came back to his Village and is living happily with his daughter. He reveals to Madan that the ASP will soon find out Deva's buried body and may search for Rudra. But he committed about leaving a clue, which would never let anyone reach Rudra, which surprises Madan.

== Cast ==
- Prabhu Deva as Kathiravan
- Prakash Raj as Kathiravan's father
- Varalaxmi Sarathkumar as Rudra
- Shaam as ACP (cameo appearance)
- Raiza Wilson as Gouri
- Baby Aazhiya as Magizh, Kathiravan's daughter
- John Kokken as Deva, Rudra's husband
- Bharath Raj as Aravind, Rudra's bodyguard
- Jagan as Madhan
- Chaams as Gouri's brother
- Thangadurai as Counselor
- TKR as Area Secretary
- Birla Bose as Hospital Supervisor
- Prashanth Rangaswamy as NGO Head
- M. J. Shriram as Shivasubramaniam (uncredited)

== Production ==
The film's title was announced on 4 August 2021. The film marks Prabhu Deva's 53rd film as an actor. His role was reported to be a one legged man avatar. For his role, the makers had used a real prosthetic leg and the actor had started practicing with one leg. On 5 August 2021, 50% of the shoot was complete. After 10 days, the makers had resumed the film's shooting in Chennai.

Actresses Varalaxmi Sarathkumar and Raiza Wilson were signed in to play the two female leads. Other actors like Prakash Raj and Jagan were signed on to play pivotal roles.

== Music ==
Poikkal Kudhirai

Soundtrack album by D. Imman
- Released: 3 August 2022
- Recorded: 2021–2022
- Genre: Feature film soundtrack
- Language: Tamil
- Label: MRT Music
- Producer: D. Imman

D. Imman chronology
My Dear Bootham (2022)	Poikkal Kudhirai (2022)	Captain (2022)

The music of the film is composed by D. Imman, in his third collaboration with Prabhu Deva, after Pon Manickavel and My Dear Bootham. All the song lyrics are written by Madhan Karky. The entire soundtrack album was released on 3 August 2022.

Track listing
No.	Title	Singer(s)	Length
1.	"Singleu (Version I)"	G V Prakash Kumar	3:29
2.	"Chellamey (Version I)"	Shreya Ghoshal	4:08
3.	"Kanneeraey"	Pradeep Kumar	3:59
4.	"Thadai Udayatha"	Yazin Nazir	4:18
5.	"Manniley"	Srinisha Jayaseelan	4:33
6.	"Saltless Tears"	Sathyaprakash Dharmar	4:03
7.	"Vazhi Ithuthaano"	Ashnaa Sasikaran	2:06
8.	"Chellamey (Version II)"	Sid Sriram	3:51
9.	"Singleu (Version II)"	Gana Balachandar, GV Prakash	4:27
Total length:			46:21

== Marketing ==
On 13 January 2022, the makers released a special glimpse of the film. The trailer of the film was released on 22 July 2022. A press meet of the film was held on 23 July 2022.

== Release ==
=== Theatrical ===
Initially, the film was expected to be released in the month of December, 2021. However, it was postponed. Finally, the film was released theatrically on 5 August 2022.

=== Home media ===
The satellite rights of the film is sold to Kalaignar TV, while the digital rights of the film is sold to Disney+ Hotstar.

== Reception ==
The film opened to positive reviews, with critics praising Prabhu Deva's performance.

Outlook India gave the film's rating 3 out of 5 stars and wrote "Santhosh Jayakumar's 'Poikkal Kuthirai' is a mixed bag. In other words, it is a film that works in parts." Thinkal Menon of OTT Play gave the film's rating 3 out of 5 stars and wrote "Poikkal Kuthirai is a one-time watch thriller with some engaging sequences. The performances of a few actors and unpredictable story progression make up for the flaws." Vignesh Madhu of Cinema Express gave the film 2 out of 5 stars, stating that "There are a lot of unanswered questions, and the film definitely has the potential for a sequel/prequel. It might even be a far superior piece of work if the makers opt for better writing choices and the rough edges in the making are polished better."

However,Maalai Malar Critic gave 3.25 out of 5 rating and noted that "The director can be commended for raising awareness about child trafficking for body parts.".Dinamalar critic gave 2.5 stars out of 5.Hindu Tamil Thisai critic wrote that "Enjoy the game."
