= Gange Baare Thunge Baare =

- Directed by: Sadhu Kokila
- Written by: Ranganath (dialogue)
- Screenplay by: Sadhu Kokila
- Story by: Ranganath
- Starring: Prajwal Devaraj; Sunaina; Gayathri
- Cinematography: Shekhar Chandra
- Edited by: Deepu S Kumar
- Music by: Sadhu Kokila
- Production company: Putthuru Sri Mahalingeshwara Creations
- Release date: 2 May 2008
- Country: India
- Language: Kannada

Gange Baare Thunge Baare (transl. Ganges River, Tunga River) is a 2008 Indian Kannada language romantic drama film directed by Sadhu Kokila and starring Prajwal Devaraj, Sunaina and Gayathri. The film's title is based on a song from Kindari Jogi (1989). This film marks the Kannada debut of both of the lead actresses.

== Cast ==
- Prajwal Devaraj as Harsha
- Sunaina as Ganga
- Gayathri as Thunga
- Srinath
- Ramesh Bhat
- Ramakrishna
- Bhavya as Harsha's mother
- Tulasi Shivamani
- G. K. Govinda Rao
- Bullet Prakash as Harsha's friend

== Production ==
The songs were shot in Greece, Thailand and the Alcazar Theatre in Malaysia.

== Soundtrack ==
The music was composed by Sadhu Kokila. The music was released under the Akshaya Audio label.

Track listing
No.	Title	Singer(s)	Length
1.	"Hoogalu Kelive"	Kunal Ganjawala, Nanditha	4:49
2.	"Iddad Iddang Heltini Keli"	Jassie Gift	4:40
3.	"Jaadu Jaadu"	Chaitra H. G., Sriraksha	5:05
4.	"Kannale Gundittu"	Gaurav Bangia, Anuradha Sriram	4:54
5.	"Nadiyaagi"	Chinmayi Sripaada, Udit Narayan	5:01
6.	"Onde Ondu Saari"	Rajesh Krishnan	3:00
Total length:			27:29

== Reception ==
=== Critical response ===
R. G. Vijayasarathy of IANS rated the film 2 1/2 out of 5 and wrote that "GBTB could have been a better offering with a good script and neat performances from its artists". A critic from Rediff.com rated the film two out of five stars and wrote that "All in Gange Baare Thunge Baare is an ordinary fare from a much acclaimed director". A critic from Chitraloka wrote that "Prajwal Devaraj's new film Gange Baare Thunge Baare is a youthful love triangle which is handled quite well with elan and intelligence. Actor and Director Sadhu Kokila has once again shown that he can handle any type of subjects for his direction and maintaining a good narrative is his strong point."
