= Chadarangam (TV series) =

Indian webseries by Raj Anantha on Zee5

- Poster
- Directed by: Raj Anantha
- Starring: Srikanth, Ravi Prakash, Sunaina
- Country of origin: India
- No. of seasons: 1
- No. of episodes: 9

Production
- Producer: Vishnu Manchu
- Cinematography: Runal Hattimattur
- Running time: 32-49 mins
- Production company: Zee Entertainment Enterprises

Original release
- Network: Zee5
- Release: 11 February 2020

Chadarangam is an Indian Telugu-language political thriller web series that streamed on Zee5. The series is written and directed by Raj Anantha and produced by Vishnu Manchu for 24 Frames Factory. The series has Srikanth, Ravi Prakash, Sunainaa, Jeeva, Chalapathi Rao and Nagineedu playing important roles.

== Cast ==
- Srikanth as Pemmasani Gangadhar Rao
- Ravi Prakash as Bapineedu
- Nuthikattu Trinetrudu as Gangadhar Rao's son
- Sunainaa as Kranthi
- Chalapathi Rao as Guru Murthy
- Jeeva as Yogeswar Rao
- Nagineedu as Erra Rama Krishna Rao
- Ramya Pasupuleti as Paro
- Kausalya as Bhavani, Gangadhar Rao's wife
- Kasi Viswanath
- Subhash Gupta as Rathore
- Jayasri Rachakonda as Vasundhara Dhar

== Episodes ==
No.	Title	Directed by	Written by	Original release date
1	"Let the game begin"	Raj Anantha	Raj Anantha / Vishnu Manchu	11 February 2020
2	"Preparations galore"	Raj Anantha	Raj Anantha / Vishnu Manchu	11 February 2020
3	"The truth unfolds"	Raj Anantha	Raj Anantha / Vishnu Manchu	11 February 2020
4	"The investigation begins"	Raj Anantha	Raj Anantha / Vishnu Manchu	11 February 2020
5	"Drugs vs Politics"	Raj Anantha	Raj Anantha / Vishnu Manchu	11 February 2020
6	"Boomerang"	Raj Anantha	Raj Anantha / Vishnu Manchu	11 February 2020
7	"When everything goes wrong"	Raj Anantha	Raj Anantha / Vishnu Manchu	11 February 2020
8	"Back to square one"	Raj Anantha	Raj Anantha / Vishnu Manchu	11 February 2020
9	"The raise of new era"	Raj Anantha	Raj Anantha / Vishnu Manchu	11 February 2020
