= Raiza Wilson =

Indian actress and model (born 1989)

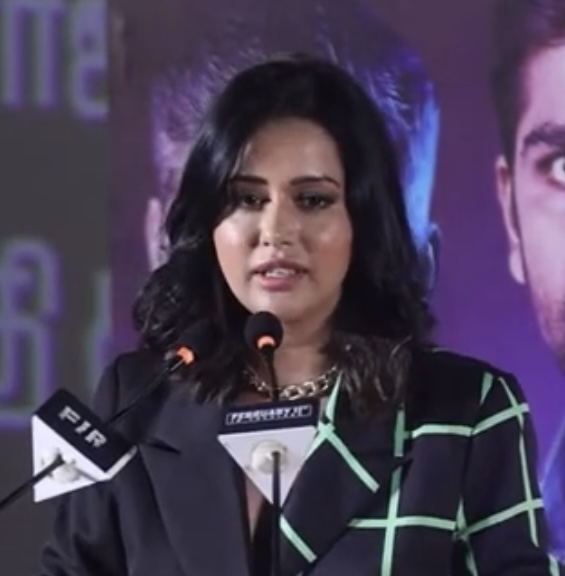
- Raiza in 2022
- Born: Raiza Wilson; 9 April 1989 (age 37); Ooty, Tamil Nadu, India
- Other name: Ranjitha
- Occupations: Actress; model
- Years active: 2017–present

Raiza Wilson (born 9 April 1989) is an Indian actress and model who appears in Tamil films. She rose to fame following her appearance in the Tamil reality TV show Bigg Boss. She won the Filmfare Award for Best Female Debut – South for her role as Sindhuja in Pyaar Prema Kaadhal. After her success she continued to act in films such as Dhanusu Raasi Neyargale (2019), Varmaa (2020), FIR (2022), Poikkal Kuthirai (2022) and Coffee With Kadhal (2022).

== Career ==
Wilson completed her schooling at Nazareth Convent Girls High School and then at JSS International School in Ooty, before moving on to college in Bangalore During her studies, she also worked as the PR, sales and marketing manager of Hint Lounge and Club in Bangalore. After gaining an interest in modelling, Wilson competed for the Miss India South 2011 title in late 2010, and was awarded the HICC Femina Miss South Beautiful Smile award during the competition. Wilson appeared in her first acting role in Tamil film Velaiilla Pattadhari 2 (2017), where she portrayed the personal assistant of Vasundhara Parameshwar, played by Kajol. Her screen time was very limited and therefore her role ended up being uncredited and minor.

In mid-2017, Wilson received widespread media attention in Tamil Nadu after signing on to appear on the Tamil reality TV show, Bigg Boss (Tamil) – Season 1, hosted by Kamal Haasan. She was evicted from the show after 63 days and in the process became the longest-lasting original female contestant. After her exit, Wilson stated that she felt "fortunate to become the part of the show" and "would cherish the memory forever". Wilson has acted in the lead role in Pyaar Prema Kaadhal, in which she pairs with another Bigg Boss contestant, Harish Kalyan.

After Pyaar Prema Kaadhal, Wilson was signed on to play an important role in Varmaa the Tamil remake of the Telugu film Arjun Reddy directed by Bala. However, this film was later redeveloped as Adithya Varma without Bala and Wilson's involvement. After from the success of Pyaar Prema Kaadhal, Yuvan Shankar Raja and Wilson are collaborating again in Yuvan's third production venture with PPK's co-director Mani Chandru and the film is titled as Alice and the first look was revealed on 14 January 2019.

== Filmography ==
- All films are in Tamil, unless otherwise noted.

Key
†	Denotes films that have not yet been released

Year	Film	Role	Notes	Ref.
2017	Velaiilla Pattadhari 2	Vasundhara's Personal Assistant	Uncredited role	
2018	Pyaar Prema Kaadhal	Sindhuja	Debut film	
2019	Dhanusu Raasi Neyargale	Bhargavi	Cameo appearance	
2020	Varmaa	Herself	Cameo appearance	
2022	FIR	Anisha Qureshi		
2022	Poikkal Kuthirai	Gouri		
2022	Coffee With Kadhal	Sara		
2023	Karungaapiyam	Meera		
2026	Mr. X	Nirmala alias Kamini		
2026	Idhayam Murali	Pregnant lady	Guest appearance	
TBA	The Chase†	TBA	Telugu film; Completed	

== Television ==
- Bigg Boss Tamil 1 as Contestant (Evicted day 63)
- Bigg Boss Tamil 2 as Guest appearance
- Genes Season 2 as Contestant

== Awards and nominations ==
Film	Award	Category	Result
Pyaar Prema Kaadhal	Ananda Vikatan Cinema Awards	Best Debut Actress	Won
Pyaar Prema Kaadhal	BOFTA Galatta Debut Awards	Best Debut Actress-People's Choice	Won
Pyaar Prema Kaadhal	JFW Awards	Best Actress in a Debut Role	Won
Pyaar Prema Kaadhal	Edison Awards	Best Debut Actress	Won
Pyaar Prema Kaadhal	8th SIIMA Awards	Best Debut Actress	Won
Pyaar Prema Kaadhal	66th Filmfare Awards South	Best Debutant Actress	Won
FIR	68th Filmfare Awards South	Best Supporting Actress	Nominated
