= Sunaina =

Indian actress

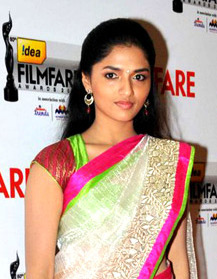
- Sunaina in 2013
- Born: Sunaina Yella; 17 April 1989 (age 37); Nagpur, Maharashtra, India
- Occupations: Actress, model
- Years active: 1989–present

Sunaina Yella (born 17 April 1989), known professionally as Sunaina, is an Indian actress and model who predominantly works in Tamil and Telugu films. She debuted in Telugu with Kumar Vs Kumari (2005) and in Tamil with Kadhalil Vizhunthen (2008). She has since starred in the films Vamsam (2010), Neerparavai (2012), Trip and Raja Raja Chora (both 2021), and the television shows Nila Nila Odi Vaa (2018), Chadarangam (2020) and Inspector Rishi (2024).

== Early life and career ==
Sunaina was born in April 1989 in Nagpur, India into a Telugu family. She was raised in Nagpur and the family later moved to Hyderabad.

She had her first screen appearance in Kumar Vs Kumari (2005), a Telugu film. Her next film 10th Class (2006) was her first breakthrough in Telugu cinema. She next made her Malayalam and Kannada cinema debut in Best Friends (2006) and Gange Baare Thunge Baare (2008) respectively.

She rose to fame starring with Nakul in Kadhalil Vizhunthen (2008) which was her Tamil début film. Prior to that, she shot for a short scene in Sivaji (2007), which did not make the final cut. She later starred in Vamsam (2010) in which she appeared as a beautiful village girl and did very well, and continued with performance oriented films where she secured her first Filmfare nomination for Neerparavai (2012). Her performance was critically praised and she was nominated for the Filmfare Award for Best Actress – Tamil.

After that she appeared in films like Samar (2013), Vanmam (2014) and also gave a guest appearance opposite Vijay in Theri (2016). She then appeared in Nambiyaar (2016), Kavalai Vendam (2016), Thondan (2017). In 2018, she acted in the drama film Kaali starring Vijay Antony and Anjali. Next, she appeared in Nila Nila Odi Vaa, Viu original romantic thriller series that released in September 2018. She has also done Sillu Karupatti (2019), and comedian Yogi Babu’s film titled Trip (2021).

Raja Raja Chora (2021) was considered to be her comeback in Telugu cinema after 10th Class (2006). She had also appeared in the Amazon Prime Video series Inspector Rishi, released in 2024.

== Filmography ==
Key
†	Denotes films that have not yet been released

=== Films ===
Year	Film	Role	Language	Notes
2005	Kumar Vs Kumari	Sudha	Telugu	
2006	Something Special	Mahi	Telugu	
2006	10th Class	Sandhya	Telugu	
2006	Best Friends	Kavya	Malayalam	
2007	Pagale Vennela	Swapna	Telugu	credited as Mythili
2007	Missing	Kavya	Telugu	
2008	Gange Baare Thunge Baare	Ganga	Kannada	
2008	Kadhalil Vizhunthen	Meera	Tamil	
2009	Maasilamani	Divya Ramanathan	Tamil	
2010	Yaathumagi	Anna Lakshmi	Tamil	
2010	Vamsam	Malar Kodi	Tamil	
2012	Pandi Oliperukki Nilayam	Valar Mathi	Tamil	
2012	Thiruthani	Sugeesha	Tamil	
2012	Neerparavai	Esther	Tamil	Nominated, Filmfare Award for Best Actress – Tamil
2013	Samar	Roopa	Tamil	
2014	Vanmam	Vadhana	Tamil	
2016	Theri	Bride	Tamil	Cameo appearance
2016	Nambiar	Saroja Devi	Tamil	
2016	Kavalai Vendam	Deepa	Tamil	
2017	Thondan	Bagalamugi	Tamil	
2017	Pelliki Mundu Prema Katha	Anu	Telugu	
2018	Kaali	Poo Mayilu (Parvathy)	Tamil	
2019	Enai Noki Paayum Thota	Mythili	Tamil	
2019	Sillu Karupatti	Amudhini	Tamil	
2021	Trip	Lidi (Paapi)	Tamil	
2021	Raja Raja Chora	Vidya	Telugu	
2022	Estate	Reba	Tamil	
2022	Laththi	Kavitha Muruganantham	Tamil	
2023	Regina	Regina	Tamil	
2024	Rocket Driver	Kamala	Tamil	
2025	Kuberaa	Shilpa	Telugu	
2025	Kuberaa	Deepa	Tamil	

=== Television ===
Year	Title	Role	Language	Network	Notes	Ref.
2018	Nila Nila Odi Vaa	Nila	Tamil	Viu		
2019	High Priestess	Radhika	Telugu	ZEE5	Appears in the episode "Friends"	
2019	Fingertip	Rekha	Tamil	ZEE5	Season 1; Appears under segment "Greed".	
2020	Chadarangam	Kranthi	Telugu	ZEE5		
2022	Meet Cute	Kiran	Telugu	SonyLIV	Appears under segment "Ex-Girlfriend"	
2024	Inspector Rishi	Kathryn "Kathy"	Tamil	Amazon Prime Video		

== Personal life ==
In June 2024, Sunaina announced her engagement through a social-media post showing her holding a man's hand with a lock emoji. Media outlets subsequently identified the fiancé as Emirati content creator Khalid Al Ameri after both shared similar photographs featuring engagement rings. In December 2025, Al Ameri publicly confirmed their relationship by posting a birthday photo featuring the couple together.
