= Manu Anand =

Indian film director

- Born: 1 January 1970 (age 56)
- Occupations: Film director, screenwriter
- Years active: 2019-present

Manu Anand is an Indian film director and screenwriter who works in the Tamil film industry. He is known for directing action thriller films.

== Career ==
Manu Anand started as an assistant director for Gautham Vasudev Menon in Neethaane En Ponvasantham (2012). He got ready to make his feature film debut in 2019. He made his debut with FIR (2022), which became a critical and commercial success. In 2026, he directed the spy thriller film Mr. X (2026). He compared the film to Dhurandhar as both were based on Indian spies but later redacted his statement.

== Filmography ==
Year	Title	Credited as		Notes
Year	Title	Director	Writer	Notes
2022	FIR	Yes	Yes	
2025	Aaryan	No	Yes	
2026	Mr. X	Yes	Yes	
