= Estate (2022 film) =

2022 horror drama film

- Promotional poster
- Directed by: Karthik Vilvakrish
- Produced by: Venkatesh Vellineni
- Starring: Ashok Selvan; Kalaiyarasan; Sunaina; Remya Nambeesan
- Cinematography: Ashwanth Rajan Dayal
- Edited by: Prakash Karunanithi
- Music by: Guna Balasubramanian
- Production company: Divine Productions
- Release date: 9 December 2022
- Country: India
- Language: Tamil

Estate is a 2022 Indian Tamil-language horror drama film directed by Karthik Vilvakrish. The film stars Kalaiyarasan, Sunaina and Remya Nambeesan in the lead roles, with Ashok Selvan in an extended cameo. It was released on 9 December 2022.

== Plot ==
- Durga Venugopal, a journalist in an English media house decides to break into the infamous Covelon Estate with the help of Michael Devaraj. Sub-Inspector Sasi and Dr. Reba enter the estate on the same night.
- The crew went inside the estate where they heard sounds. When they reached the entrance of the house, they saw a person attacking them. In the meantime, the cop and doctor inside were frightened by a small girl. Michael and Durga were separated in the house where they noticed a bloody stain.

== Cast ==
- Ashok Selvan as Micheal Devraj (extended cameo appearance)
- Kalaiyarasan as Sasi
- Sunaina as Reba
- Remya Nambeesan as Durga Venugopal
- Daniel Annie Pope
- Kiran Konda
- Vijay Vilvakrish
- Raja Divagar
- Arun
- Radhakrishnan

== Production ==
The film was shot completely in Yercaud in an only-night shoot schedule, with scenes filmed in abandoned vintage properties.

== Release and reception ==
The film was released across Tamil Nadu on 9 December 2022. A critic from Times of India noted it was "a well-staged paranormal thriller let down by a poorly-written climax", adding that "Karthik V gets most of it right and manages to give us an immersive theatrical experience". A critic from Thanthi TV also gave the film a positive review.
