= Abby V =

- Born: November 24
- Genres: Various
- Occupation: Singer
- Years active: 2020–present

Abby V is a Canadian singer, songwriter, playback singer, composer, and music producer from, best known for his Instagram and YouTube videos in which he performs both Carnatic and Hindustanti ragas and several Tamil, Hindi, Malayalam, Kannada, and Telugu film songs. He gained widespread recognition in 2020 with the video "73 Ragas with Abby" that went viral on social media and garnered the attention of prominent classical vocalists and film playback singers from the India, many of whom have also collaborated in Abby's videos. He debuted as a playback singer in Indian cinema in Indian 2 in the song "Neelorpam" composed by Anirudh Ravichander. His album Aarambh was nominated for the 2025 Juno Award for Global Music Album of the Year.

== Biography ==
Abby V was born and raised in Toronto and graduated from University of Toronto's Rotman School of Management. He has trained in both western music and classical Indian music - the latter being under the guidance of teachers Smt. Ranjani-Gayatri and Smt. Raji Gopalakrishnan. Abby V also holds degrees in vocal music performance and production technology from the Metalworks Institute. There, he was a recipient of the Institute's Slaight Scholarship.

Abby V first gained international recognition in 2015 when he won the televised reality singing competition, Astro International Superstar. This singing competition featured participants from around the world. In 2019, Abby V debuted his solo album, First of All, that featured eight original songs in various languages including English, Hindi and Tamil. The following year, in 2020, Abby V solidified his place in the music world with the viral video "73 Ragas with Abby". He followed up this track with several other videos and reels on his social media accounts that continued to gain him followers, global visibility, and success as a singer.

In November 2023, Abby V released his second album, Aarambh, with three-time Grammy Award winner and four-time Grammy nominee, Ricky Kej. The album featured collaborations with various Indian musicians and earned a Juno Award nomination for best album.

Abby V made his debut as a playback singer in Indian cinema in 2024 when composer Anirudh Ravichander utilized him as a playback singer for the song "Neelorpam" from the film Indian 2. In 2025, Abby V gained greater prominence as a singer with the lead track "Brahmakalasha" from Kantara: Chapter 1. Each version of the track received 100K+ views within a day of release. He shared in an interview that the Kantara team had directly contacted and hired him and didn't even require an audition. Abby V performed for Sai Baba's 100th celebration in Puttaparthi in the presence of Bollywood actress Aishwarya Rai.

== Playback Songs ==
- "Neelorpam" - Indian 2 (2024) - Tamil, Telugu, Hindi
- "Brahmakalsha" - Kantara: Chapter 1 (2025) - Kannada, Tamil, Telugu, Hindi
- "Dhochaave Nanne" - Premante (2025) - Telugu
- "Azhagiyaley" - Aaryan (2025) - Tamil
- "Parichayamey" - Aaryan (2025) - Telugu
- "Yeno Onthara" - The_Devil_(2025_film) - Kannada
- "Majako Mallika" - Kattalan (2026) - Hindi
- "Shubh Din Aayo" - Krishnavataram_Part_1:_The_Heart_(Hridayam) (2026) - Hindi
- "Jagava Kayo Devanu" - Devi Mahathme (2026) - Kannada

== Awards and Titles ==
- Winner of Astro International Superstar Singing Reality Show (2016)
- Ron Lenyk Inspiring Youth Art Award, Living Arts Centre (2017)
- MARTYs Best Vocalist Award, 2018
- Juno Awards Nominee for "Global Music Album of the Year" for "AARAMBH" (2025)

- Best Playback Singer for "Brahmakalasha" Kantara:_Chapter_1 from 7th year Chandanavana Film Critics Academy Award 2026
- Best Playback Singer for Brahmakalasha Kantara:_Chapter_1 at Chittara Star Awards 2026
- Best Playback Singer for Brahmakalasha Kantara:_Chapter_1 at Prajavani Kannada Cinema Awards 2026
