= Mr. X (2026 film) =

2026 Indian film

- Theatrical release poster
- Directed by: Manu Anand
- Written by: Manu Anand
- Produced by: S. Lakshman Kumar; Vineet Jain
- Starring: Arya; Gautham Ram Karthik; R. Sarathkumar; Manju Warrier
- Cinematography: Arul Vincent
- Edited by: Prasanna GK
- Music by: Dhibu Ninan Thomas
- Production companies: Prince Pictures; Maverik Movies Pvt Ltd
- Release date: 17 April 2026
- Running time: 153 minutes
- Country: India
- Language: Tamil

Mr. X is a 2026 Indian Tamil-language spy action thriller film written and directed by Manu Anand and produced by S. Lakshman Kumar and Vineet Jain of Prince Pictures and Maverik Movies Pvt Ltd. The film stars Arya, Gautham Ram Karthik, R. Sarathkumar and Manju Warrier. It has music composed by Dhibu Ninan Thomas, cinematography by Arul Vincent, and editing by Prasanna GK.

Mr. X was shot between 2023 and June 2024. The film was theatrically released on 17 April 2026. It received mixed reviews from critics and performed poorly at the box office.

== Plot ==
The R&AW agent Gautham Surya Pratap and his team deal with a high-stakes national security threat. A highly radioactive nuclear device along with Gautham's father, veteran R&AW agent Parameshwar, is abducted by the Lone Wolf gang, led by R&AW double-agent Amaran Chakaravarthi. Gautham and the R&AW chief Indira Varma set to retrieve the device and his father that will help him find his family and take down Amaran and Lone Wolf gang in a wider espionage conspiracy.

== Cast ==
- Arya as Gautham Surya Pratap / "Businessman"
- Gautham Ram Karthik as Amaran Chakaravarthi / "Lone Wolf"
- R. Sarathkumar as Parameshwar Surya Pratap / "Mr. X" / Rana
- Manju Warrier as Indira Varma
- Athulya Ravi as Aditi Surya Pratap / Vedha Narayanan
- Anagha as Dr. Keerthana
- Raiza Wilson as Nirmala alias Kamini
- Jayaprakash as Vamanamoorthy
- Kaali Venkat as Ponnuswamy
- Praveen Muthurangan as Yogi
- Tara Amala Joseph as Sheeba
- Sanjana Singh as Jasleen Kaur
- Devadarshini as Amaran's mother
- Stunt Silva as Sampath
- Gautham Vasudev Menon as narrator (voice)

== Production ==
The film was officially announced in May 2023, with a motion poster released by the makers. In June 2023, actress Manju Warrier was confirmed to have joined the cast. Principal photography began in 2023, and was completed in June 2024. Director Manu Anand stated during the film's promotion that the story drew inspiration from real incidents.

== Music ==
The film's soundtrack and background score are composed by Dhibu Ninan Thomas. The first single, "Haiyodi", was released on 27 February 2025.

No.	Title	Lyrics	Singer(s)	Length
1.	"Haiyodi"	Krithika Nelson	Kapil Kapilan
2.	"X Force"		Amogh Balaji, Rabbit Mac
3.	"Agam"		Dhibu Ninan Thomas

== Release ==
=== Theatrical ===
Mr. X was released in theatres on 17 April 2026. It was reported that the film would be released in multiple languages, including dubbed versions.

=== Home media ===
The film began streaming on JioHotstar from 14 May 2026.

== Reception ==
News Today gave the film a positive review, saying, "What stands out in Mr X is its scale and intent. The film moves briskly through twists, betrayals, and action set pieces, ensuring there is rarely a dull moment". Janani K of India Today gave a more mixed review, saying that despite trying to emulate the James Bond, Mission Impossible and Bourne series, it "ends up being a spoof of all three". Abhinav Subramanian of The Times of India wrote, "Mr. X lands its punches in bursts, even if it never quite strings them into a combo. Watchable once, thinkable zero times after". Avinash Ramachandran of Cinema Express wrote, "Even if the film doesn't always hit the right notes, it never shies away from going all out with its imagination and creativity, and manages to entertain as long as we, just like the makers, don't take the film too seriously".
