= Malini Jeevarathnam =

Indian actress

- Born: Paramakudi, Tamil Nadu, India
- Occupations: Actor, film director
- Years active: 2017–present

Malini Jeevarathnam is an Indian documentary film director, who primarily works in Tamil Nadu. They are known for their acting and documentary work on LGBTQ+ issues.

== Personal life ==
Malini Jeevarathnam was born in Paramakudi, Tamil Nadu Ramanathapuram district. They studied Master's in Media Arts from Loyola College, Chennai and assisted Pa. Ranjith on his movie Madras, and in 2016 film Aruvi, directed by Arun Prabu Purushothaman.

== Career ==
Inspired by Ranjith's progressive ideas and the support from the film crew, they decided to come out as a lesbian, a decision that profoundly influenced their personal and professional life. They have done multiple short films around queerness in Tamil.

=== Ladies and Gentlewomen ===
With this motivation, they made their directorial debut with the 2017 documentary Ladies and Gentlewomen which talked about love, life, and suicide among lesbians. This venture was supported and produced by Pa. Ranjith.

This documentary has received Best Documentary awards at the Norway Tamil Film Festival, nominated for an award at the Pune International Queer Film Festival Out & Loud, and received many other accolades around the world.

=== Why So Straight? ===
Why So Straight is a short film that briefly explores the life of a queer artist named Ameya, from Pune. Despite its brevity, the film excels in instilling hope and showcasing sensitivity to uniqueness and gender fluidity. Balancing love, celebration, and acceptance with pain, rage, and estrangement, it offers a nuanced portrayal of queer experiences.

The film premiered at Medai Stage in Chennai earlier this year during a private event organized by filmmaker and producer Pa Ranjith.

In 2023, they had also launched their production house Veytikaari Productions. In the same year, they also worked as a script consultant for Kaadhal Embadhu Podhu Udamai which talks about a lesbian relationships.

== Activism ==
They have been a vocal activist in Chennai, Tamil Nadu and Kerala queer activism spaces. They identify as gender fluid, non-binary person, and prefer they/them pronouns. They have been part of multiple protests and panels in and around the country.

== Filmography ==
=== Actor ===
List of actor credits for Malini Jeevarathnam
Year	Film	Role	Language	Notes
2024	Inspector Rishi	Chithra	Tamil	Web Series
2024	Love And Let Love		No Dialogue	Short Film

=== As director ===
Year	Film	Notes
2017	Ladies and Gentlewomen	Documentary Films about love, life, and suicide among lesbians.
2022	Why So Straight?	The story of a queer artist called Ameya Hemmadi.
2024	Kaadhal Embadhu Podhu Udamai	Worked as a Script Consultant
