= FIR (2022 film) =

2022 Indian Tamil-language action thriller film

- Theatrical release poster
- Directed by: Manu Anand
- Written by: Manu Anand; Divyanka Anand Shankar
- Produced by: Vishnu Vishal; Shubhra; Aryan Ramesh
- Starring: Vishnu Vishal; Gautham Vasudev Menon; Reba Monica John; Manjima Mohan; Raiza Wilson
- Cinematography: Arul Vincent
- Edited by: Prasanna GK
- Music by: Ashwath
- Production company: Vishnu Vishal Studioz
- Distributed by: Red Giant Movies
- Release date: 11 February 2022
- Running time: 155 minutes
- Country: India
- Language: Tamil
- Box office: est.₹24 crore

FIR is a 2022 Indian Tamil-language action thriller film written and directed by Manu Anand in his directorial debut and produced by Vishnu Vishal, Shubhra and Aryan Ramesh under the banner of Vishnu Vishal Studioz. The film features Vishnu Vishal, Gautham Vasudev Menon, Manjima Mohan, Reba Monica John, Raiza Wilson and Gaurav Narayanan.

The music is composed by Ashwath and editing by Prasanna GK. The film was released theatrically on 11 February 2022, where it received positive reviews from critics and became a critical and commercial success.

== Plot ==
Irfan Ahmed, an IIT Madras gold medalist based in Triplicane, Chennai, lives with his friends and mother, Praveena Begum, a Sub-Inspector of Police. He is in a relationship with Archana Krishnamoorthy, who is doing her Ph.D. in Delhi, and also befriends a junior lawyer, Prathana Raman. Irfan unsuccessfully attends job interviews, while working part-time with a perfume factory. Tired of being questioned on his religious beliefs during interviews, Irfan decides to join a full-time perfume business, which is headed by Perumal and his son, Karthikeyan. He visits various locations in the country to shop for chemicals. On his way back from Hyderabad, Irfan loses his cellphone.

Frustrated that he might miss his flight to Chennai, Irfan mistakenly threatens the airport officials that he will bomb Hyderabad, which leads to his arrest, but is released and reaches Chennai. Later, a bomb explodes at the same airport, killing many people. The next day, Irfan's phone is found at the bomb blast site, and Irfan is arrested, yet again. He is detained under the orders of NIA advisor, Ajay Dewan. He is interrogated by NIA officer, Anisha Qureshi, and low-ranking police officer, Gunashekhar. Irfan is believed to be the most wanted terrorist, dubbed Abu Bakkar Abdullah. As a result, he is branded as a terrorist and portrayed as the evil incarnate by the media, and undergoes torture under police custody.

Feeling sorry for Irfan, Prathana decides to represent him and brings Praveena Begum to see him. However, they are denied to visit Irfan. Being an asthmatic patient, Praveena collapses from an attack, due to the humiliation stemming from the public prosecution. Irfan is granted to visit his mother in the hospital, under extreme surveillance of the police. However, he escapes from police custody and finds that Praveena Begum has died, leaving Irfan devastated and escaping from the hospital, where he is met by Dr. Zazi's son Riyaz, who convinces and motivates Irfan to create a sarin gas, to pull off a terrorist attack. Irfan does so, which is eventually tested on Dr. Zazi, when he visits the factory and is shocked to see what was going on.

Anisha reaches there and surrounds Irfan and Riyaz, but is stabbed by Karthikeyan, who is revealed to be the real Abu Bakkar Abdullah. When the bomb is activated, Abu Bakkar activates the bomb and tells his henchman to kill Irfan, as he has no use of him, but Irfan overpowers and kills the henchman, where it is revealed that Irfan is actually an undercover NIA agent and waited for years to draw Abu Bakkar out of hiding. Archana, who is also an undercover NIA agent, arrives at the factory and finishes off Riyaz, while Irfan kills Abu Bakkar. Gunashekhar and the cops surround the factory, under the orders of Ajay Dewan. After getting permission from the Defense Minister, a government-sanctioned drone, fires a military missile to the factory.

Archana tries to persuade Irfan to leave the factory, as it is about to be destroyed. However, he refuses, as he wants to stop the activation of the sarin gas. The factory is destroyed by the missile, seemingly killing Irfan. Ajay Dewan is congratulated for preventing the gas attack. It is revealed that the whole operation was planned by Ajay Dewan, which was only known to very few people. He found an officer with a chemical engineering background and named him Irfan Ahmed, erasing his past life. With the help of Archana, Irfan eliminates Abu Bakkar's chemical engineer Ashraf, in order to lure Abu Bakkar to India. It is also revealed that Irfan actually escaped from the missile strike of the factory and is on another mission, where his real name is revealed to be Faizal Ibrahim Raiz (FIR).

== Cast ==
- Vishnu Vishal as Irfan Ahmed / Faizal Ibrahim Raiz (FIR) Chemical Engineer
- Gautham Vasudev Menon as Ajay Dewan
- Manjima Mohan as Prathana Raman
- Raiza Wilson as Anisha Qureshi
- Reba Monica John as Archana Krishnamoorthy
- Parvathi T. as Praveena Begum
- Gaurav Narayanan as Suraj
- Ram C as Karthikeyan / Abu Bakkar Abdullah
- Abishek Joseph George as Riyaz
- Jay Adithya as Ajay Dewan's son
- Chandru BCS as Aravind Guruswamy
- Praveen Muthurangan as Gunashekar Kolliyapan
- R. N. R. Manohar as Perumal, Karthikeyan’s father
- Prashanth Rangaswamy as Thirukumaram aka @itiskumaran
- Vignesh Vijayan as Prasad, Irfan’s friend
- R. Shyam as Vivek Kumar, Irfan’s friend
- Amaan as Dr. Ahmed Zazi

== Production ==
The film started with its principal photography in October 2019 and the shooting for the same started in December 2019. The shooting was wrapped up by February 2021 and moved into post-production then. It was banned in Malaysia, Qatar and Kuwait.

== Music ==
The songs of the film are composed by Ashwath. The audio rights of the film were acquired by VV Studioz and Divo Music.

Tracklist
| No. | Title | Lyrics | Singer(s) | Length |
|---|---|---|---|---|
| 1. | "Vizhiyile" | Bagavathy PK | Sathyaprakash, Mahita Mahesh, Suganth Shekar | 4:34 |
| 2. | "Payanam" | Bagavathy PK | Abhay Jodhpurkar | 4:38 |
| 3. | "Anthem of Harmony" | Mashook Rahman | Naresh Iyer | 3:05 |
| 4. | "FIR – Theme Song" | L Karunakaran, Christopher Stanley, Mobin | Silambarasan TR, Christopher Stanley | 4:00 |
| 5. | "Yah Allah" | Mashook Rahman | Deepak Blue, Vishnu Vishal, Sugandh Shekar | 3:50 |
| Total length: | | | | 20:04 |

== Release ==
=== Theatrical ===
The film was released theatrically on 11 February 2022.

=== Home media ===
The digital streaming and satellite rights were bought by Amazon Prime Video and Vijay TV.

== Reception ==
=== Critical response ===
M Suganth of The Times of India gave 3 out of 5 and wrote "the rapid editing (GK Prasanna) and the pulsating background score (by Ashwath) ensure that the film manages to move at a breakneck pace, and manage to stop us from thinking about logic and help the film keep us engaged." Manoj Kumar R of The Indian Express gave 3.5 out of 5 stars and wrote "FIR lacks the maturity of Kamal Haasan's Vishwaroopam. The lack of nuance in properly establishing the islamophobia, misunderstanding suffered by different communities and politics behind intensifying polarization have been left out from the movie for the convenience of the narration."

Srinivasan Ramanujam of The Hindu wrote after reviewing the film that "Despite being a thriller, FIR also manages to throw in some powerful moments, but could have done well to avoid some unnecessary over the-top elements that seem to dilute its core premise in the first place." Navein Darshan of Cinema Express gave 3.5 out of 5 stars and wrote "Debutant Manu Anand sets the bar so high with a lot of interesting elements like these that when inconveniences come in the form of forced comedy and loopholes it almost feels criminal. I would hate to analyse a film based on the pre and post-intermission halves, but in FIR, the difference is so jarring that you can't help yourself from missing the highly tactful writing of the first half in the latter."

Haricharan Pudipeddi of Hindustan Times wrote "FIR has some smart, well-written twists for a thriller. As the twists untangle themselves in the end, the film feels more complete." Ashameera Aiyappan of Firstpost gave the film 2.5 out of 5 and stated "FIR has its heart in the right place. And the questions it asks are incredibly pertinent. Irfan begins to retaliate only when he is forced to the corner. And when he says that he is done trusting the system and its judiciary -- the emotion hits home. After all, we live in dystopian times where minorities are consistently pushed away from the doors of justice. But good intentions don’t always make for good cinema."

=== Box office ===
According to reports from Times of India, the film had a biggest opening and grossed more than 8 crores at the Tamil Nadu box office. The film grossed over ₹24 crore (equivalent to ₹28 crore or US$3.0 million in 2026).
