= Ladies and Gentlewomen =

Ladies And Gentlewomen
- Directed by: Malini Jeevarathnam
- Produced by: Pa. Ranjith's Neelam Productions
- Cinematography: Praveen Kumar, Jai Shankar, Arun, Siddharth Krishnamurthy, Vipin Waghmare, Satish Meiyappan, Ramesh
- Edited by: B.Pravin Baaskar, G.A Gowtham
- Music by: Justin Prabhakaran
- Release dates: January 2017 (Chennai Rainbow); 21 January 2018 (India)
- Running time: 47 minutes
- Country: India
- Languages: English, Tamil

Ladies and Gentlewomen is a Tamil language, Indian documentary by Malini Jeevarathnam and produced by Pa. Ranjith. It is about love, life, and suicide among lesbians. The documentary also features a "Lesbian Anthem" for which the music was composed by Justin Prabhakaran and lyrics were penned by Kutti Revathi and Damayanthi.

== Synopsis ==
Ladies and Gentlewomen is a documentary that examines lesbianism, body politics, relationships, and the social stigma associated with lesbian identities. The film addresses social attitudes toward lesbianism and the experiences of individuals who face rejection because of their sexual orientation. It also discusses cases of suicide in the context of social rejection and examines the responses of society to these issues.

" Why the hell, do you care about Someone's love When you dont care a speck about someone's suicide?"

The documentary narrates the tale of Tija and Bija, a lesbian couple believed to be from Rajasthan, and is also about a Tamil folktale that features the lovers Pappathi and Karupaayi. It also features different perspectives on lesbian women from LGBTQ activists, journalists, lawyers and common people. She says her main aim is to increase the visibility of queer women and to save lesbian women from committing suicide or them being a subject of honor killings.

== Production ==
Director claimed the research for the film took her one-and-a-half years, and the movie took three years to complete altogether. Her main intention, she claims, is to bring focus to the deaths of LGBT persons and their sufferings. As a part of the research, Malini met around 85 women from the Queer community. Many were not ready to talk about their sexuality in front of the camera. The film premiered at the Chennai Rainbow Film Festival in Chennai on 8 January 2017.

== Awards and nominations ==
This documentary has received Best Documentary awards at the Norway Tamil Film Festival, nominated for an award at the Pune International Queer Film Festival Out & Loud, and received many other accolades around the world. It has been screening at 11 different international film festivals and has won the Best Documentary award at three of them. In India, the movie has been screen at Chennai International Queer Film Festival, Bangalore Queer Film Festival, Hyderabad chapter of Queer Campus Bangalore and received rave reviews in many other cities.

2017 Chennai Rainbow Film Festival

- Won: Best Documentary

2017 Norway Tamil Film Festival

- Won: Best Documentary
