= Pyaar Prema Kaadhal =

2018 film directed by Elan

- Theatrical release poster
- Directed by: Elan
- Written by: Elan
- Produced by: Yuvan Shankar Raja; S. N. Rajarajan; Irfaan Malik
- Starring: Harish Kalyan; Raiza Wilson
- Cinematography: Raja Bhattacharjee
- Edited by: Manikumaran Shankara
- Music by: Yuvan Shankar Raja
- Production companies: YSR Films; K Productions
- Distributed by: Trident Arts
- Release date: 10 August 2018
- Running time: 122 minutes
- Country: India
- Language: Tamil

Pyaar Prema Kaadhal (transl. Love, Love, Love) is a 2018 Indian Tamil-language romantic comedy film directed by Elan in his directorial debut, and produced by Yuvan Shankar Raja, under the banner YSR Films, who also composed music for the film, and co-produced by S. N. Rajarajan under K Productions. The film stars Harish Kalyan and Raiza Wilson, with Anand Babu, Rekha, Pandian, Munishkanth and Subbu Panchu appear in supporting roles.

The film's cinematography was handled by Raja Bhattacharjee, with editing done by S. Manikumaran. The film began production in late 2017 and was completed in May 2018. It was released on 10 August 2018, to a positive response from the audience as well as critics, and became a commercial success. The film won two Filmfare Awards South and two SIIMA Awards, including the Best Debut Actress Award for Raiza in both ceremonies. It was remade in Telugu as Urvasivo Rakshasivo (2022).

A spiritual successor titled Pyaar Prema Kalyanam also directed by Elan and starring himself was released in 2026.

== Plot ==
Sree is an innocent and fun-loving IT employee from Chennai who lives with his parents. He has a crush on Sindhuja, an independent modern-day girl who works in the office opposite his. Sindhuja eventually joins Sree's office and invites him to hang out with her at the club, to which Sree happily agrees. At the club, he realises that, Sindhu drinks alcohol, swears freely, and is a complete party girl. He discovers that Sindhu doesn't know her own birthday because only her mother knew it and her mother died when she was very young. Over time, they become good friends, and he falls in love with her.

One day, the duo gets stuck in an elevator and ends up kissing instinctively. Sindhuja brings Sree home, and they have sex, after which Sree confesses his love for Sindhuja. To his shock, she rejects him, saying that they are only good friends and insists that she does not love him. She refers to their sex as a casual indulgence, whereupon Sree leaves her house in complete disgust. Sindhuja constantly tries to pacify him and Sree finally gives in, agreeing to continue being friends with her and begin to hang out like before. At a party, Sindhu tries to get intimate with a drunk Sree, but he gets upset and shouts at her for merely using him and criticises her character. He also reveals to everyone that he had sex with Sindhuja, making her angry. Sindhu confesses that now she also loves Sree but is disheartened by his behaviour and mindset, thus ending the party on an unpleasant note.

Sree seeks the help of the local tailor Thangaraj and his colleague Satish and attempts to reconcile with Sindhuja. He joins the dance classes conducted by Sindhu's father and eventually they patch up. As per Sindhu's wish, they decide to begin a life in relationship without the knowledge of Sree's parents since, they would clearly disapprove of the idea. Sree makes a plan for his daily routine, to keep his parents oblivious to his relationship and moves into a rented house near his home with Sindhu. While Sindhu starts becoming slightly aggressive, Sree continues to steer the boat of their relationship. One night, when Sindhu is moody and irksome, Sree takes her out and reveals to her that it is her birthday and tells her that he had traced it out after a lot of difficulty. Sindhu is extremely touched, and her aggressiveness comes to an end.

Sree constantly tries to talk Sindhu into agreeing to their marriage, but she sternly refuses since she wants to achieve her dream of opening a restaurant in Los Angeles. Meanwhile, Sree's mother is hell-bent on finding a good bride for him, which puts Sree in a complete dilemma. Sindhu's father invites the couple to his dance show, but Sree's mother falls sick, and he comes in late for the show, making Sindhu upset. At the show, he pesters her about their marriage, citing his mother's ill health as his imminent reason to soon marry. When Sindhu refuses to budge, he decides to break up with her for his mother's sake and to marry a girl that his parents fix an alliance with.

A day before his marriage, Sindhu turns up at his home to bid him goodbye before leaving Chennai. The two part ways with heavy hearts. On the day of his wedding, while Sindhu's father is driving her to the airport, he confesses about how he did not acknowledge Sindhu's mother's love for him and how he regretted it after she died, and he asks Sindhu not to make the same mistake. Suddenly, Sindhu realises she has to stop the marriage and rushes back to Sree's wedding avenue, only to realise that the wedding is over and she turns to leave in tears.

Three years later, Sindhu has opened her dream restaurant. She eventually learns that Sree is getting a divorce. Sindhu's father visits Sree's parents and tells about his daughter's love for Sree, while Sree's parents lament over his failed marriage. Sree's wife had gotten an abortion as revenge for an argument which Sree won. Sree's mother accepts the fact that happily live-in relationships are better than unhappy marriages. Suddenly, Sree's parents and Sindhu's father realise that both of them have been missing for three days and wonder where they are. The film ends as Sree and Sindhu are seen having sex secretly, as their parents call them. Their mindsets are shown to have reversed, as Sree now wants a live-in relationship but Sindhu prefers marriage.

== Cast ==
- Harish Kalyan as Sree Kumar
- Raiza Wilson as Sindhuja
- Anand Babu as Sindhuja's father
- Rekha as Sree's mother
- Pandian as Sree's father
- Munishkanth as Tailor Thangaraj
- Subbu Panchu as Manager
- Deepz as Sathish
- Ivaney Prem as Ivaney
- Umadevi as Shanthi
- S. Manimegalai
- Kaviarasan
- Prahini
- Aravind Murali
- Lakshmi
- S. Mitthun
- Farhas
- Master Kevin

== Production ==
In late October 2017, musician Yuvan Shankar Raja revealed that he would produce his first feature film, which would be a co-production with Rajarajan of K Productions. The film was announced as a romantic comedy to be directed by Elan, with Harish Kalyan and Raiza Wilson in the lead roles. The actors had risen to fame following their appearances on Star Vijay's reality television show Bigg Boss. Though Elan was to have made his directorial debut with Graghanam, that film's failure to release made this his official debut. He recalled that, after he completed the script, he began working on his next without reaching out to producers. By chance, a friend of Yuvan asked if he had any romance scripts, leading to this project being picked up. While Harish was selected to portray an "innocent middle-class boy", Raiza was auditioned alongside over thirty other actresses, before the team chose her to portray an "outgoing girl". Although Raiza had debuted as an extra with Velaiilla Pattadhari 2 (2017), this is her first proper acting role.

Titled Pyaar Prema Kaadhal after the lyrics of Silambarasan's "Love Anthem For World Peace", production began during mid-November 2017 in Chennai, with cinematographer Raja Battacharjee, editor S. Manikumaran and art director forming the technical crew. Yuvan's wife Zafroon Nizar worked as the costumes designer for Raiza, thus making her debut in the film industry. The first schedule of the film was finished in early December 2017, with Bhanupriya also joining the cast to portray Harish Kalyan's mother; she, however, was replaced later by Rekha. By mid-January 2018, Elan revealed that 70% of the film was completed and that the editing process was going on simultaneously. After completing the talkie portions by March 2018, the team flew to Azerbaijan to film a song sequence. With that, overall filming wrapped in May 2018.

== Music ==
The soundtrack album of Pyaar Prema Kaadhal was composed by Yuvan Shankar Raja, which features 12 tracks, the most ever in his album. The lyrics were written by Niranjan Bharathi, Vivek, Madhan Karky and Mohan Rajan, Malaysian singer-songwriter Oviya Oomapathy, and Elan himself. Sid Sriram, Sanjith Hegde, Al Rufian and Teejay Arunasalam recorded for the film's songs, collaborating with the composer for the first time, as well as lyricists Vivek and Mohan Rajan. The album was preceded with two singles: "High On Love" and "Dope Track" released on 13 February and 9 June 2018. The album was released on 29 July 2018 in Chennai.

== Release ==
Trident Arts acquired the Tamil Nadu theatrical rights of Pyaar Prema Kaadhal for ₹3 crore, and the film was released on 10 August 2018. It was initially brought forward to 9 August 2018, to avoid a box office clash with Vishwaroopam II, but out of respect for the former Tamil Nadu chief minister M. Karunanidhi who died on 7 August, it was pushed back to the original date. The film was dubbed into Telugu under the same name and was released on 21 September 2018.

== Reception ==
=== Critical response ===
Thinkal Menon of The Times of India gave 3 out of 5 and stated, "A little more emotional connect would have worked wonders for the film, which however managed to stay away from a clichéd climax". Sify gave 3 out of 5 and stated "Pyaar Prema Kaadhal also has all these elements but what works in favor of the film is a fresh new pair and sensible characterization". Srinivasa Ramanujam of The Hindu commented, "A refreshing take on the complications of modern romance". Anupama Subramanian of Deccan Chronicle gave the film a 3 out of 5 stars and stated "A major success of the movie is Elan's well-etched characters and apt casting of the lead refreshing pair". Gopinath Rajendran of The New Indian Express gave 3 out of 5 and stated, "A gratifying musical modelled on the modern relationship". Ashameera Aiyappan of The Indian Express gave 3 out of 5 and stated "The film felt too 'wannabe' at a few places. But these are very minor grouses for a film that gets most of the things right". Baradwaj Rangan, writing for Film Companion, gave 3.5 out of 5 and stated, "The film is a well-acted, well-made love story that goes far beyond rom-com clichés".

=== Box office ===
At the end of three days, the film grossed ₹9.29 crore (US$960,000).

== Accolades ==
Event	Category	Recipient(s) and nominee(s)	Result	Ref.
Behindwoods Gold Medal	Voice of the Year	Sid Sriram	Won	
Ananda Vikatan Cinema Awards	Best Debut Actress	Raiza Wilson	Won	
JFW Awards	Best Actress in a Debut Role	Raiza Wilson	Won	
Edison Awards	Best Debut Actress	Raiza Wilson	Won	
Edison Awards	Romantic Hero of the year	Harish Kalyan	Won	
8th South Indian International Movie Awards	SIIMA Award for Best Male Playback Singer	Sid Sriram	Nominated	
8th South Indian International Movie Awards	SIIMA Award for Best Music Director	Yuvan Shankar Raja	Nominated	
8th South Indian International Movie Awards	SIIMA Award for Best Debut Actress	Raiza Wilson	Won	
66th Filmfare Awards South	Filmfare Award for Best Male Playback Singer – Tamil	Sid Sriram	Won	
66th Filmfare Awards South	Filmfare Award for Best Music Director – Tamil	Yuvan Shankar Raja	Nominated	
66th Filmfare Awards South	Filmfare Award for Best Female Debut – South	Raiza Wilson	Won	

== Remakes ==
Following its success, Elan announced that Pyaar Prema Kaadhal would be remade in Hindi, with Sandeep Singh financing the project, but it did not materialise. The film was remade in Telugu as Urvasivo Rakshasivo (2022).
