= LGBTQ rights in Tamil Nadu =

- Tamil Nadu
- Legal status: Legal since 2018
- Gender identity: Third gender recognised; transgender people may change legal gender
- Discrimination protections: Discrimination protections in line with Navtej Singh Johar v. Union of India and National Legal Services Authority v. Union of India

Family rights
- Recognition of relationships: Transgender women can marry under the Hindu Marriage Act, 1955
- Adoption: No

Lesbian, gay, bisexual and transgender (LGBT) rights in Tamil Nadu are the most progressive among all states of India. Tamil Nadu was the first state in India to introduce a transgender welfare policy, wherein transgender individuals can access free gender affirmation surgery in government hospitals and various other benefits and rights. The state was also the first to ban forced sex-selective surgeries on intersex infants, and also the first state to include an amendment in its state police guidelines that expects officers to abstain from harassing the LGBTQIA+ community and its members. The state also became the first to ban conversion therapy as well as the first to introduce LGBTQIA+ issues in school curricula.

Same-sex sexual activity has been legal since 2018, following the Supreme Court ruling in Navtej Singh Johar v. Union of India. Tamil Nadu is noted as one of the most open states with regard to the LGBT community, particularly transgender people. Nevertheless, reports of discrimination, arranged opposite-sex marriages, bullying, suicides, and family rejections are common. According to an estimate from 2015, about 16,380 people in Tamil Nadu identified themselves as LGBT.

== Legality of same-sex sexual activity ==
On 6 September 2018, the Supreme Court of India unanimously struck down Section 377 as unconstitutional, ruling that it infringed on the fundamental rights of autonomy, intimacy, and identity, thus legalising homosexuality in India, including in Tamil Nadu.

== Recognition of same-sex relationships ==
Same-sex marriages are not recognised or performed in Tamil Nadu.

On 22 April 2019, the Madras High Court, the high court of Tamil Nadu, ruled that the term "bride" under the Hindu Marriage Act, 1955 includes trans women. Specifically, it directed the authorities to register a marriage between a man and a transgender woman.

== Discrimination protections ==
In line with Navtej Singh Johar v. Union of India and National Legal Services Authority v. Union of India, discrimination on the basis of sexual orientation and gender identity is prohibited via Article 15 of the Constitution of India. However, this article only extends to discrimination by state or government bodies.

Adopted in 2019, the Transgender Persons (Protection of Rights) Act, 2019 bans unfair discrimination against transgender people in educational establishment and services, employment, healthcare services, access to the "use of any goods, accommodation, service, facility, benefit, privilege or opportunity dedicated to the use of the general public or customarily available to the public", the right to movement, the right to "reside, purchase, rent or otherwise occupy any property", the opportunity to stand for or hold public or private office, and in government or private establishments.

In June 2021, a single judge bench of the Madras High Court on Monday issued far-reaching guidelines aimed at mainstreaming LGBTQIA+ persons - from prohibiting attempts to "medically cure" persons belonging to the community to seeking changes in school and university curricula and recommending awareness programmes for judicial officers, police and prison officials.

Saying LGBTQIA+ persons are entitled to their privacy and "have a right to lead a dignified existence, which includes their choice of sexual orientation, gender identity, gender presentation, gender expression and choice of partner thereof", the court said, "This right and the manner of its exercise are constitutionally protected under Article 21 of the Constitution."

== Transgender recognition ==
=== Identity ===
Within the Tamil Nadu transgender community, women and men often self-identify as one of three terms: Thirunambi for transgender men, and Thirunagai for transgender women. While these terms appear as simple interchanges for the word 'Hijra', which is commonly used throughout Northern parts of India, it, in reality, reflects deeper social, cultural, and historical context within the state.

Historically, transgender people in Tamil Nadu have fought to separate themselves from the pan-Indian term 'Hijra'. Borrowing from mythology, the Tamil transgender community has attempted to carve out its own space within the LGBTQ spectrum. The Koovagam festival, rooted in this epic, revolves around the story of Lord Krishna and Aravan (also known as Iravan) and is reenacted annually where transgender individuals, symbolically marry Aravan. This mythological story is significant because it provides a religious and cultural context that acknowledges and even venerates gender fluidity, a crucial aspect of the transgender community's identity.

The Hijra differs from transgender communities in Tamil Nadu by facing enduring stigmatization and marginalization despite their historical and cultural significance in India. This marginalization is not limited to social ostracization, but less access to healthcare, education, and overall financial well-being. Many Hijras are even forced into sex work or begging because of these conditions. Traditional Hijra social structures are also gathered around communal living spaces (Hamams), with gurus, who while providing a support system, also end up isolating them from most of society. This social structure has further perpetuated the criminalization of traditional methods of income and slowed down the formal recognition of their identity under the states.

Contrastingly, transgender people in Tamil Nadu do not typically live in communal Hamams or the mentor-disciple system prevalent among Hijras. Instead, many actively strive to integrate into conventional societal norms, living within traditional family setups and seeking regular employment, thereby consciously distancing themselves from the stigmatized traditional Hijra system. This separation in identity is further highlighted by interactions with trans women interviewees in Tamil Nadu: Trans women position themselves as belonging to the respectable middle class, in contrast to hijras, who face entrenched stigmatization in society. They do this by adopting middle-class markers like education and claims of being 'modern.' ... 'She's a modern girl; she's educated, she's literate. She's called transgender'.

This independence from the Hijra identity does not mean there are no ties to the broader Hijra community. Many transgender women still maintain relationships with Hijra groups but with a separate sense of identity. Their effort to forge a distinct identity does not mean they are exempt from societal challenges in Tamil Nadu. Many still face socio-economic marginalization, with the fight for equal citizenship and rights being an ongoing battle that reflects a broader struggle within the transgender community in India.

However, despite this, the social and legal recognition of transgender people has seen progress within Tamil Nadu. The state has even implemented policies for transgender welfare, which include legal protection and benefits such as the “2008 Tamil Nadu [Transgender] Welfare Board which was formed as the nodal body to address the social protection needs of transgender people." While there is formal state recognition, the translation of these rights in everyday life is an ongoing battle many transgender people face.

=== Transgender rights ===
In 1994, T.N. Seshan, the Chief Election Commissioner, granted voting rights to transgender people in India. In March 2004, advocate G.R Swaminathan appeared before the Madras High Court demanding voter identity cards for transgender people in Tamil Nadu. Responding to the case, the All India Anna Dravida Munnetra Kazhagam (AIADMK) Government informed the court that only 11 transgender people in the state had come forward to register their names in the electoral roll. After recording the submission, the court directed the State Government to publicise, through the media, the right of transgender people to get enrolled as voters.

In December 2006, a government order was passed with the recommendations to improve living conditions for transgender people. The order favoured counseling as a means to deter families from disowning transgender people and making sure that such children get admitted in schools and colleges. Thereafter, in September 2008, the state constituted a welfare board for transgender people.

In a pioneering effort to solve the problems faced by transgender people, the Government of Tamil Nadu established a transgender welfare board in 2008. The Social Welfare Minister serves as the president of the board. This effort is touted to be the first in India. The State Government has also started issuing separate food ration cards for transgender people, as well as special identity cards.

The state of Tamil Nadu was the first state to introduce a transgender welfare policy. According to the policy, transgender people can access free sex reassignment surgery in government hospitals, free housing, various citizenship documents, admission in government colleges with a full scholarship for higher studies and initiating income-generation programmes (IGP). In an additional effort to improve the education of transgender people, Tamil Nadu authorities issued an order in May 2008 to create a "third gender" option for admissions to government colleges. In 2017, the Manonmaniam Sundaranar University began offering free tuition to transgender students.

In 2013, transgender and gender activists S. Swapna and Gopi Shankar Madurai from Srishti Madurai staged a protest in the Madurai collectorate on 7 October 2013 demanding reservation and to permit alternate genders to appear for examinations conducted by the Tamil Nadu Public Service Commission, the Union Public Service Commission, the Secondary School Certificate and Bank exams. Swapna, incidentally, had successfully moved the Madras High Court in 2013 seeking permission to write the TNPSC Group II exam as a female candidate. Swapna is the first transgender person to clear TNPSC Group IV exams.

Along with 21 other trans women, K. Prithika Yashini received appointment orders from Chennai City Police Commissioner Smith Saran in April 2017. Pursuant to a judgement of the Madras High Court on 6 November 2015, directions were given to the Tamil Nadu Uniformed Services Recruitment Board (TNUSRB) to appoint Yashini as a sub-inspector of police as she is "entitled to get the job". The judgement further directed the TNUSRB to include transgender people as a "third category", apart from the usual category of "male" and "female".

On 22 April 2019, the Madras High Court Justice G.R. Swaminathan issued a landmark judgment upholding the marriage rights of transgender women under the Hindu Marriage Act, 1955,

In August 2020 the Ministry of Social Justice and Empowerment appointed Gopi Shankar Madurai as the South Regional representative in the National Council for Transgender Persons.

== Intersex rights ==
On 22 April 2019, the Madurai bench of the Madras High Court passed a verdict to ban sex-selective surgeries on intersex infants. Based on the works of Gopi Shankar Madurai, the Court took note of the rampant practice of compulsory medical interventions performed on intersex infants and children. The Court also expressed its gratitude to Shankar, noting that Shankar's work has had been a "humbling and enlightening experience for the Court".

In July 2019, Health Minister C. Vijayabaskar announced that guidelines complying with the court ruling and banning medical interventions on intersex infants would be drafted. On 13 August 2019, the Government of Tamil Nadu issued a government order to ban forced medical interventions on intersex infants.

== Living conditions ==
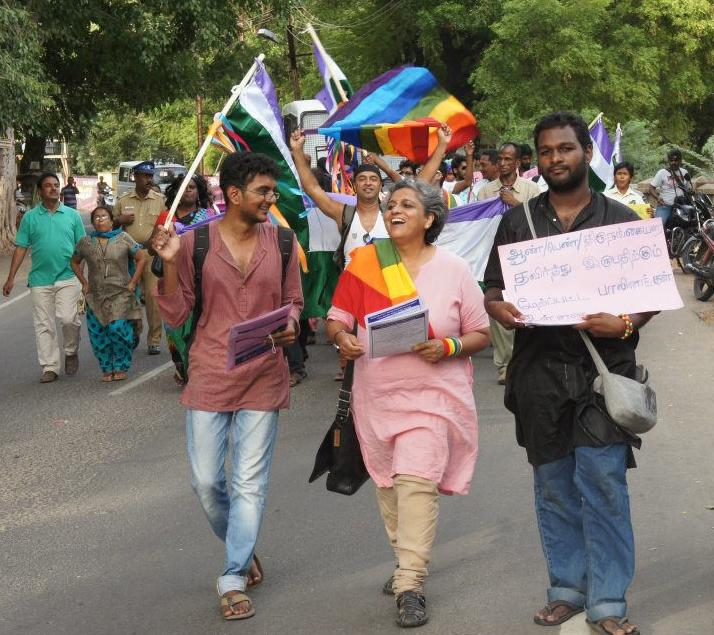
Asia's first Genderqueer Pride parade in Madurai with Anjali Gopalan and Gopi Shankar Madurai (2012)

=== Groups and organisations ===
Various LGBT organisations have been established over the years in Tamil Nadu. These include Nirangal (Tamil: நிறங்கள்), Orinam (Tamil: ஓரினம்), Srishti Madurai (சிருஷ்டி மதுரை), the Sahodari Foundation (சகோதரி அறக்கட்டளை) and Chennai Dost (சென்னை தோஸ்த்). These associations raise awareness of LGBT people, offer helplines to both LGBT people and family and friends, and campaign for sensitisation concerning education and workplace policies, among others.

Chennai Rainbow Pride (சென்னை வானவில் விழா) has been held annually in the city of Chennai since 2009.

=== Helpline and other services ===
In February 2009, the first lesbian phone helpline was launched by the Indian Community Welfare Organization (ICWO) following the high-profile suicide of a lesbian couple in Chennai. Similarly, in March 2009, a telephone helpline called "Manasu" was set up by the Tamil Nadu AIDS Initiative-Voluntary Health Services.

Srishti Madurai launched a helpline for LGBT people on 2 October 2011 in the city of Madurai. In June 2013, the helpline turned to offer service for 24 hours with a tagline "Just having someone understanding to talk to can save a life".

=== Culture, media and television ===
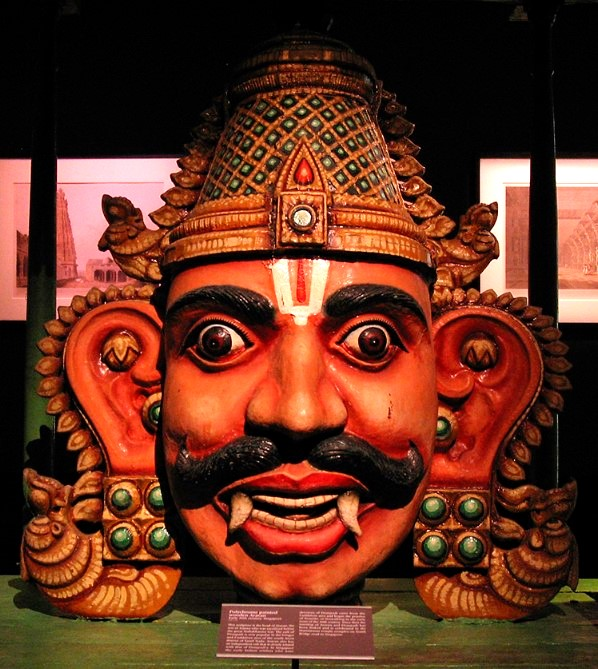
A painted wooden head of Iravan (Aravan), Asian Civilization Museum in Singapore

Ardhanarishvara, an androgynous composite form of male deity Shiva and female deity Parvati, originated in Kushan culture as far back as the first century CE. A statue depicting Ardhanarishvara is included in India's Meenakshi Temple; this statue clearly shows both male and female bodily elements.

Thirunar (Indigenous Gendervariants) meet in Koovagam, a village in Villupuram district, in the Tamil month of Chitrai (April/May) for an annual festival which takes place for fifteen days. During this festival, the participants worship Aravan and are married to him by temple priests, thus reenacting an ancient myth of Lord Vishnu who married him after taking the form of a woman named Mohini. The following days, dressed in white sarees, they mourn his death though ritual dances.

In a monumental push in breaking taboos, the Tamil cable channel STAR Vijay started a talk show in 2008 hosted by a trans woman named Rose. The programme is called Ippadikku Rose, translated into "Yours Truly, Rose".

Karpaga, a transgender person born in Erode, performed a lead role in the Tamil movie Paal; the first transgender person in India to achieve such a milestone. However, Kalki Subramaniam was the first transgender actor in India to have performed in a lead role in a mainstream Tamil movie Narthagi. Transgender activist A. Revathi played a role in the 2008 Tamil film Thenavattu.

=== LGBT literature and studies ===
Vaadamalli by novelist Su. Samuthiram is the first Tamil novel about the local transgender community in Tamil Nadu, published in 1994. Transgender activist A. Revathi became the first hijra to write about transgender issues and gender politics in Tamil. Her works have been translated into more than eight languages and act as a primary resource on gender studies in Asia. Her book is part of a research project for more than 100 universities. She is the author of Unarvum Uruvamum ("Feelings of the Entire Body"), the first of its kind in English from a member of the hijra community. She also acted and directed several stage plays on gender and sexuality issues in Tamil and Kannada. The Truth about Me: A Hijra Life Story by A. Revathi is part of the syllabus for final year students of The American College in Madurai. The American College is the first college in India to introduce third gender literature and studies with research-oriented seminars. Naan Saravanan's Alla (2007) and Vidya's I Am Vidya (2008) were among early trans woman autobiographies. Kalki Subramaniam's Kuri Aruthean ("Phallus, I cut") is the first collection of Tamil poems about transgender lives, it is also the first poetry book from a transgender author in India.

The American College in Madurai also introduced Maraikappatta Pakkangal ("Hidden Pages") as a course book for "Genderqueer and Intersex Human Rights studies" as part of the curriculum for Tamil and English department students in 2018. It is the first book on the LGBT community in the Tamil language, launched by Gopi Shankar Madurai and state BJP leader Vanathi Srinivasan in 2014.

In January 2018, Vidupattavai (விடுபட்டவை) was released at the 41st Chennai Book Fair. The book chronicles the life of a gay man in Chennai in the form of short stories, essays, poems and critiques. The book was co-published by Queer Chennai Chronicles and Karuppu Pradhigal. It was released by Tamil writer and actor Shobasakthi.

=== State government policy ===
Following a series of interim orders issued by Justice N Anand Venkatesh of the Madras High Court in S Sushma v. Commissioner of Police, the Tamil Nadu Planning Commission presented a draft policy for the LGBT community to Chief Minister M. K. Stalin in October 2022, who then forwarded the draft to the Department of Social Welfare and Women Empowerment. The government had initially planned to develop the policy by March 2023, but this was delayed as an eleven member drafting committee of LGBT persons was formed by the Social Welfare and Women Department on 21 June 2023. The committee created a draft LGBTQ+ policy, which was released by the Planning Commission in July 2023 with the following provisions:

- 1% horizontal reservations for transgender and intersex individuals for education and employment as "socially and educationally backward classes",
- inclusion of trans and intersex persons in the Chief Minister's health insurance scheme,
- compensation by the Transgender Welfare Board for loss of livelihood due to gender confirmation surgeries, and
- initial provision of gender confirmation surgeries at select government medical college hospitals.

The horizontal reservation proposal was based on the Supreme Court's 2014 NALSA v. Union ruling which proposed such.

Following the Supreme Court's ruling in Supriyo v. Union, the High Court suggested that a registry for "Deed of Familial Association" for same-sex relationships be added to the draft policy. Further revisions to the draft policy were added by the drafting committee of the Welfare Department, which included the following when published in January 2024:

- creation of a State Commission for Sexual and Gender Minorities
- prohibiting firings of transgender people on grounds of having a gender confirmation surgery
- equal recognition of transmasculine (Tirunambi) and intersex persons
- provision of separate showers and cells for transgender men and women in prison
- prohibitions against familial harassment and corrective rape
- recognition of same-gender relationships by means of Deed of Familial Association
- comprehensive sex/reproductive education for lesbian and bisexual women and transgender men
- non-discrimination in access to housing
- protection from bullying and violence in schools and higher education
- access to gender-neutral restrooms and hostels in educational facilities
- ability to wear gender-confirming dress and uniforms without discrimination in public and private sectors
- renaming of the Tamil-language name of the Transgender Welfare Board from Tirunangai (transfeminine) Nala Variyam to the more inclusive Tirunar Nala Variyam

The department also recommended that horizontal reservations be allowed for both sexual and gender minorities, due to historic victimization against LGBQ+ individuals.

Following the January 2024 release, the Madras High Court commended the draft policy and granted three more months to develop a final draft and solicit consultations from transgender and intersex residents.

In June 2024, the Madras High Court directed the Tamil Nadu government to provide 1% horizontal reservations to the transgender community in education and employment on the basis of gender identity, and struck down a 2015 state government order from the BCC Department classifying transgender persons under Other Backward Class status as a caste identity if lacking a community certificate. The judgement, which granted a petition filed by Rakshika Raj, a transgender woman nurse belonging to a Scheduled Caste community who sought to overturn the GO and force the state government to provide horizontal reservation, ruled that the GO violated Articles 14, 15, 16, 19 and 21 of the Constitution of India, as well as the National Legal Services Authority v. Union of India verdict.

On 7 June 2024, in response to a petition dating from November 2023, the state government informed the high court of its discussions with stakeholders on designing and installing gender-neutral public restroom stalls in all public buildings, with the state government interpreting existing disabled-friendly toilets in all public buildings as gender-neutral.

On 16 June 2024, the Madras High Court ordered the state government to classify transgender residents separately from female and male residents for purposes of education and employment.

== Notable Tamil LGBT people ==
- C. Devi – first transgender woman in Tamil Nadu to contest in the Assembly elections
- K. Gunavathi – first transgender nurse in Tamil Nadu
- Karpaga – transgender actor
- Maya Jafer – transgender activist and doctor
- Narthaki Nataraj – first transgender woman to receive the Sangeet Natak Akademi Award and the first transgender person to be awarded Padma Shri India's fourth-highest civilian award
- Padmini Prakash – first transgender news reader
- A. Revathi – transgender writer and activist
- Malini Jeevarathnam - An award-winning queer filmmaker, producer, actor, show host and activist.
- Gopi Shankar Madurai – youngest candidate in the 2016 Tamil Nadu Legislative Assembly election and also the first openly intersex and genderqueer person to run for public office
- Living Smile Vidya – Tamil writer, artist and actor
- Kalki Subramaniam – Transgender rights activist, first transgender actor to play in a mainstream Indian film, artist, writer, entrepreneur and founder of the Sahodari Foundation
- Grace Banu – first transgender person to be admitted to an engineering college in the state of Tamil Nadu
- Esther Bharathi – first transgender pastor
- Dr. Sudha – first transgender person to receive an honorary degree in 2014
- S. Swapna – first transgender Indian Administrative Service aspirant
- Rose Venkatesan – first transgender woman TV host in Tamil Nadu
- K. Prithika Yashini – first transgender woman sub-inspector of the Tamil Nadu police
- Dr. Meena Kandasamy – Bisexual poet, fiction writer, translator and activist

== See also ==
- LGBT rights in India
- LGBTQ rights in Goa
- LGBTQ rights in Telangana
- Tamil Sexual Minorities
- Hijra (South Asia)
- Third gender
