= Coimbatore Pride =

Annual pride parade held in Tamil Nadu, India

Coimbatore Pride is an annual LGBT Pride parade held in Coimbatore, Tamil Nadu, India. First held in 2010, the march initially only drew a small number of attendees and wasn't held again until 2019. It has since grown to include over 400 attendees, with workshops and events being held throughout the month of June.

== History ==
=== 2010 ===
The first pride event in Coimbatore was held in 2010 under the name Kovai Rainbow Parade. It was organised by Kalki Subramaniam and saw a small turnout with less than 10 attendees.

=== 2019 ===
The next pride parade wasn't held until 2019 and was organised by Kalki Subramaniam, who runs the Sahodari Foundation. The event was intended to take place on 24 August, but was postponed following a terror alert in city. The event went ahead on 13 October 2010 with over 60 people attending. The march began at the CCMC North Zone office and ended at the VOC Park East Gate.

=== 2022 ===
Following a two-year break due to the COVID-19 pandemic, the pride returned with a series of events taking place throughout June 2022. Events included a bicycle rally, film screenings and community workshops. The events were held by Kovai Vanavil Kootamaipu, an umbrella collective of LGBT+ organisations based in Coimbatore. The parade consisted of around 100 people.

=== 2023 ===
Over 100 attendees marched in the June 2023 parade, which was organised by Kovai Vaanavil Kootamaippu.

=== 2024 ===
The 2024 parade drew around 400 attendees with around 200 of the attendees being students from the Coimbatore Model School. Students made their own flags and took part in workshops throughout Pride Month. The 2024 march started at the school and ended at DB Road Square. The event was again organised by Kovai Vaanavil Kootamaippu.

== See also ==
- Chennai Rainbow Pride
- Kalki Subramaniam
