= Grace Banu =

Indian Dalit software engineer and transgender activist

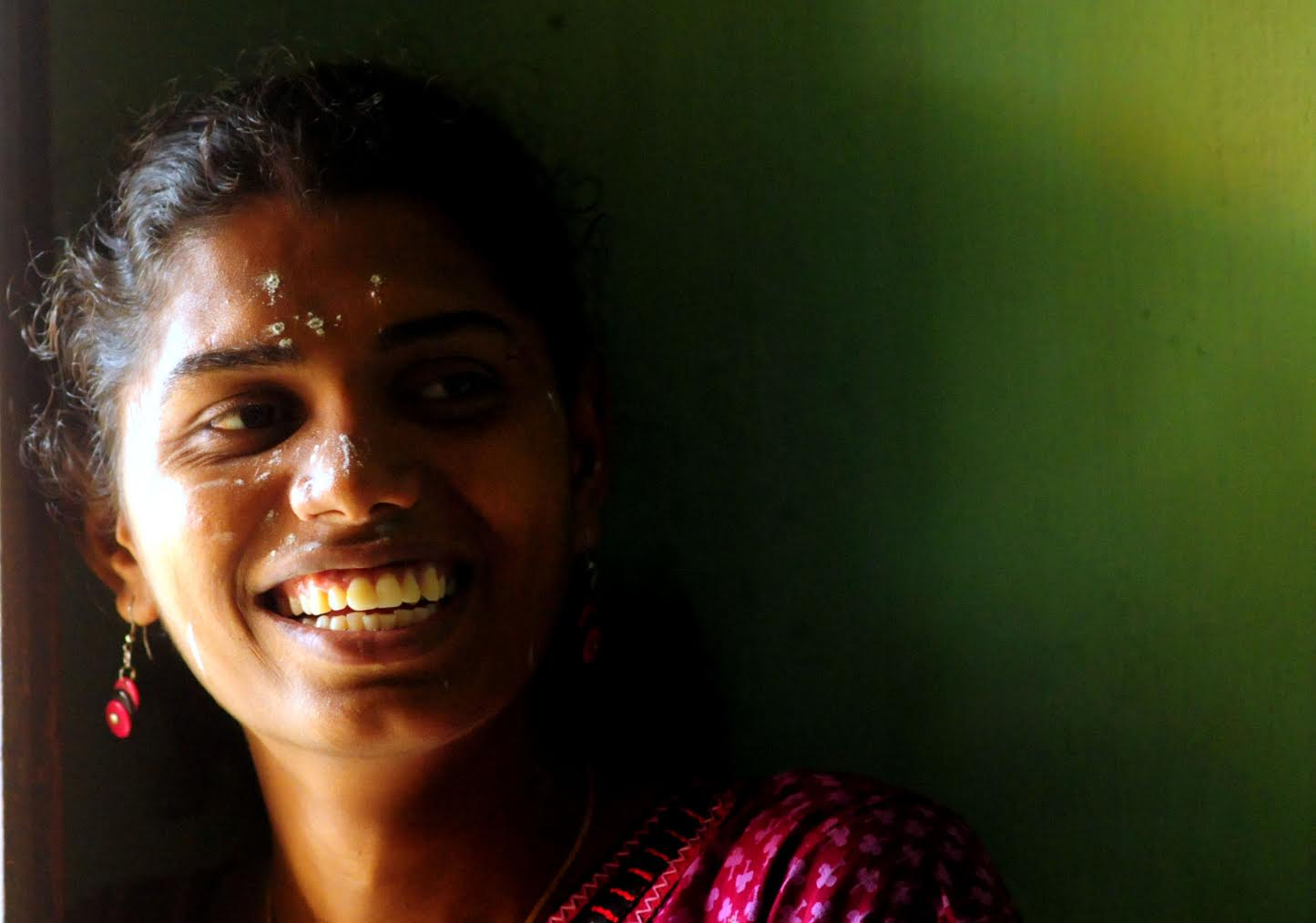
- Born: Tuticorin district, Tamil Nadu
- Education: Sri Krishna College
- Known for: Transgender activism
- Children: Tharika Banu

Grace Banu is an Indian software engineer who is a Dalit and transgender activist. She was the first transgender person to be admitted to an engineering college in the state of Tamil Nadu. She lives in the Thoothukudi district, Tamil Nadu.

== Early life ==
Banu was born and raised in Tuticorin district, Tamil Nadu. A Dalit, she says that from early in her schooldays she was not allowed to attend the regular hours of 9.30 am to 4 pm. Banu said she was in the eighth standard when she began to experience gender dysphoria.

Other students were told that they would be punished if they interacted with her. This kind of untouchability, based on both her caste and gender identity, caused her to attempt suicide and give up on the idea of finishing school. Banu's family rejected her in 2008 when she told them of her gender identity.

Banu was the first transgender person to be admitted to an engineering college in the state of Tamil Nadu, which she obtained through counselling at Anna University. She was accepted to Sri Krishna College in 2013 through lateral entry. It was here she studied Electrical and Electronics Engineering. In addition to being admitted, Banu's fees were waived. Despite this, she struggled to pay for other associated fees and expenses. Responding to a call for help, a local businessman launched an online campaign raising funds for her to complete the course.

== Professional life ==
After completing her Diploma with honours (95%), Banu was selected to work for a software firm as a programmer. She worked as a programmer until she quit due to alleged discrimination.

Banu said that after she revealed her gender identity to management, she was initially told she could not continue her employment but management changed its decision and she was allowed to work under conditions. Banu worked in her IT position for less than two years. She filed a right to Information (RTI) to find out if Anna University accepted transgender students. On finding out that they did not, she applied against their rules anyway and was given admission to a private affiliated college, Sri Krishna College of Engineering.

== Activism and advocacy ==
Banu is the founder and director of Trans Rights Now Collective which centers on the Dalit caste, Bahujan political party, and Adivasi population. She has started several online campaigns, and voiced concerns and questions on the death of a fellow trans woman, who burned to death in Chennai. Banu organized protests and began a legal process to give transgender people the opportunity to participate in Tamil Nadu Public Service Commission (TNPSC) recruitment exams. In 2013, a court order opened the TNPSC exams to transgender people. Banu has been critical of the 2019 Transgender Persons' (Protection of Rights) Bill. Banu was the first recipient of the 'Best Third Gender' award. This was awarded by the Tamil Nadu government and organized by the Social Welfare and Women Empowerment Department. The award is intended to recognize transgender people for their contributions to society. Banu requested it to be called the "Best transgender" award.

Banu worked on helping the transgender population during the pandemic. She identified problems with transgender people's ability to receive a ration card. Banu started two online fundraising campaigns during the COVID-19 pandemic to provide food assistance to trans people, including one intended for performers and folk artistes. In 2021 Grace Banu's group, the Trans Rights Now Collective, advocated for horizontal reservation for transgender persons based on their caste rather than putting all the transgender people in the "OBC" or "Other Backward Classes" category. Banu self-published her first book, Talks Of Grace Banu, in 2019. She and her group, the Trans Rights Now Collective, started The Queer Publishing House.

Banu believes that ultimately reservation, dedicated places for members of different groups, is key to the uplift of transgender people. "No amount of temporary governmental and non-governmental schemes can have the transgenerational impact that reservations can have. Reservations are the only way," she says. she has been advocating for Dalit and transgender rights, demanding along with other transgender people for reservation based on gender identity as well as caste.

Banu insists that the intersectionality of these oppressions matter. She believes that Dalits can be transphobic and that the transgender community replicates structures of caste privilege. She says that upper-caste transgender people bring Brahminism into transgender cultural, community and organizing spaces. Despite being pressed, upper-caste transgender women dominate all the positions of leadership, call the shots and define the needs for the whole community." Denying caste in the transgender community is like "hiding a whole pumpkin in a plate of rice," she says.

In 2022, Banu became the first trans person from India to be shortlisted for a global summit in Australia on behalf of the Australia India Youth Dialogue (AIYD).

== Adopted daughter ==
Grace Banu is the adoptive mother of Tharika Banu, the first registered transgender person to complete her secondary education in Tamil Nadu.

Tharika studied until Class 11 in a government school there. Her parents refused to accept her upon learning that she was a transgender woman. In 2013, Tharika, ran away from her home in the Thoothukudi district, where she did not feel accepted or comfortable. She arrived in Chennai, where she was legally adopted by transgender activist Grace Banu. Tharika credited Banu with helping Tharika finish her education, get an official identification, name change and a sex reassignment surgery.

After Tharika was denied a seat in a Siddha college, Banu filed a court case in the Madras High Court. Banu wrote a letter of assurance that took responsibility if anyone at the school had objections to studying with Tharika. The high court ruled that Tharika would be given admission to the Government Siddha College and the Bachelor of Siddha Medicine and Surgery (BSMS) course.

== See also ==
- Living Smile Vidya, Actress and Veteran Dalit Trans activist in India
- LGBT rights in India
- Kalki Subramaniam, transgender activist in India
- Laxmi Narayan Tripathi, transgender activist in India
- List of Dalits
- Rights of Transgender Persons Bill, 2014, India
- Transgender rights in Tamil Nadu
