= Prithika =

Prithika may refer to:

- K. Prithika Yashini Indian police officer
- Prithika Pavade French table tennis player
