= General Hospital Kaltungo =

Hospital in Nigeria

Coordinates: 9.8201°N 11.3119°E

General Hospital Kaltungo is a government established hospital located in Kaltungo local government area of Gombe state, Nigeria. It provides medical and health care services to the community.

Recently, the hospital had undergone renovation and rehabilitation by the state government so as to make it a Special Referral Centre for people seeking quality medical services, particularly those from the southern part of the state and beyond.

== Upgrade to research center ==
The Kaltungo general Hospital is set to undergo a transformation into a research and treatment center for snake bites. The aim is to alleviate the suffering of snakebite victims in Kaltungo and surrounding areas, offering them much-needed relief from their current ordeal.
