= TRNC (disambiguation) =

TRNC usually refers to the Turkish Republic of Northern Cyprus.

TRNC may also refer to:

- Trans Rights Now Collective, an advocacy group in India
- Tribune Publishing, publishes the Chicago Tribune etc. (NASDAQ: TRNC to 2018)
