= Tamil Nadu Forest Department =

State-level government agency in India

- தமிழ்நாடு வனத்துறை

Agency overview
- Formed: 1856 (170 years ago)
- Jurisdiction: Tamil Nadu
- Headquarters: Guindy, Chennai, Tamil Nadu
- Employees: 9,188
- Agency executive: Srinivas Reddy, IFS, Principal Chief Conservator of Forests
- Parent agency: Government of Tamil Nadu
- Website: https://www.forests.tn.gov.in/

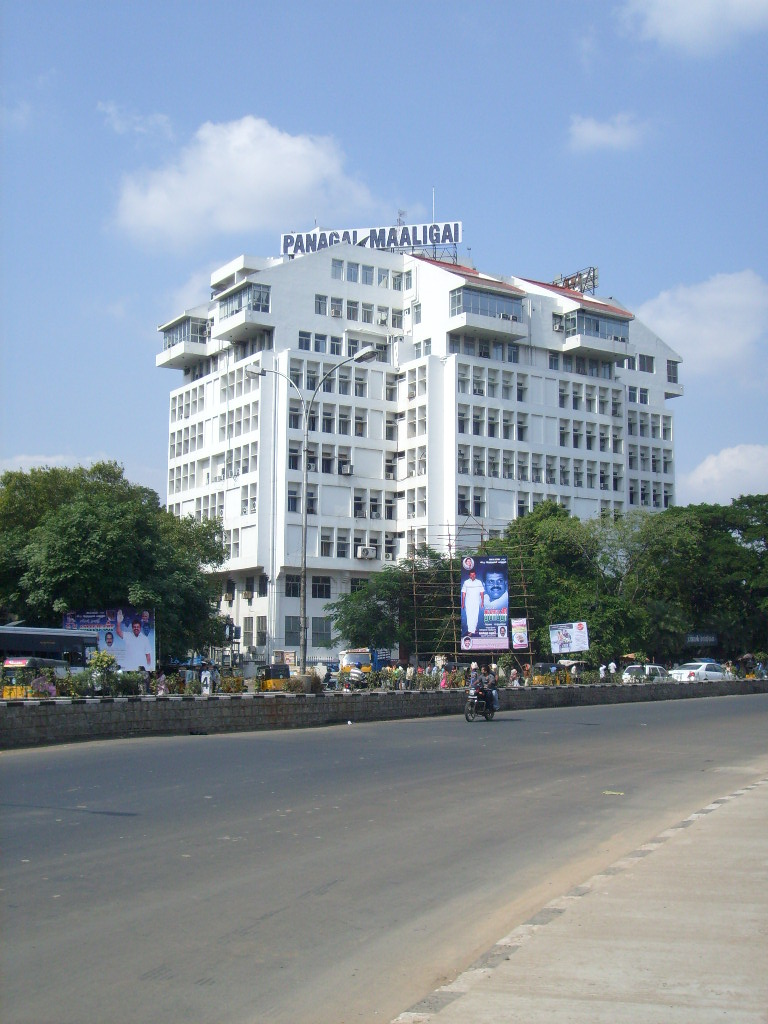
Head office of the Tamil Nadu Forest Department is in the Panagal Maaligai or Panagal Building in Saidapet, Chennai.

Map of Tamil Nadu, India

The Tamil Nadu Forest Department, formerly the Madras Forest Department, is a government department responsible for managing all the protected areas and forests plus environmental and wildlife related issues of Tamil Nadu state in South India. The objective of the Tamil Nadu Forest Department is to conserve biodiversity and eco-systems of forests and wilderness areas to ensure water security and food security of the state.

The Principal Chief Conservator of Forests, Head of Forest Force (HoFF) is the head of the Tamil Nadu Forest Department. The Chief Wildlife Warden, five Additional Principal Chief Conservators of Forests and eight Chief Conservator of Forests function under the PCCF in the head office at Panagal Maaligai (pictured), Saidapet, Chennai. All the Chief Conservators of Forests are assisted by the Conservators of Forests and Deputy Conservator of Forests who have regional and specialised responsibilities.

All officials of the Tamil Nadu Forest Department, down to the level of Assistant Conservator of Forests, are graduates of Lal Bahadur Shastri National Academy of Administration and the Indira Gandhi National Forest Academy and are members of the Indian Forest Service, entitled to use the formal suffix IFS after their name. There are total of 9,188 employees of the department.

== History ==
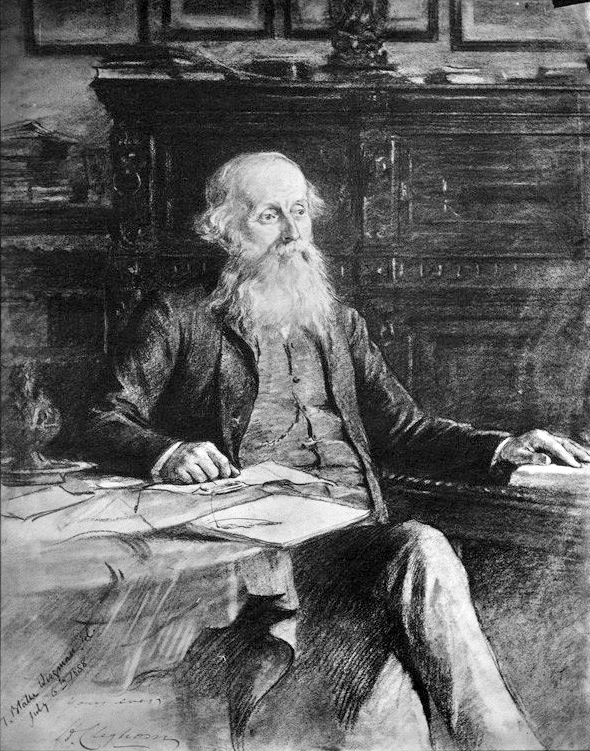
Dr Hugh Cleghorn, founder of Madras Forest Department, 1856

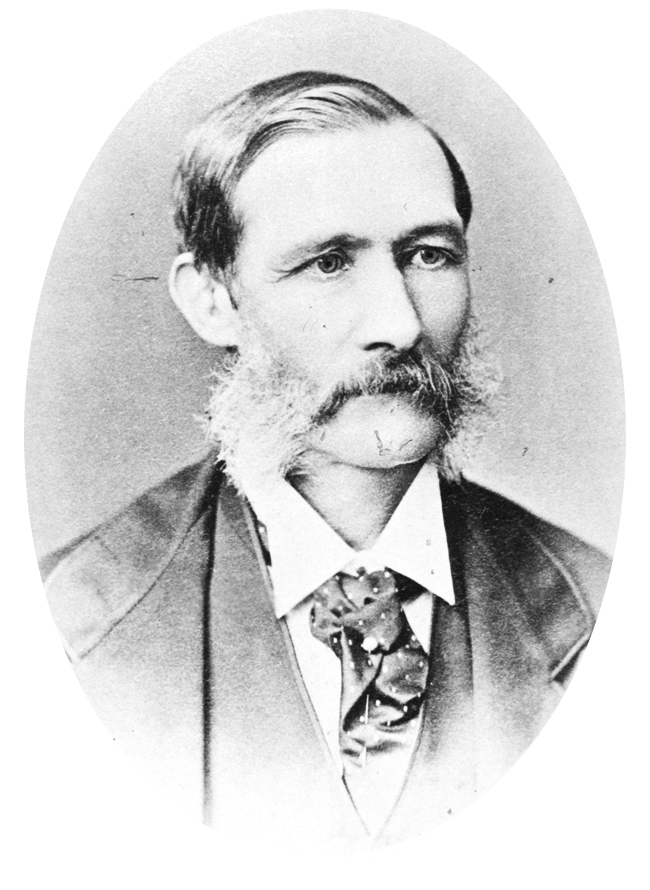
Dietrich Brandis, reorganised Madras Forestry Department in 1882

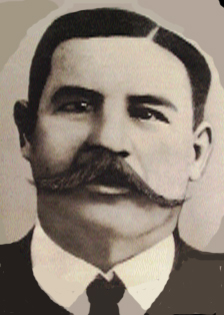
H A Gass, Conservator of Forests about 1906

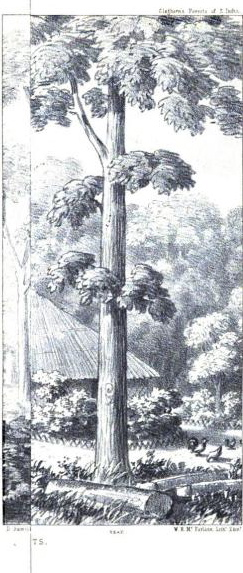
Teak tree, 1870 by Douglas Hamilton

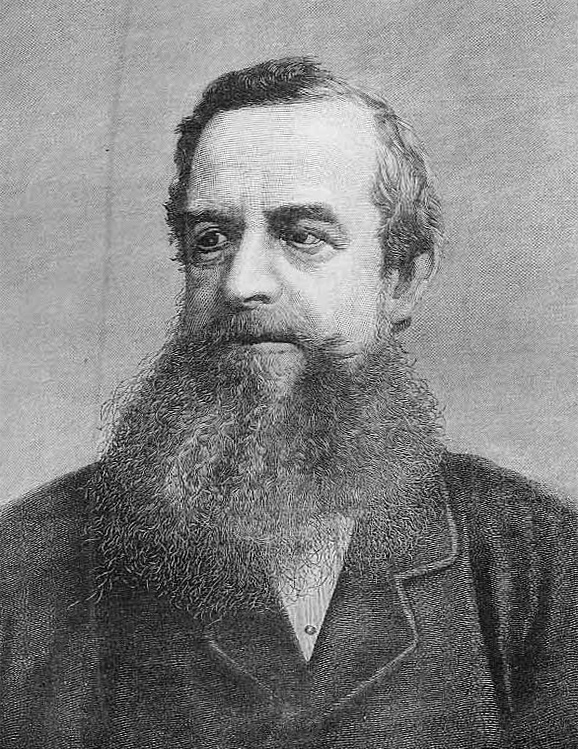
Lord Ripon, Viceroy of India, 1880-1884

In 1855 Dr Hugh Francis Cleghorn (pictured) was asked to organise the Madras Forest Department and started systematic forest conservancy in India. On 19 December 1856 he was appointed Conservator of Forests in Madras Presidency. His persistent campaigning with the Government resulted in the banning of shifting cultivation in the Madras Presidency in 1860. Cleghorn organised the new Madras Forestry Department with such energy and success that he was asked to extend his operations into the Punjab. He also afforded Dietrich Brandis, CIE, FRS, CIE, (pictured), efficient assistance in introducing and systematically working forest conservancy in the forests of Bengal. Cleghorn has been called "the father of scientific forestry in India"

On 10 January 1865, a public resolution by the Government of India designated Dr Cleghorn as the founder of Forest Conservancy in India, and added: "His long services from the first organisation of forest management in Madras have without question greatly conduced to the public good in this branch of the administration".

Douglas Hamilton was very interested in forest conservation in South India, and often visited his old friend General James Michael who was organising an experimental forest conservancy in the Annaimalai Hills. In 1854, he was appointed to temporarily manage the conservancy and showed great aptitude for these new forestry duties. Douglas succeeded permanently to the appointment and for the next three years was in charge of the Annaimalai forests, supplying teak lumber for shipbuilding at the Bombay Dockyard. During this period, he became Assistant Conservator of Forests under Dr Hugh Francis Cleghorn who recently established the Madras Forest Department and whose work led to the establishment of the Forest Department of India in 1864.

In 1857 Douglas Hamilton had to return to his regiment. The assistant conservator vacancy at Anamalai was filled by Lieutenant Richard Henry Beddome, who was an excellent explorer and who had a good knowledge of botany. He was recommended to Dr Cleghorn because of his powers of observation and description. He succeeded Cleghorn in 1860 and remained Chief Conservator until 1882.

After Beddome's retirement, upon the direction of the Viceroy of India, George Robinson, 1st Marquess of Ripon (pictured) and with the strong support of M E Grant Duff, Governor of Madras, Dietrich Brandis reorganised the Forestry Department as it operated smoothly thereafter. J A Gamble followed R H Beddome as the conservator of forests. Gamble's successor was Horace Archibald Gass (pictured). Gass is now remembered for establishing the Gass Forest Museum. Gass was succeeded by F A Lodge and then by J A Master.

In 1868, The Forest College and Research Institute was first established as part of the Agricultural School at Saidapet, Chennai. In 1916, it moved to Coimbatore. In 1989, Masters programme in forestry was introduced at the Forest College & Research Institute, new campus at Mettupalayam. In 1990, a Doctoral programme was also introduced.

In 1969, Madras State was renamed Tamil Nadu (land of the Tamils) and the name of the department was likewise also changed.

== Objectives ==
The overall objective of the Tamil Nadu Forest Department is to conserve biodiversity and eco-systems of forests and wilderness areas to ensure water security and food security of the state. Wildlife and wildlife habitats should be conserved and sustainably managed to meet the social, economic, ecological, cultural, recreational and spiritual needs of the present and future generations of people in the state.

The forests in Tamil Nadu are managed with the following objectives:

- Ensure environmental stability by restoring ecological balance in forest ecosystems.
- Increase forest and tree cover to 33% of the state, and enhance the quality of forests.
- Conserve the wide array of bio-diversity through scientific management and improve habitat conditions for improved forest health.
- Protect and develop the forest catchment area of rivers, lakes, reservoirs and all aquatic eco-systems.
- Meet the local requirements of fuel, fodder, non-timber forest products and small timber to the extent possible on a sustainable basis through the principles of watershed development and Joint Forest Management.
- Sensitise all sections of the society for forest/tree conservation through planning, interpretation, integration and collaboration.
- Increase forest based entrepreneurship to support improved livelihood and develop efficient marketing strategies.
- Make traditional forest produce available to the tribal people living inside the forests and make them partners in forest management.
- Develop alternative renewable energy sources to meet the energy requirement of remote villages.
- Increase scientific management of forests for multiple objectives and to strengthen growth, yield and productivity systems.
- Stabilise coastal eco-systems to ensure protection from natural calamities such as cyclones and tsunamis.

== Strategies ==
Strategies adopted by the Forest Department to achieve these objectives are:

Management sign at entrance to Mukurthi National Park encouraging wildlife conservation

- Provide absolute protection to forested area from all factors causing degradation, depletion and destruction of wildlife and wildlife habitats, by strict enforcement of the Wildlife Protection Act of 1972 and the Tamil Nadu Forest Act, 1882.
- Undertake Eco-development works to provide benefits to the occupants of habitations and villages in and around protected areas and enlist and maintain their support and willing participation in wildlife conservation.
- Facilitate empowerment of women for sustainable forest management.
- Facilitate education and awareness creation facilities including creation of Education and interpretation centres for the benefit of all sections of population, especially students.
- Create awareness of the need to conserve our natural bio-resources through various mass media and other means (pictured).
- Undertake fire prevention and control measures in and around protected areas through specific programmes.
- Undertake habitat restoration, afforestation and improvement measures wherever necessary.
- Relocate human settlements from Protected Areas.
- Prevent outbreak of contagious diseases among wild animals by taking prophylactic disease prevention measures among domestic animals entering Sanctuaries and National Parks.
- Develop ex-situ conservation centres such as zoological parks, breeding and nursery programs and gene gardens.
- Construction of crop protection structures like fences, trenches and walls, etc.
- Identify and restore wildlife corridors to facilitate free movement of animals between, through and around Protected Areas.
- Award adequate compensatory damages to affected persons for death or damage caused by Human-wildlife conflict.
- Restrict and regulate pollution causing industries and activities in a radius of 25 kilometres (16 mi) around protected areas as per the Environment Protection Act.
- Integrate the wildlife Protected Areas on a watershed or landscape basis with other sectors such as Rural Development, Animal Husbandry and Social Forestry for the sustained conservation and development of the area.
- Ensure that each and every Protected Area has a management plan in place.
- Conserve the medicinal plants in protected areas by creation and management of Medicinal Plants Conservation Area (MPCAs).
- Promote wildlife tourism for the Parks and not Parks for tourism. Tourism demands are subservient to conservation interests of the protected areas.
- Encourage appropriate monitoring and research works to develop working programmes and plans, to tackle identified problems in achieving objectives.

== Geographic divisions ==
The Forest Department is responsible for managing an area over 3,305 km^{2} (1,276 sq mi), constituting 2.54% of the geographic area and 17.41% of the 22,643 km^{2} (8,743 sq mi) recorded forest area of the state. The Forest Department is organised in a geographic hierarchy ranging from Regions, Forestry Circles, Forestry Divisions and Forest Ranges to Beats and Watches. Each geographic category has its own level of management.

== Management ==
The Forest Department is organised in an administrative hierarchy ranging from Principal Chief Conservator of Forests to Forest Watchers, Mahouts and others.

=== Principal Chief Conservator of Forests ===
The Principal Chief Conservator of Forests, Head of Forest Force (PCCF – HoFF) is in overall control of the whole Forest Department. All significant orders, permissions, declarations and authorisations of the department are personally reviewed, approved and signed by him.

The Principal Chief Conservator of Forests & Chief Wildlife Warden (PCCF & CWLW) is the principal assistant to the PCCF and is responsible for all wildlife matters of the department. There is also an Eco-development officer directly advising the PCCF.

Five Additional Principal Chief Conservators of Forests (APCCF) are separately responsible for central administration of Afforestation, Planning & Budgeting, Research & Working Plan, Forest Administration and the Forest Conservation Act.

=== Chief Conservator of Forests ===
There are 13 Chief Conservator of Forests (CCF), each of whom manages a forest region in addition to managing a separate technical aspect of Forest Department responsibility statewide. The separate technical aspects are Tamil Nadu Afforestation Project (TAP), Planning and Development, Personnel and Vigilance, Social Forestry and Extension, Biodiversity, Wildlife, Department Working Plan (WP), Headquarters, Research, Extension, Tamil Nadu Forest Academy (TNFA), Field Director – Kalakkad Mundanthurai Tiger Reserve (KMTR) and Director – Arignar Anna Zoological Park (AAZP).

==== Forest Regions and Circles ====
The state is divided into 6 forest regions, each composed of two forest circles. The wildlife matters of each region, including the 5 National Parks in Tamil Nadu, are the responsibility of a regional wildlife warden. There are 12 territorial Forest circles. These Regions and Forest circles plus the KMTR, AAZP, TNFA and WP are the allotted responsibility of the following CCF:

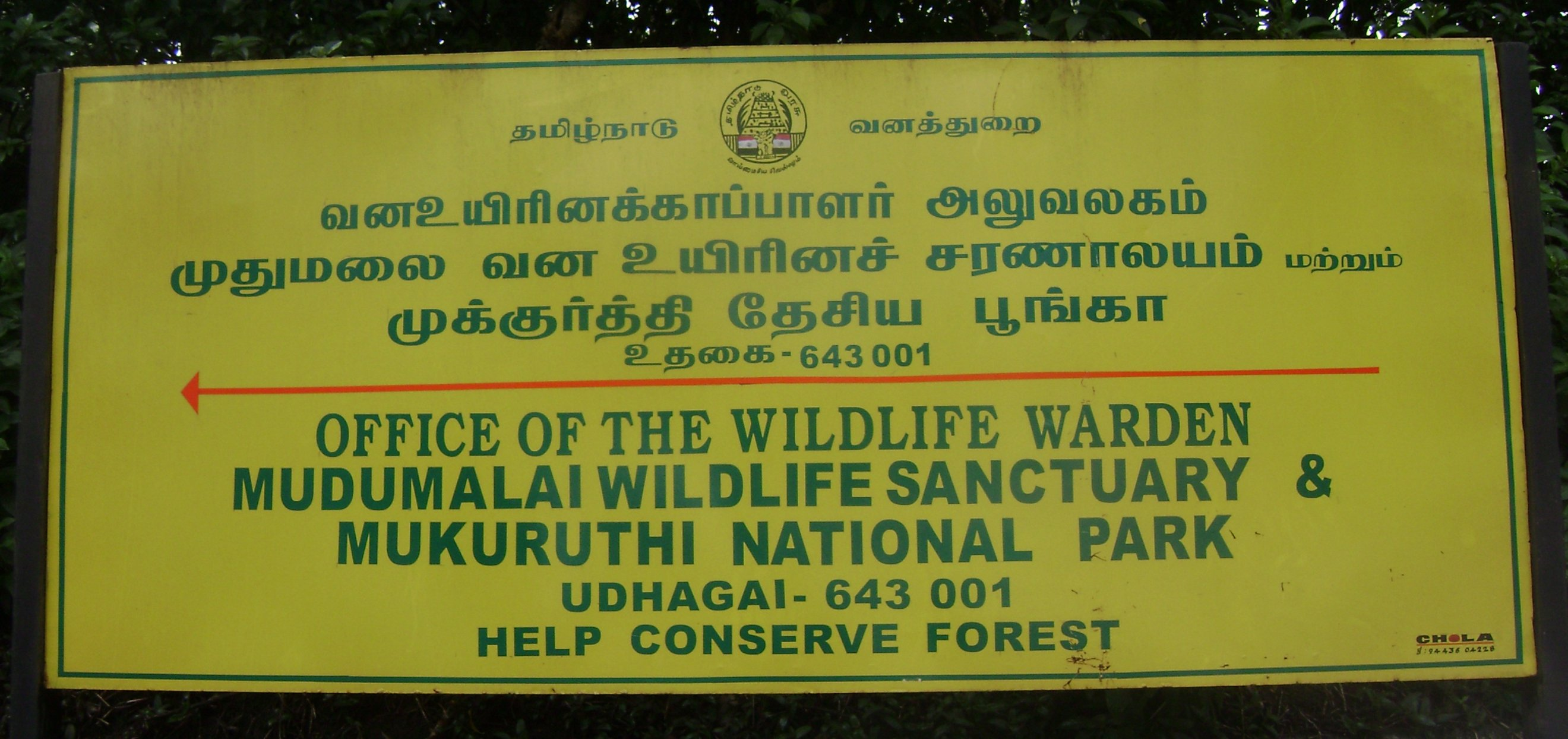
Wildlife Warden office sign at Ooty, Nilgiri North and South Divisions, Coimbatore Circle, Tamil Nadu Forest Department

Chennai region: Chennai Circle & Vellore Circle, CCF (Social Forestry)
Trichy region: Trichy Circle & Villupuram Circle, CCF (Personnel and Vigilance)
Madurai region: Madurai Circle & Dindigul Circle, CCF (Planning & Development)
Salem region: Salem Circle & Dharmapuri Circle, CCF (Headquarters)
Tirunelveli region: Virudhunagar Circle & Tirunelveli Circle, CCF (Wildlife)
Coimbatore region Coimbatore Circle & Erode Circle, CCF (TAP)
AAZP, Director & CCF
KMTR, Project Tiger Field Director & CCF
Special Region, Gulf of Mannar Biosphere Reserve (GOMBRT) CCF and Trust Director
TNFA, Director & CCF. There is also a Principal TNFTC and 2 Additional Directors TNFA
WP, Working Plan CCF (WP)

=== Conservator of Forests ===
There are 26 Conservator of Forests (CF) under the CCFs, with one locally responsible for each of the 12 Forest Circles, 4 for Working Plans, and one each responsible for Planning & Development, Protection, Project Formulation, Forest Consolidation, Publicity, GIS, HRD, TAP-I, TAP-II and Research. There are also 49 Assistant Conservator of Forests, who are usually new IFS officers.

==== Forest divisions ====
Within each Forest Circle there are 2 or more Forest divisions managed by one or more of 17 Divisional Conservator of Forests (DCF) or 18 Deputy Conservator of Forests and 30 District Forest Officers (DFO).

Each Forest division has several Forest ranges that are managed locally by Forest range officers (FRO). Each Forest range is divided into beats, each of which is the responsibility of one of the 585 Forest Rangers in the state.

Each beat is divided into Forest Watches, each of which is the responsibility of one or more of the 1,353 Forest watchers in the state. In addition there are 2,421 Forest guards to assist patrolling the forests.

There are 39 Mahouts and 44 Cavady to manage and train the working elephants (Kumki) owned and used by the Forest Department. There are 1,320 Foresters employed to physically manage the trees in the states forests. In addition, there are 3,256 ministerial staff and other employees in the department.

== Forest Uniformed Services Recruitment Committee ==
Tamil Nadu Forest Uniformed Services Recruitment Committee தமிழ்நாடு வன சீருடைப் பணியாளர் தேர்வு குழுமம்
- Abbreviation: TNFUSRC
- Formation: 2012
- Type: agency of the Govt
- Location: No.1, Jeenis Road, Panagal Maaligai, 8th Floor, Saidapet, Chennai-600 015., Tamil Nadu
- Region served: Tamil Nadu
- Staff: 4+14
- Website: www.forests.tn.nic.in/committee.html

The Tamil Nadu Forest Uniformed Services Recruitment Committee (TNFUSRC) was constituted by the Government of Tamil Nadu in 2012 vide G.O Ms.No. 157, Environment and Forests (FR-2) Department, dated 29 June 2012 for the recruitment of personnel for the Tamil Nadu Forest Department (TNFD) and the 3 Forest Corporation namely

- Tamil Nadu Forest Plantation Corporation Limited (TAFCORN),
- Tamil Nadu Tea Plantation Corporation Limited (TANTEA) and
- Arasu Rubber Corporation Limited (ARC).

The committee is in line with the Tamil Nadu Uniformed Services Recruitment Board that recruits constables, head constables and sub inspectors of police.

The TNFUSRC headed by an officer in the rank of Additional Principal Chief Conservator of Forests and a Member-Secretary in the rank of Conservator of Forests. It will have two members, of whom one will be the managing director of a corporation or an officer recommended by him and the other in the rank of Chief Conservator of Forests.

== See also ==
- Tamil Nadu Public Service Commission
- Tamil Nadu Uniformed Services Recruitment Board
- Medical Services Recruitment Board
