= Chennai Rainbow Pride =

LGBTIQA+ Pride March in India

The Chennai Rainbow Pride March has been held by members of Tamil Nadu LGBTIQA+ communities every June since 2009. The pride march is organised under the banner Tamil Nadu Rainbow Coalition (earlier under the banner Chennai Rainbow Coalition until 2013), which is a collective of LGBT individuals, supporters, and organizations working on human rights and healthcare for the LGBTQIA community. The Pride March occurs on the final Sunday of June every year. The Pride March is usually preceded by a month-long series of events organized by NGOs and organizations to inculcate awareness and support for the LGBTQ community, such as panel discussions, film screenings, and cultural performances. The Chennai Vaanavil Suyamariyadhai Perani a.k.a. Chennai Rainbow Self-Respect March is known for being inter-sectional in nature as it addresses issues with multiple axes such as caste, class, religion coupled with gender discrimination.

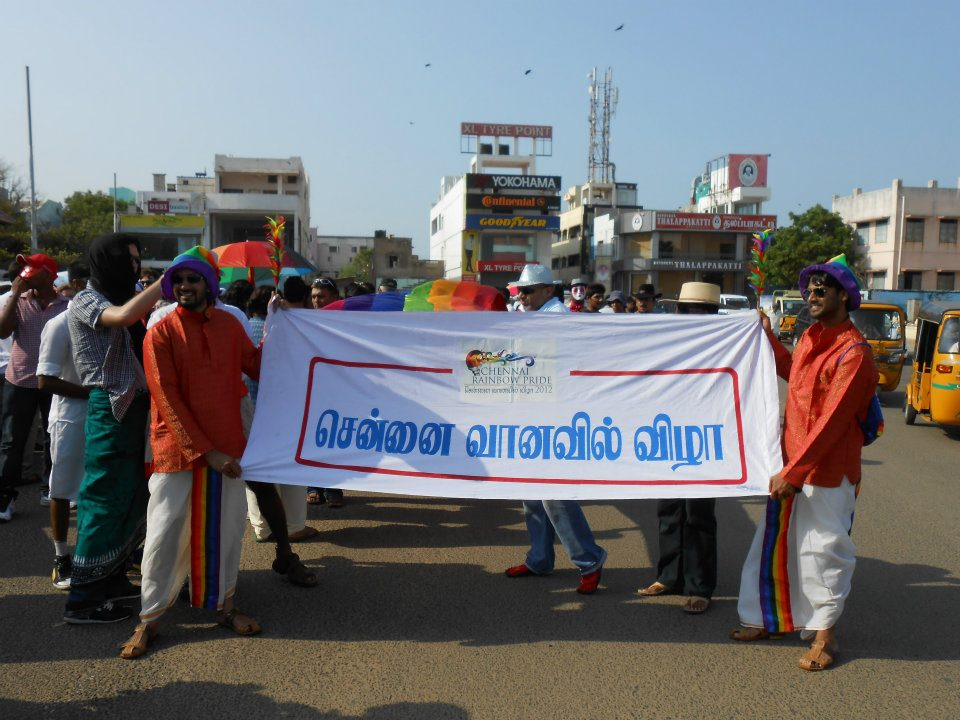
Participants holding the banner of Chennai Rainbow Pride

The march took place at Marina Beach from 2009 to 2011, and Elliot's Beach, Besant Nagar in 2012. Since 2013, the venue has been Egmore, beginning at Rajarathinam Stadium. The Chennai Pride is the only Indian pride march whose pride march coincides with the global Pride Month, which is celebrated annually in June.

== History ==
=== 2009 ===
Chennai held its very first queer pride march on 28 June 2009. The March happened at the Marina Beach; from the Triumph of Labour Statue to the Mahatma Gandhi Statue. The slogan of the march was taken from the words of the Tamil poet Bharatiyar: "Hues may vary, but humanity does not." (Tamil: வண்ணங்கள் வேற்றுமைப்பட்டால், அதில் மானுடர் வேற்றுமையில்லை). The march demanded that parents of LGBT youth and healthcare facilitators stop inhumane practices like "conversion therapy". It also demanded that HIV testing follow national government protocols of pre-test counseling, post-test counseling, and respecting the confidentiality of client.

The police were reluctant to grant permission for the Pride March. Permission was finally granted when the police were told that the parade was being held to thank Ms Kanimozhi, a DMK politician, for helping start the Transgender Welfare Board in the state (a Board that became inactive when the AIADMK party came to power).

Around 200 people from the LGBT community along with their family and friends formed the core group for the march. There were prominent figures from the community such as Kalki Subramaniam, a trans woman who runs the Sahodari Foundation and the TV anchor Rose Venkatesan, also a trans woman. Many others joined in at various points during the evening, with posters and slogans denouncing Section 377 of the IPC.

The preceding week also saw a lot of several events in the run-up to the Pride March. There were cultural performances, panel discussions on the colonial construction of the Section 377 law, a film screening of the Oscar-winning film Milk, and also a support group for parents and siblings of LGBTQ individuals.

=== 2010 ===
The 2010 Pride March was held on 27 June 2010. It was preceded by a month-long series of events, including a debate on homosexuality and family values; an LGBT performance festival; a poetry reading event; a meeting of parents of LGBT people; art, slogan, placard and beauty contests; and film screenings. The 2010 Pride march celebrated the landmark judgment by the Delhi High Court that read down Section 377 (which was unfortunately reversed by the Supreme Court in 2013). It also called for an end to bigotry and violence against the LGBTQ community and lamented the loss of Prof. Shrinivas Ramachandra Siras. It demanded that hijras and other transgender communities in India be recorded in the 2011 national census in the category corresponding to their gender of choice, and not limited by the currently available binary choices of 'male' and 'female'. It also called for affordable and appropriate healthcare, the stop of unscientific as well as sensitive and inclusive media reportage.

The march began at the Triumph of Labour statue at the Marina Beach and ended at the Lighthouse, and saw about 300 participants.

=== 2011 ===
The 2011 Pride March was held on 26 June 2011. It saw over 300 members of the LGBTQ community along with their friends and family march on Marina Beach. The march was the culmination of a month-long series of events including panel discussions, sensitisation programmes, groups meetings and film screenings highlighting the concerns of the LGBT community, which were organised by several NGOS. The participants emphasised the need for the Supreme Court to uphold the 2009 Delhi High Court that struck down Section 377.

=== 2012 ===
The 2012 Pride March was held on 24 June 2012 on Elliots's Beach Road, Besant Nagar. As in past years, it used the words of the Tamil poet Thiruvalluvar as its rallying cry: "Can love be shackled?" (Tamil: அன்பிற்கும் உண்டோ அடைக்குந்தாழ்?) Just like the previous years, the March was preceded by activities over the entire month of June such as panel discussions, a three-day film festival, cultural performances in honour of LGBTQ individuals who had lost their lives, as well as poster and placard making sessions.

The March called upon the Supreme Court to uphold the 2009 Delhi High Court that struck down Section 377. It commended the policy decisions of the government in its inclusion of the LGBTQ population in its drafting of the 12th National Five Year Plan. It also requested that the Tamil Nadu government continue and build on the work of the Aravani Welfare Board that was instituted for the welfare of the trans woman community. Like other years, it called for an end to violence and discrimination against LGBTQ people in healthcare and educational institutions, as well as within the family, and in representation in the media.

2012 was also the first time that the Pride March saw the inclusion and support of corporate bodies and companies. However, the organizers maintained that they did not accept donations from the corporate bodies as they wanted to keep the March free from corporate influence.

=== 2013 ===
The 2013 Pride march was Chennai's fifth Pride March and held on 29 June 2013. This time, the venue was shifted to Egmore, from Rajarathinam Stadium to Langs Garden Road, as police permission for protests was only available at this venue, and not at Marina or Besant Nagar beaches. The march still saw a participation of about 350 people. One of the new demands in 2013 was to extend the services of the transgender welfare board to all sexual minorities. There was also a long-pending demand raised for the clarity in inheritance laws.

The March saw some opposition. At the venue, a group of twelve people, who called themselves ‘Members of Christian Fellowship,’ held banners opposing homosexuality and distributed copies of the New Testament. However, the march went on as planned.

The run-up to the March included cultural performances, film festivals, sensitisation workshops, parents meets and panel discussions on workplace diversity over the month of June.

=== 2014 ===
The 2014 Pride march was held on 29 June 2014. The march celebrated the historic NALSA judgment, in which the Supreme Court recognised the rights of the transgender community, and lamented the Supreme Court's 2013 judgment that overturned the 2009 judgment by the Delhi High Court Court which had struck down Section 377. The "Tamil Nadu Rainbow Coalition" held cultural programmes, seminars, film screening and parents' meet as part of the run-up to the pride.

=== 2015 ===
Starting from Rajarathinam Stadium, Egmore to Mahatma Gandhi Road, Nungambakkam, the Chennai Pride March 2015 was held on 28 June 2015. The month long celebrations also saw plays by a theatre group, panel discussions, a story-telling workshop, film festival and a panel discussion, "Society and LGBT Community-building bridges".

=== 2016 ===
Taking the same route as the previous year, the Chennai Pride March was held on 26 June 2016. The main focus of the year were just two demands – equal rights and dismissal of Section 377. The March saw about 600-odd members who walked about 2.5 km and also observed silence for the Orlando killings.

=== 2017 ===
The ninth Chennai Rainbow Pride March was held on 25 June 2017. The March culminated a month-long series of events for Pride Month, including sensitization programmes on sexuality and gender-identity, cultural performances, health information talks, solidarity events, films and poster making sessions. The Chennai Pride held a special focus on intersectionality, with its posters and press release raising issues against Hindi imposition in South India, Hindutva politics, and cultural erasure. Its press release stated that it stood in "solidarity with the Dalit community, people with disability, farmers, sex workers of all genders, other minorities, women, and all others struggling against oppression."

The March saw some controversy when some corporate organisations attempted to distribute branded merchandise, which is not allowed by the Chennai Pride organisers. The Chennai Pride has strict guidelines about corporate sponsorship – employees are allowed to wear clothing with their company's brand or logo, but are not allowed to have any sort of branding in their placards or distribute marketing merchandise. The Pride March organisers confiscated the branding material.

=== 2018 ===
The 2018 Chennai Rainbow Pride March celebrated ten years of Chennai Rainbow Pride, and was held on 24 June 2018. The Pride followed the same route as the previous year, that commenced at Rajarathinam Stadium in Egmore and ended at Albert theatre via Langes garden road. The decadal celebration of the 'Chennai Vaanavil Suyamariyadhai Perani' a.k.a. 'Chennai Rainbow Self-Respect march' witnessed around 700 members of different genders and sexualities marching, dancing and raising slogans this year.

A wide range of topics including sex work, marital rape, and institutionalized discrimination were discussed. They demanded stringent implementation of the 2014 NALSA National Legal Services Authority v. Union of India judgement which includes legal recognition for person's transition within the male and female spectrum, social welfare schemes, better healthcare facilities, etc.

As with previous years, the Pride March demanded that the Supreme Court reverse the Koushal judgment of 11 December 2013, which had reversed the 2009 Delhi High Court's reading down of Section 377. The March opposed the contentious Transgender Persons (Protection of Rights) Bill 2016, seeking instead a bill that complied with the 2014 NALSA Judgment which ensured the rights of transgender persons in India. The press release also stated its usual demands of access to stigma-free healthcare, discrimination-free workplaces, LGBTIQA+ inclusive counselling services in educational institutions and workplace, formation of support groups and reservation for transgender people in educational institutions.

=== 2019 ===
The 11th Chennai Rainbow Pride March took place on July 1, 2019, marking an especially celebratory event as it was the first march since the partial decriminalization of Section 377. Organized by the Tamil Nadu Rainbow Coalition, the event saw hundreds of participants, including members of the LGBTQIA+ community and allies, marching to raise awareness on a variety of social issues, including consent, equality, and feminism.

This year’s march, which began at Adithanar Road Junction on Langs Garden Road, Pudupet, was marked by vibrant colors, parai beats, and a strong sense of community. The change in venue from Rajarathinam Stadium was a last-minute adjustment, but it did not dampen the spirit of inclusivity and intersectionality. Chants and placards highlighted the intersectional issues of casteism, fascism, and class discrimination, reflecting the march’s ongoing commitment to addressing broader social injustices alongside LGBTQIA+ rights.

In contrast to previous years, the 2019 Pride Parade had a noticeably more upbeat and celebratory tone, with fewer chants against Section 377, reflecting the progress made in LGBTQIA+ rights. The march concluded with performances by prominent queer figures and allies, celebrating the strides made by the community over the past year. Notably, the event saw increased participation from younger individuals and garnered international attention, with attendees expressing pride in the growth and inclusivity of Chennai’s Pride movement.

=== 2020-2021 ===
Initiated in 2009, the Chennai Rainbow Pride March went on a two-year hiatus in 2020 and 2021. This pause was a precautionary measure against the SARS-CoV-2 pandemic, during which many Pride volunteers were dedicated to relief work and resource mobilization in response to the crisis. The focus shifted towards supporting affected communities and addressing urgent needs brought on by the pandemic.

=== 2022 ===
The 2022 Chennai Rainbow Pride was held on 26 June 2022, following a two-year hiatus due to the COVID-19 pandemic. Organized by the Tamil Nadu Rainbow Coalition, the march began at Langs Garden Road in Egmore, the same starting point as previous years. This year's Pride witnessed a vibrant and lively atmosphere as LGBTQIA+ community members and allies gathered to celebrate love, identity, and acceptance. The event included not only the march but also cultural performances, such as music, dance, and a fashion show by the transmasculine community, showcasing the diversity and creativity of the participants.

Approximately 1,000 participants joined the parade, donning colorful outfits, face paint, and carrying banners and flags that represented the spectrum of gender and sexuality. The celebrations also included the inauguration of the Transgender Dance Academy, which highlighted the increasing recognition and support for transgender rights within the broader community. Additional events such as poetry sessions, film screenings, and workshops were planned to continue the Pride Month celebrations throughout June.

In addition to celebrating Pride, the marchers also took the opportunity to demand equality and respect for all, continuing the tradition of the Pride March being both a celebration and a protest. The event was marked by joy and solidarity as participants danced to traditional music, Bollywood songs, and the beats of dhols, emphasizing the community's resilience and spirit of resistance.

=== 2023 ===
The 2023 Chennai Rainbow Pride March, held on 2 July 2023, marked a significant milestone as it became the largest Pride event in the city's history. The march saw over 5,500 participants parading down Langs Garden Road, Egmore, in a vibrant display of rainbow colors, flags, and banners. It featured lively dance performances, chanting, and participants showcasing bold, pride-themed attire. Despite the celebratory atmosphere, challenges such as queerphobia and media insensitivity were highlighted. Participants reported experiencing online abuse and discriminatory remarks, and concerns were raised about the adequacy of police support and the authenticity of corporate backing.

=== 2024 ===
The 2024 Chennai Rainbow March, held on June 30, marked the 16th edition of this annual event and drew a record-breaking crowd of approximately 5,000 participants. Organized by the Tamil Nadu Rainbow Coalition, the march began at Rajarathinam Stadium and concluded at Ramada in Egmore, following the tradition of previous years. The event, which took place under the vibrant lights of the Ripon Building illuminated in rainbow colors, highlighted the intersectionality of identity and activism within the LGBTQIA+ community. Participants carried rainbow flags and placards with politically charged slogans, emphasizing the blend of personal identity and political advocacy.

The march also became a platform for fashion expression, with participants showcasing a variety of DIY outfits, ranging from metallic bomber jackets to sequined turbans. Despite the city's humid weather, attendees embraced bold and creative fashion, transforming the streets into a dynamic runway. The march maintained its roots as a protest, with activists stressing the importance of keeping Pride a grassroots movement, free from corporate influence. The smooth execution of the event, with the support of local authorities, was a testament to the growth and resilience of the parade.

== See also ==
- Tamil Sexual Minorities
