= Tamil Nadu Uniformed Services Recruitment Board =

Indian state agency

- Abbreviation: TNUSRB
- Formation: 1991
- Type: agency of the Govt
- Purpose: Recruitment
- Location: P.T. Lee. Chengalvaraya Naicker Building, No. 807, 2nd Floor, Anna Salai, Chennai-600 002, Tamil Nadu
- Region served: Tamil Nadu
- Chairperson: Sunil Kumar IPS Retired
- Member: Seema Agarwal IPS (holding additional charge)
- Member Secretary: Dr. P.K. Senthil Kumari IPS
- Staff: 4+18
- Website: www.tnusrbonline.org www.tnusrb.tn.gov.in

The Tamil Nadu Uniformed Services Recruitment Board (TNUSRB) was constituted by the Government of Tamil Nadu in November 1991 video G.O. Ms. No. 1806, Home (Ser.F) Department, dated 29.11.1991 for the recruitment of personnel for the Uniformed Services like Police, Prison and Fire and Rescue Services.

== Organisation ==
The TNUSRB consists of one chairman in the rank of Director General of Police, one Member in the rank of Additional Director General of Police, one Member Secretary in the rank of Inspector General of Police one Superintendent of Police, one Legal Adviser, one Senior Administrative Officer, one Deputy Superintendent of Police, one Personal Assistant and 20 other office staffs.

== Functions and duties ==
The Board is entrusted with the responsibility of recruiting personnel to the Police Department, Fire and Rescue Services Department and Prison Department for the following categories:-

Sub Inspectors:

(i) Sub Inspector (AR, TALUK, TSP) (Men & Women)

(ii) Sub Inspector (Technical) (Men & Women)

(iii) Sub Inspector (Finger print) (Men & Women)

(iv) Station Officer (Fire & Rescue Services)

Police Constable:

(i) Grade II Police Constables (Men & Women)

(ii) Grade ll Firemen (Men only)

(iii) Grade II Jail Warders (Men & Women)

== See also ==
- Tamil Nadu Public Service Commission
- Tamil Nadu Forest Uniformed Services Recruitment Committee
- Medical Services Recruitment Board
