= Esther Bharathi =

Indian pastor

Pastor Esther Bharathi is India's first transgender pastor from the Evangelical Church of India (ECI) branch in Chengalpattu, India. She goes by Pastor Bharathi.

== Early life ==
Pastor Esther Bharathi was born in Tuticorin as the third child and first son to a Hindu family. As a child, she was constantly taunted by classmates and neighbours for being feminine. "I became a loner and could not even complete Class 12," she told Times of India. Tired of family ridicule, she ran away to Chennai where she joined a group of transgender people.

A sister from a local church took pity on her and took her in. She converted to Christianity at the age of 12 and was baptised in the year 2000. Pastor Bharathi began her transition in 2007.

== Personal ==
She has said that her proudest moment was when her niece called her "Aunty", despite admonishments from the other elders in the family to call her "Uncle".

== Education ==
Bharathi struggled her way through education before finding her path as a pastor. One of her sisters enrolled her in a lab technician training course in Chennai. But she had to quit because her classmates ridiculed her threading of eyebrows and use of make-up. She then moved to Coimbatore where she worked as an accountant at a weighbridge for a couple of months, but had to quit after facing harassment from truck drivers.

Bharathi finally graduated with a Bachelor of Divinity from Madras Theological Seminary and College in Chennai. She graduated in 2011, in front of a crowd of 7,000 people.

== Career ==
Two months after her graduation, in 2011, she was sent to lead a congregation of about 40 parishioners in Natarajapuram, a village approximately 60km away from Chennai. Bharathi conducts service in Tamil and English every Sunday and also conducts baby showers and christenings. She now also conducts weddings.

In 2023, Bharathi inaugurated the Jubilee Celebrations of the CSI Madhya Kerala Diocesan Women's Fellowship.
