= Gass Forest Museum =

Coordinates: 11°0′49″N 76°56′45″E

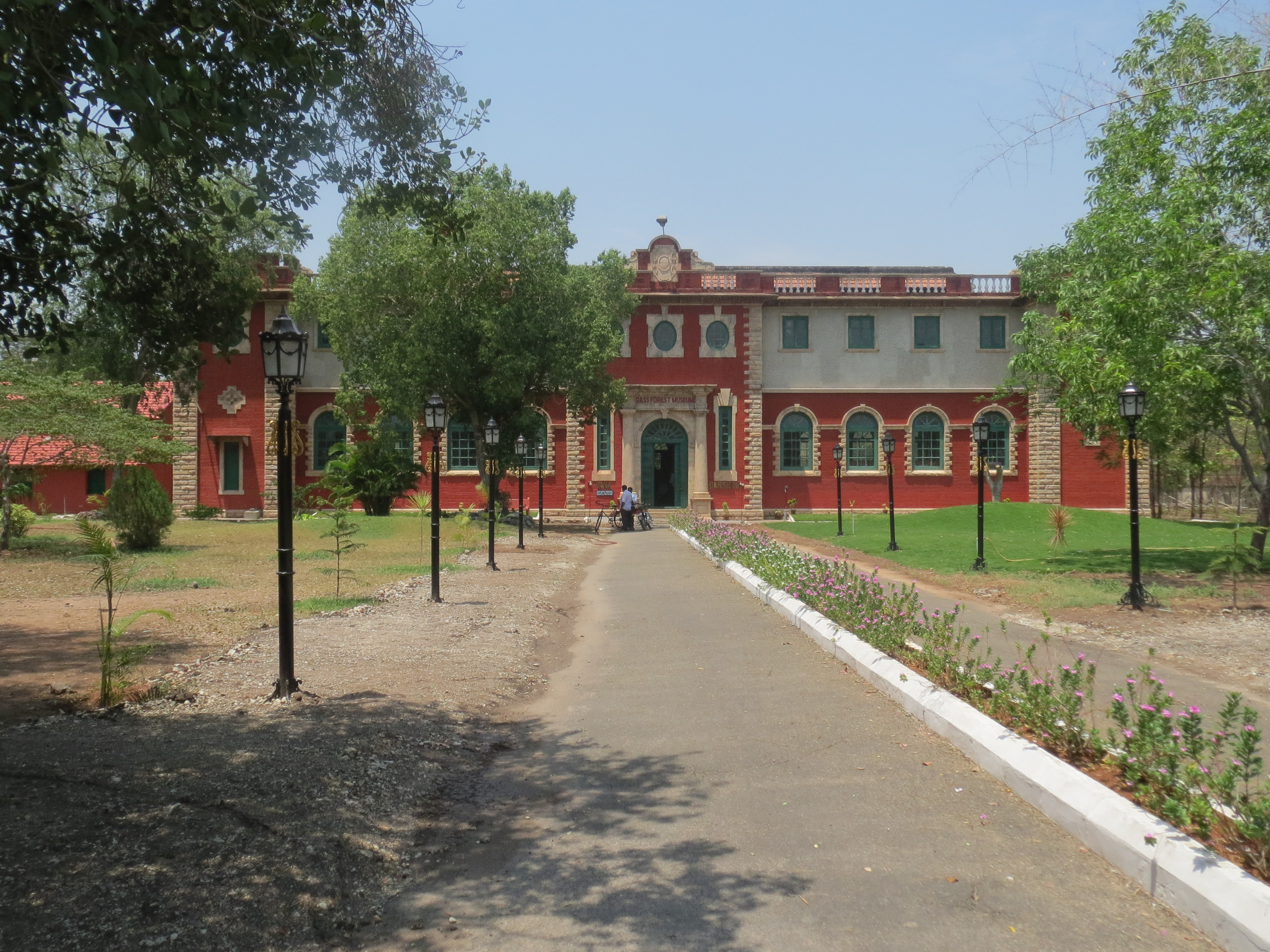
- Former name: The Forest Museum at Coimbatore
- Established: 15 April 1902; 124 years ago
- Location: Coimbatore, Tamil Nadu, India
- Type: Natural history museum
- Founder: Horace Arichibald Gass
- Owner: Government of Tamil Nadu

Gass Forest Museum is a government run natural history museum situated at Coimbatore, Tamil Nadu, India.

== History ==
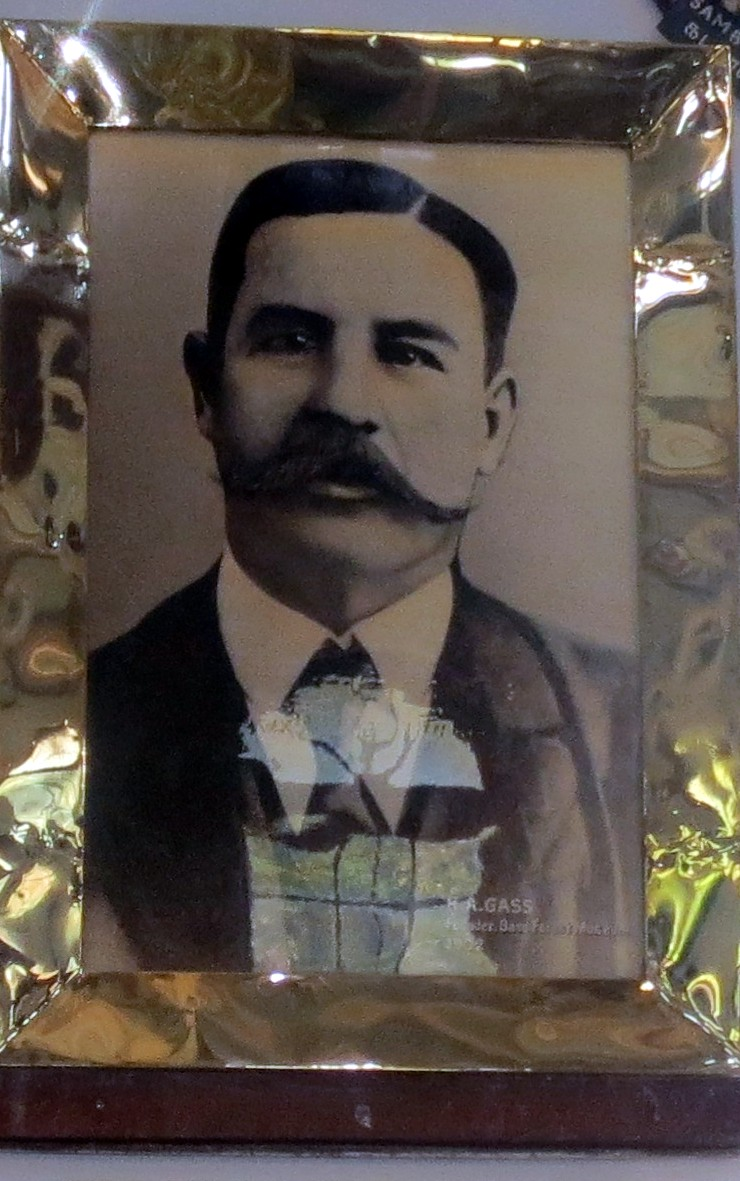
Portrait of the founder, Horace Arichibald Gass, in the museum

Toward the end of the 19th century, an aborted attempt was made by J. A. Gamble, the conservator of forests for Madras Presidency, to establish a forest museum in the province. A few years later in 1902, Gamble's successor as Conservator of Forests Horace Arichibald Gass succeeded in establishing a museum for forestry. It was opened to the public 15 April 1902 by Baron Ampthill, the then Governor of Madras, at that point simply referred to as the Forest Museum at Coimbatore. When Gass, the first curator, retired in 1905, his successor F. A. Lodge renamed the museum in his honor. It was expanded in 1905 and 1915. In 1912, the Madras Forestry College (currently the Tamil Nadu Forest Academy) was established in the museum grounds to train foresters. During 1942–47, the museum was closed and the buildings used as shelters for World War II evacuees from Malta and Greece. After Indian Independence in 1947, the museum came under the administration Government of Tamil Nadu. It is currently run by the Institute of Forest Genetics and Tree Breeding (IFGTB), which is situated in the same campus. The museum was reopened for public on 1 May 2015 after carrying out renovation works. A 3D diorama depicting wildlife in its natural habitat has been added.

== Location ==
The museum is situated in the Forest College Campus, situated on Cowley Brown Road in the heart of Coimbatore city. The campus also houses other institutions like the Tamil Nadu Forest Academy (TNFA), the Institute of Forest Genetics and Tree Breeding, Central Academy for State Forest Service (CASFoS) and other offices of the Tamil Nadu Forest Department.

== Gallery ==
Some of the specimens kept in this museum:

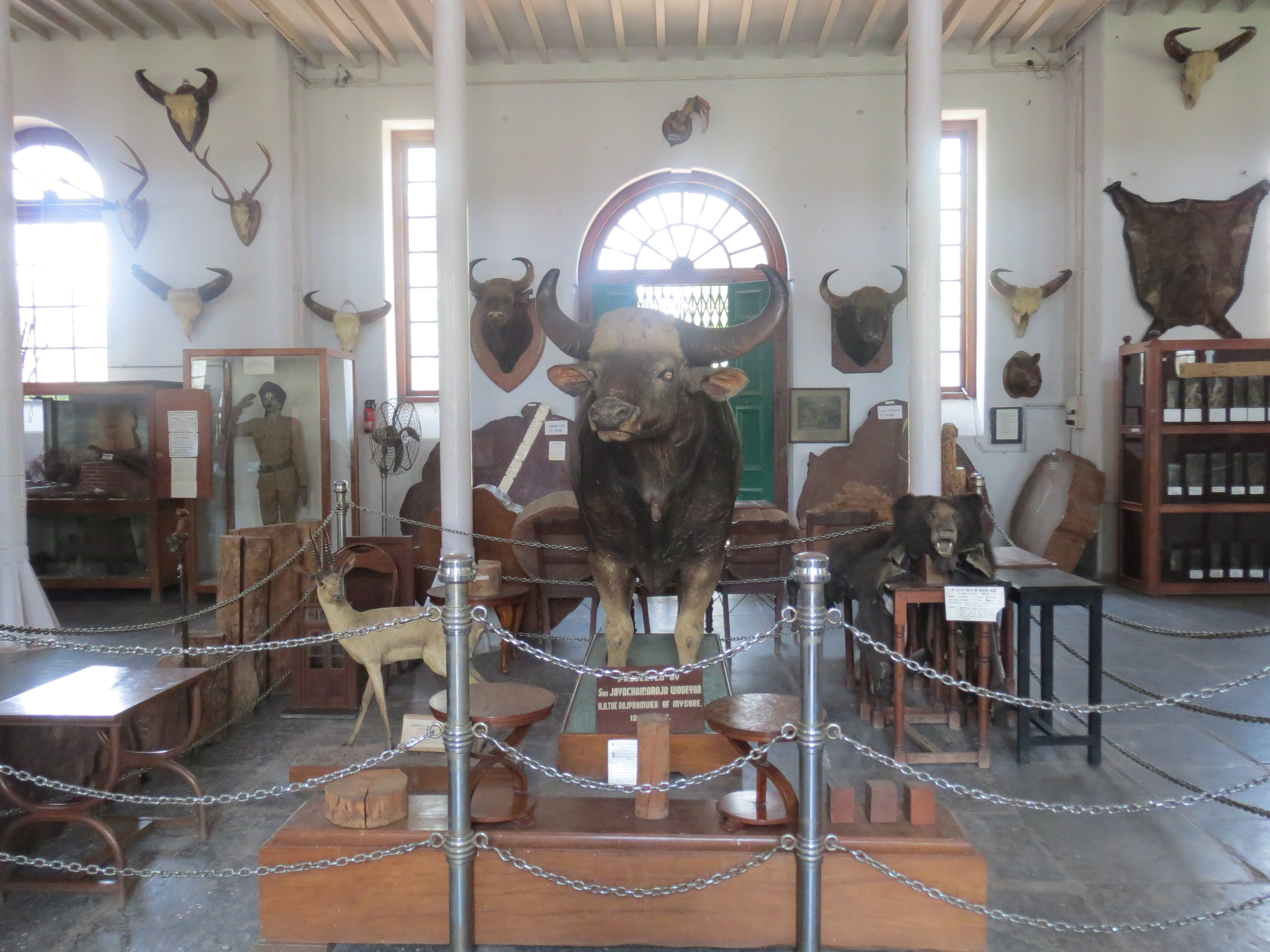
Stuffed Gaur (Indian Bison) presented by jayachamaraja wodeyar, Mysore

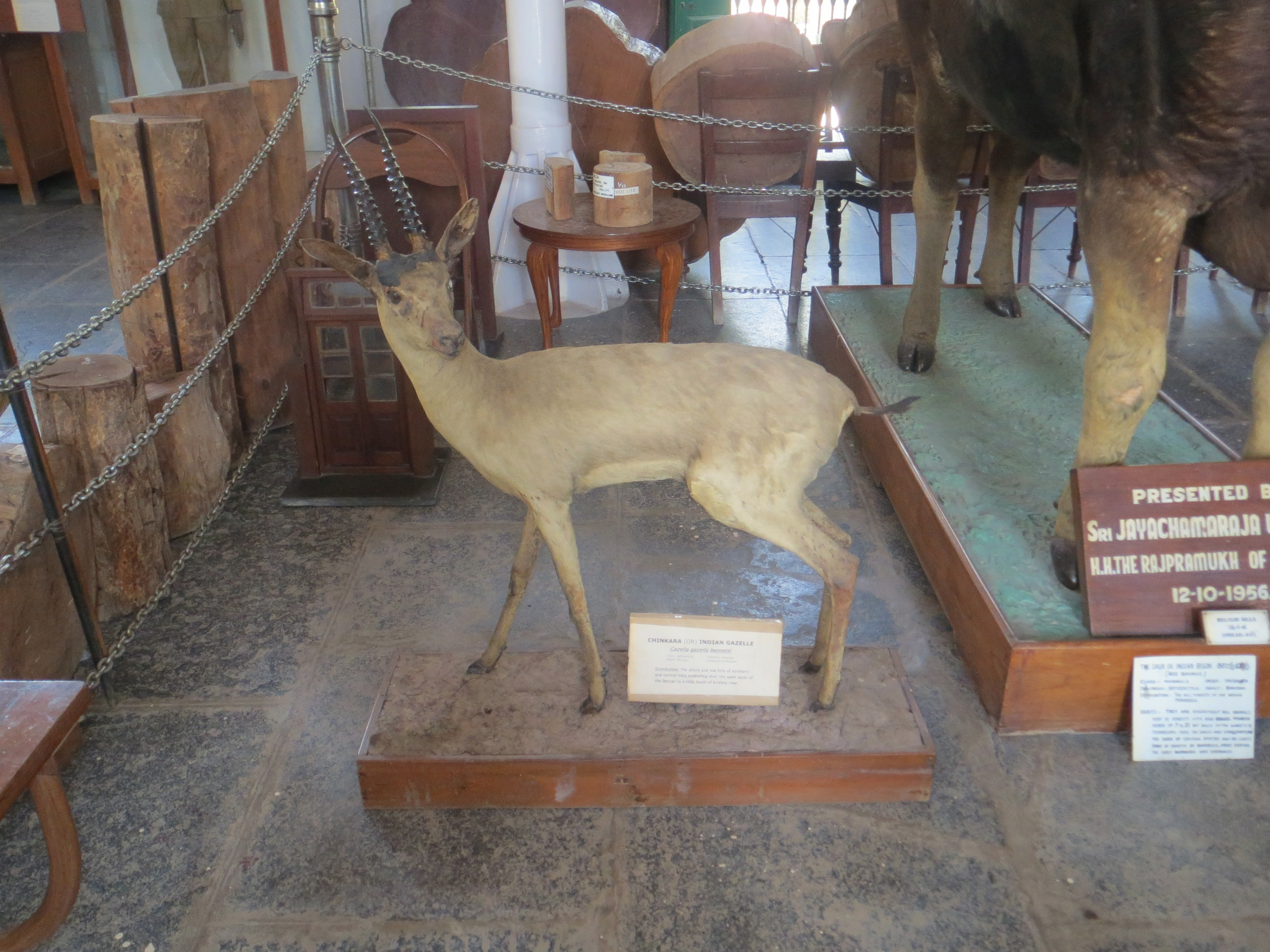
Stuffed Chinkara (Indian gazelle)

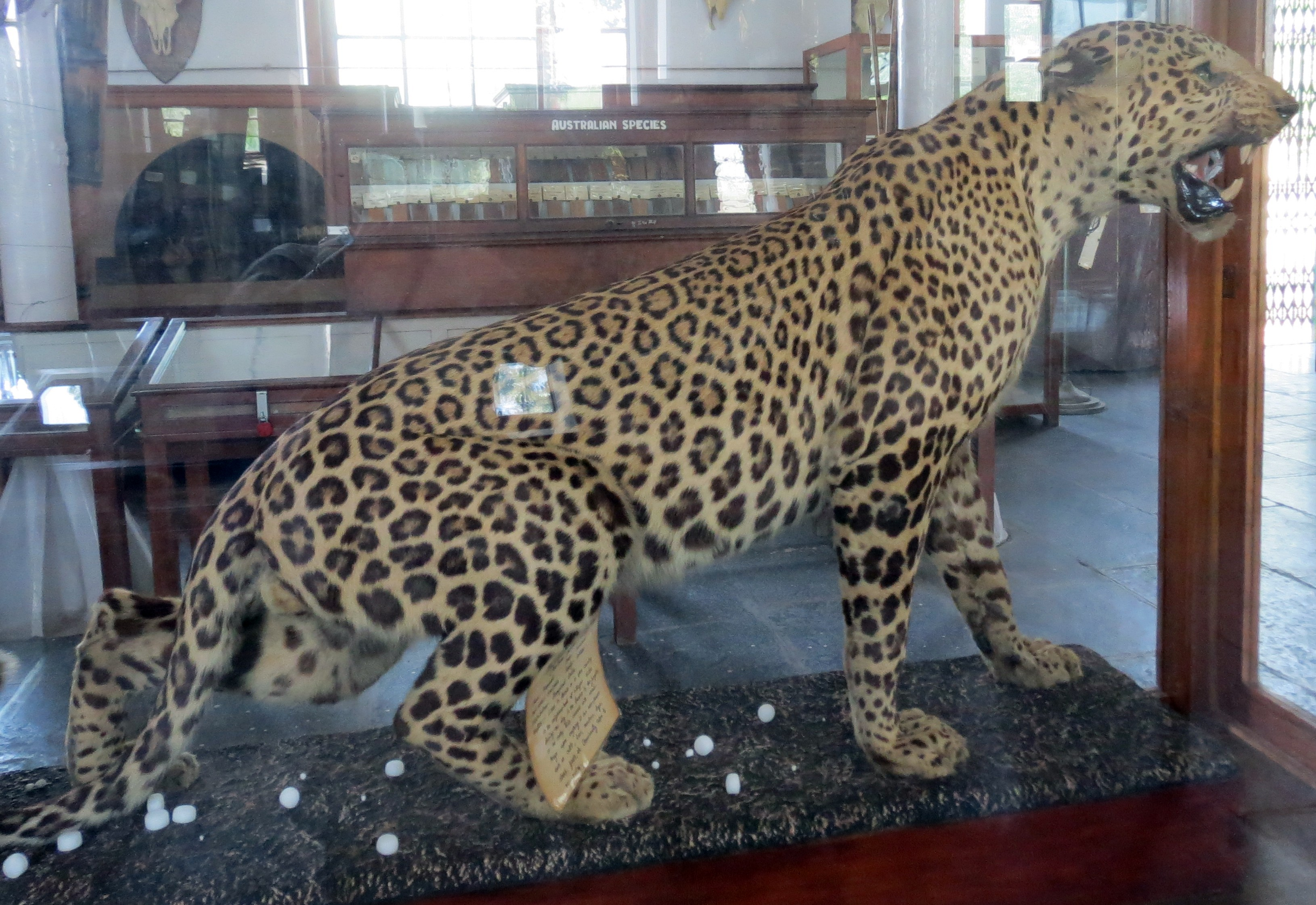
A stuffed leopard

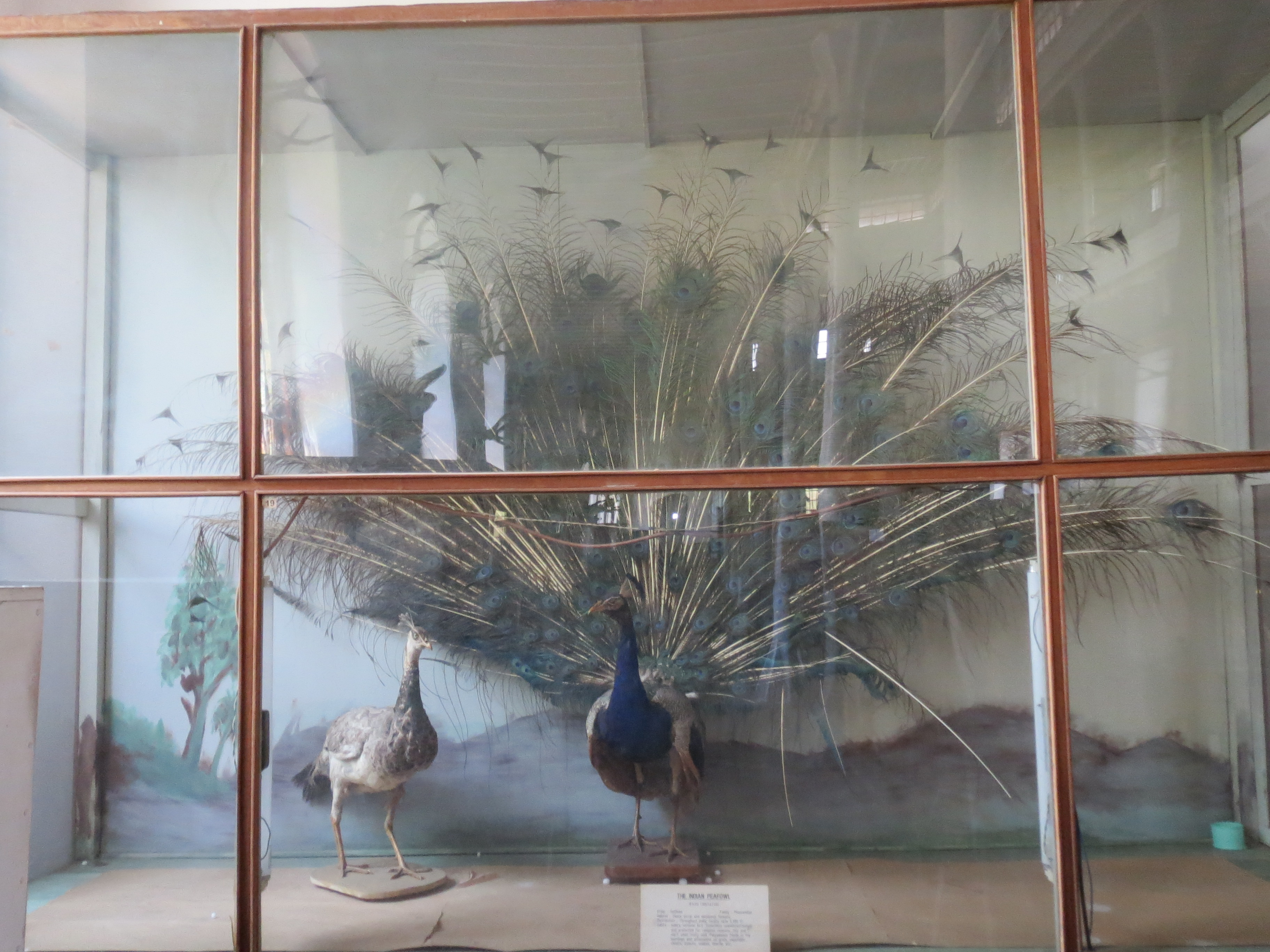
Stuffed peacock and peahen

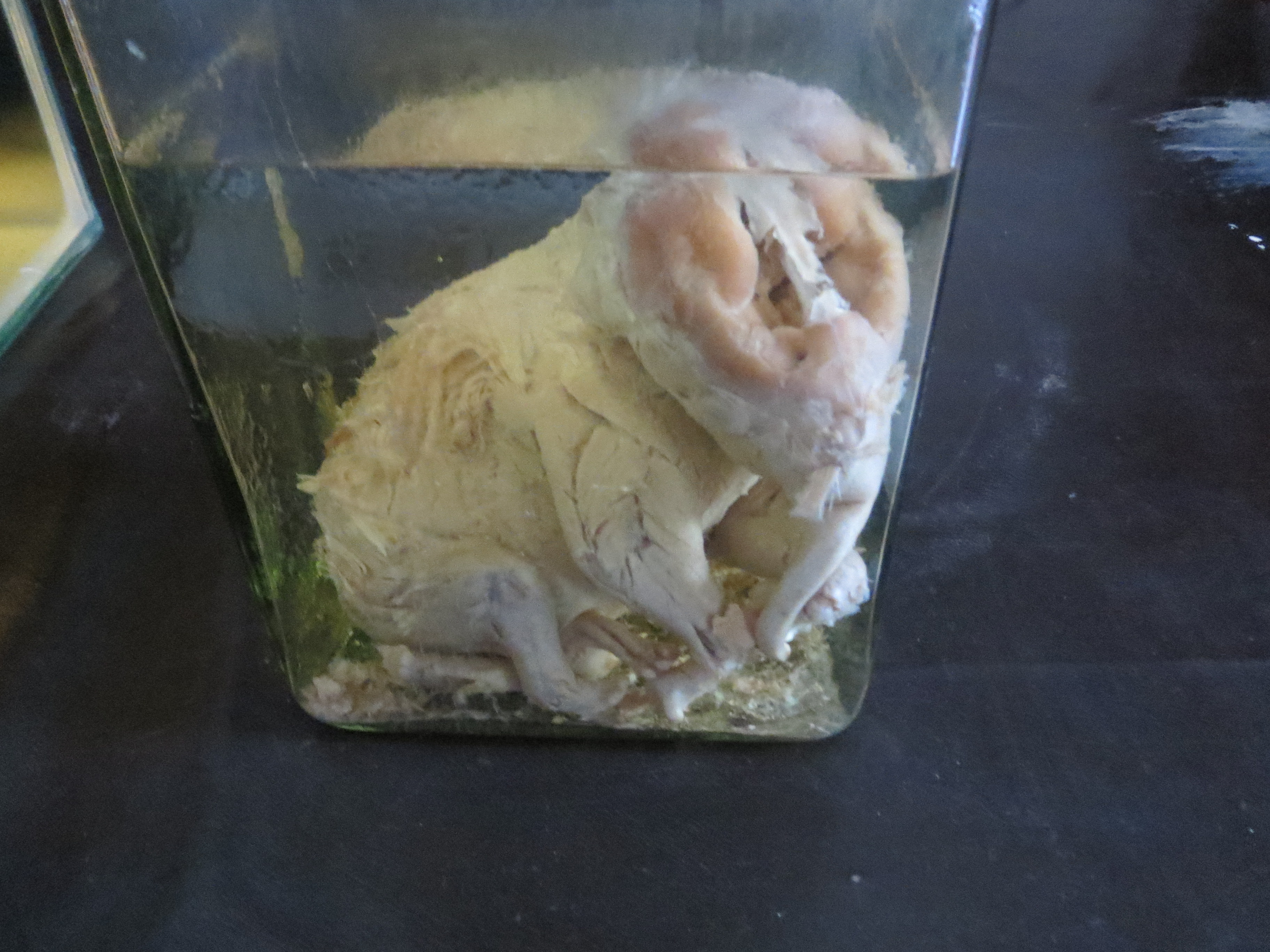
Elephant foetus (gifted by renowned 'elephant doctor' V. Krishnamurthy)

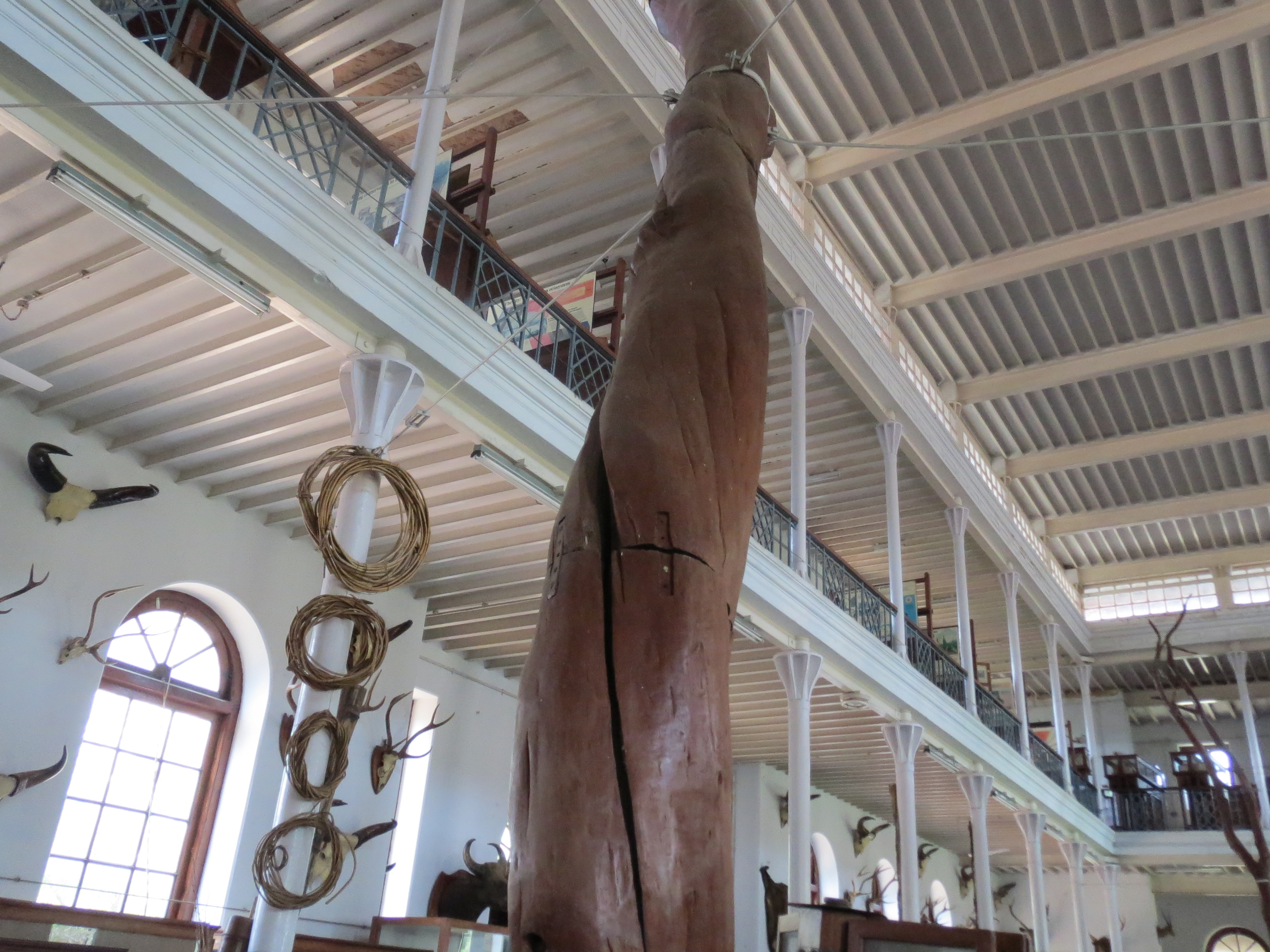
Seasoned trunk of a sandal wood tree

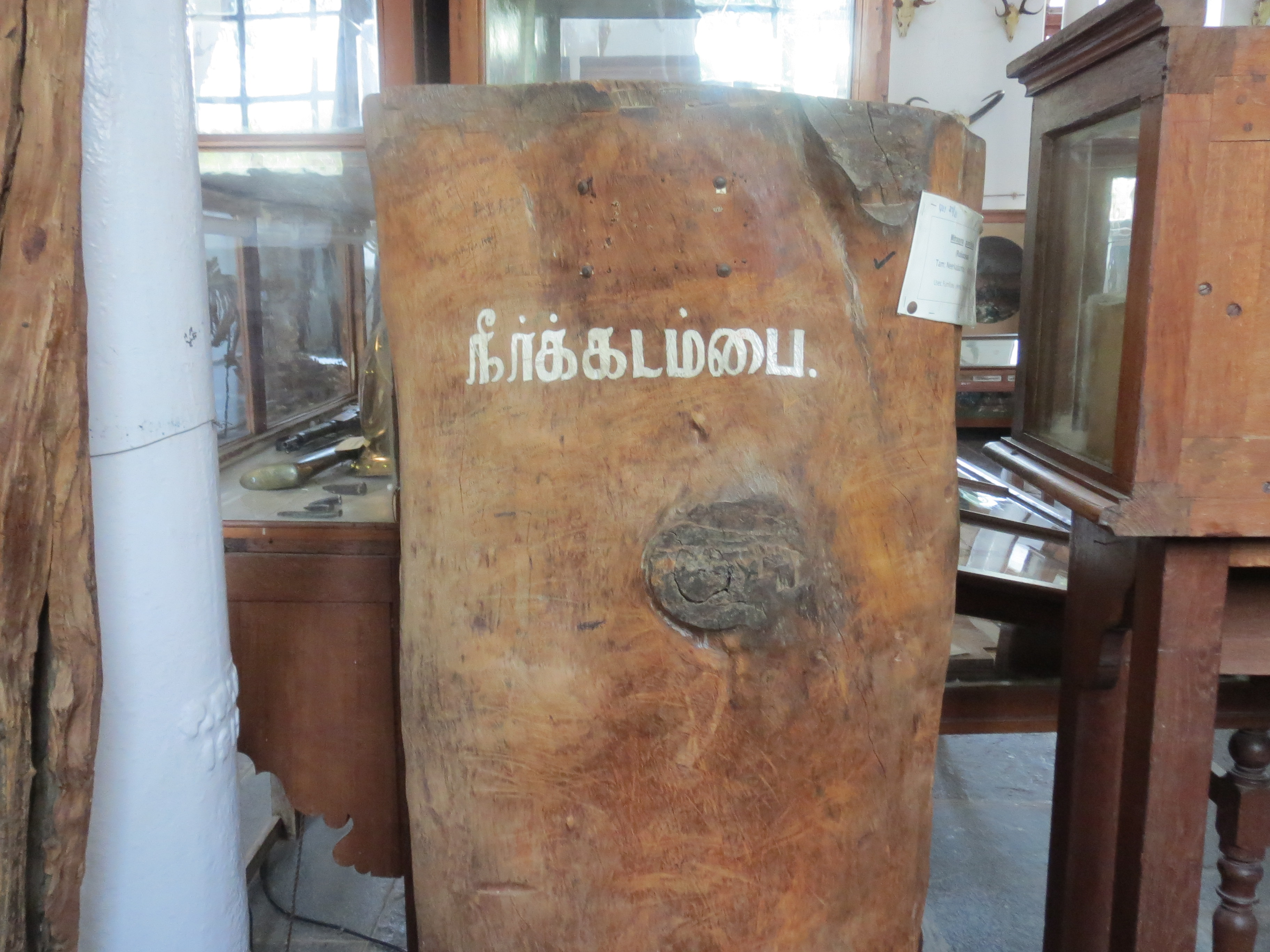
Seasoned specimen of neer kadambai (நீர்க்கடம்பை) tree trunk
