= Trans Rights Now Collective =

Indian transgender rights organization

- Abbreviation: TRNC
- Founder: Grace Banu
- Founded at: Tamil Nadu, India
- Purpose: Advocacy, Support, and Rights for Transgender Individuals
- Headquarters: Tamil Nadu, India
- Region served: India

Trans Rights Now Collective (TRNC) is a Dalit-Bahujan-Adivasi-centered collective of transgender individuals in India which was founded by Grace Banu.

== History ==
Trans Rights Now Collective was founded by Grace Banu, a prominent Dalit and transgender activist. Grace Banu created history by becoming the first transgender person to secure admission to an engineering college in Tamil Nadu.

The collective has been at the forefront of India's trans rights movement, advocating for the rights and visibility of transgender individuals, particularly those from marginalized communities.

== Work ==
Grace Banu and the collective have been vocal in demanding horizontal reservations in education and employment for transgender people. They have argued that clubbing all transgender persons into one category neglects the diversity within the community and the specific caste-based oppression faced by many.

On 17 April 2023, over 15 transgender people, led by Grace Banu, staged a peaceful protest near Chennai's Kalaignar Karunanidhi Memorial. They were "forcefully" detained and "manhandled" by the Chennai Police before being released the same evening. The protest aimed to bring attention to the demand for horizontal reservations for transgender individuals.

In 2022, on 20 November, which is observed as International Transgender Day of Remembrance, the collective presented a play titled "Sandakaranga" in Chennai, Tamil Nadu. the play showcased the harassment, abuse, and assault in that transgender people face in schools, and brought to life the voices of the trans lives lost. The writer and director of this show is the award-winning actress Negha Shahin. The entire production was an effort by the trans community, everything from conception and direction to costume design and acting.
