= Sri Krishna College of Engineering & Technology =

Autonomous Institution in Tamil Nadu, India

Coordinates: 11.0247°N 77.00298°E

Sri Krishna College of Engineering and Technology
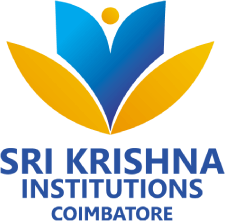
- Crest of SKI
- Motto: Conceptualization to Completion
- Type: Private college
- Established: 1998; 28 years ago
- Affiliations: AICTE, Anna University
- Chairperson: S. Malarvizhi
- Principal: Porkumaran Karantharaj
- Location: Coimbatore, Tamil Nadu, India
- Campus: Urban
- Website: www.skcet.ac.in

Sri Krishna College of Engineering & Technology (SKCET) is a private technical institution affiliated to Anna University based on Coimbatore. It is one of the five institutions within "Sri Krishna Institutions (SKI)". It is located in a twenty-acre campus at Sugunapuram along the Palakkad-Coimbatore Highway, near Kuniyamuthur, Coimbatore in Indian state of Tamil Nadu. The college was started in 1998 with 180 students and 18 staff and offered four courses in the Bachelor of Engineering (B.E.). Qualifications are conferred by Anna University.

At present, the college has more than 2,500 students and more than 200 teaching and non-teaching staff.

== Rankings ==
University and college rankings

Engineering – India
- NIRF (2024): 100

It was ranked 100rd by the NIRF among engineering institutions in 2025.

Ranked 4th out of 5 Private/Self Financed/Technical Colleges/Universities in 2021 in Atal Ranking of Institutions on Innovation Achievements (ARIIA).

== Campus ==
The campus is about 8 km from the city of Coimbatore. The facilities include classrooms with multimedia equipment/overhead projectors, faculty and administrative blocks, a modern library and computer labs, and a three-storey student residence. There are separate blocks for respective departments of engineering. The mechanical department is largest and oldest department at SKCET with a wide range of faculty and students. The mechanical block is the largest among all. It has a research and development lab to design and build vehicles for students who are an active member of SAE (Society of automobile engineers-coimbatore chapter).

== Infrastructure ==
- Approximately 5 lakh sq.ft. of instructional area in classrooms and laboratories
- 20 computer laboratories with 1,200 terminals
- 8 Mbit/s (1:1) leased line Internet connectivity; all the systems in the campus are networked
- 2 Mbit/s dedicated VPN connectivity between the college and Anna University, Coimbatore
- 55,000 sq.ft. of central library block with approximately 42,000 volumes of books and 1,000 periodicals; Internet access to all the e-journals and e-books is enabled
- Food Court
- Library (Venkatraman Learning Centre)
- Stationary, hotels and small book stores
- Gym
- Krishna Square
- Sri Krishna Temple
- Chat Cafe

== Courses Offered ==
SKCET offers 8 Undergraduate courses, 9 Postgraduate Courses and 1 Integrated course.

=== Undergraduate Course ===
- B.E. Computer Science and Engineering
- B.E. Computer Science and Design
- B.E. Mechanical Engineering
- B.E. Mechatronics Engineering
- B.E. Civil Engineering
- B.E. Electrical and Electronics Engineering
- B.E. Electronics and Communication Engineering
- B.Tech. Information Technology
- B.Tech. Computer Science and Business Systems
- B.Tech.Artificial intelligence and Data Science
- B.Tech.Cyber Security
- B.Tech.Artificial intelligence and Machine learning

=== Postgraduate Course ===
- M.E Computer Science and Engineering
- M.E. Software Engineering
- M.E. Applied Electronics
- M.E. Communication Systems
- M.E. Engineering Design
- M.E. CAD/CAM
- M.E. Power Electronics and Drivers
- Master of Business Administration (MBA)
- Master of Computer Application (MCA)

=== Integrated Course (5 Year) ===
- M.Tech. Computer Science and Engineering

== Notable alumni ==
- Athulya Ravi, Actress
