= S. Swapna =

Indian public servant (born 1990)

- Born: 3 July 1990 (age 36); Madurai, India
- Other name: Swapna
- Education: B.A. (Tamil)

S. Swapna (born 3 July 1990) is an Indian public servant. She is the first transgender Gazetted Officer in India. She is also the first transgender person to take the civil services TNPSC recruitment exam for public service employees in the Tamil Nadu state. Swapna is serving as Assistant commissioner of Commercial Tax Department in Tamil Nadu.

== Background ==
Swapna, born in Madurai, Tamil Nadu applied for the TNPSC Group IV Exam in 2012, but the board refused her application because of her transgender gender identity. As a result of this decision, Swapna and Gopi Shankar Madurai on 7 October 2013 carried out a protest in front of Madurai District Collectorate demanding reservation and to permit alternate genders to appear for examinations conducted by TNPSC, UPSC, SSC and Bank Exams. She later filed a petition at the Madurai Bench of the Madras High Court to allow transgender women to take TNPSC exams as female candidates. In 2013, the appeal was successful and she was allowed to take the exam as female candidate, she is the first transgender woman to take this exam.

=== Challenging TNPSC ===
In July 2016, she appeared for the written examinations for the Group-I officers. She was declared unsuccessful but the administration was unable to provide the copy of her answer. She brought the case to the tribunal, and the Madras High Court asked for the complete copy, in the context of massive malpractices.
