= Karpaga =

Karpaga is an actress who made her debut in a Tamil movie called Paal. She is the first trans person ever in India to perform a leading role in a mainstream movie.

== Personal life ==
Karpaga was born in a middle-class family of Erode in western Tamil Nadu, an only child, and left home at 17 for Mumbai. Karpaga worked at a beauty parlour as a beautician after finishing schooling. After returning to her family, five years later, her family was shattered but eventually accepted her.

== Paal ==
Historically, transgender people have been shown in a poor light in Indian movies. Karpaga acts as an intellectual woman who has difficulty in revealing her identity to her lover. The film stresses the need for families to accept transgender people.
