= Natarajapuram =

- Neighborhood
- Country: India
- State: Tamil Nadu
- District: Tiruchirappalli

Government
  - Type: Panchayati raj (India)
  - Body: Gram panchayat

Population (2001)
  - Total: 1,142

Languages
  - Official: Tamil
- Time zone: UTC+5:30 (IST)

Natarajapuram is a neighbourhood of the city of Tiruchirappalli in Tamil Nadu, India. It is situated in the heart of the city.

== Demographics ==
As per the 2001 census, Natarajapuram had a population of 1142 with 568 males and 574 females. The sex ratio was 1011 and the literacy rate, 83.48.
