= Medical Services Recruitment Board =

Organization

Medical Services Recruitment Board மருத்துவ பணியாளர் தேர்வு வாரியம்
- Abbreviation: MRB
- Formation: 2012
- Type: Government
- Purpose: Recruitment
- Location: 7th floor, DMS building, 359, Anna Salai, Chennai – 6, Tamil Nadu
- Region served: Tamil Nadu

The Medical Services Recruitment Board (MRB) was constituted by the government of Tamil Nadu in G.O. (Ms) No.1, Health and Family Welfare (C2) Department dated 02.01.2012 with the objective of making appointments to various categories of staff in the Health and Family Welfare Department by way of direct recruitment, in a speedy manner, keeping in view the nature, importance and essentiality of these posts.

== Organisation ==
The Medical Services Recruitment Board consists of a chairman, a member, and a member secretary. Health and Family Welfare department additional secretary will head the board. A person in the cadre equal to that of medical department deputy director will be its member and an officer equal to the ranks of district revenue officer will be appointed as its member-secretary.

== Recruitment ==
MRB follows two types of direct recruitments:

1.Recruitment through employment exchange

2.Recruitment through open advertisement and competitive examination.

== See also ==
- Tamil Nadu Public Service Commission
- Tamil Nadu Uniformed Services Recruitment Board
- Tamil Nadu Forest Uniformed Services Recruitment Committee
