= K. Prithika Yashini =

Prominent transgender Indian historical figure

K Prithika Yashini is the first transgender woman to be a police officer in India. She became the first trans woman sub-inspector in Tamil Nadu, India.

== Early life ==
Prithika Yashini was born and brought up as the son of a driver-tailor couple in Salem, Tamil Nadu. She had a difficult childhood where her parents took her to temples, doctors, astrologers to 'set things right'. When she was in ninth grade, she felt different and didn't feel like a boy. She completed her undergraduation in computer applications.

In 2011, she ran away to Chennai, where she found acceptance and support in the transgender community of the city.

== Career ==
She began her career in Chennai working as a warden in a women's hostel.

Yashini applied for recruitment as a Tamil Nadu sub-inspector of police to the Tamil Nadu Uniformed Services Recruitment Board (TNUSRB) to fill vacancies for 1087 posts. However, her application was rejected as being a trans woman she did not belong to any of the two specified categories, namely, male or female. Subsequently, she challenged the decision of the TNUSRB in different courts including the High Court of Madras.

Accordingly, the High Court of Madras ordered to conduct a written test for her. The test for the recruitment comprises written test, physical endurance test and a viva-voce. With legal recourse in a competent court, she was able to lower the minimum cut-off marks for written test for such a recruitment from 28.5 to 25.00. She cleared all physical endurance tests except missing 100 meter dash by one second. However, she was testified successful in the physical endurance test.

In terms of judgement of the Madras High Court, which was delivered on 6 November 2015, directions were given to the Tamil Nadu Uniformed Services Recruitment Board (TNUSRB) to appoint K Prithika Yashini as a sub-inspector of police as she is "entitled to get the job". The judgement further directed the TNUSRB to include transgender people as a "third category", apart from the usual category of "male" and "female".

Yashini received the appointment order from Chennai City Police Commissioner Smith Saran in April 2017

In an interview, Prithika Yashini told, "I'm excited. It's a new beginning for the entire transgender community." She aspires to become an officer of Indian Police Service over a period of time.

She took charge as sub-inspector in Dharmapuri district in Tamil Nadu on April 2, 2017 and is posted in the law and order wing.

She got an award from Behindwoods 2019 as Icon of Inspiration for the 1st third gender police officer.
