= Tamil Nadu Public Service Commission =

Constitutional body

Constitutional body overview
- Formed: 1929 (97 years ago)
- Preceding Constitutional body: Madras Public Service Commission
- Type: Constitutional body
- Jurisdiction: Tamil Nadu
- Status: Active
- Headquarters: Chennai; 13.0852°N 80.2820°E
- Constitutional body executives: S.K.Prabakar IAS, Chairman; P. Uma Maheswari IAS, Secretary; Thiru. Kiran Gurrala IAS, Controller of Examinations
- Key document: Constitution of India (Article 315)
- Website: tnpsc.gov.in

The Tamil Nadu Public Service Commission (TNPSC) is a constitutional body of the state of Tamil Nadu, India, responsible for the recruitment of candidates for various state government jobs through competitive examinations. It is the successor of the Madras Service Commission, which came into being under an Act of the Madras Legislature in 1929 and was the first Provincial Public Service Commission in India. It adopted its current name in 1970. TNPSC operates under Articles 315 to 323 of Part XIV of the Constitution of India.

== History ==
In 1923, the Indian Government established a Public Service Commission to examine the salary structure of the Indian Civil Service and the possibility of transferring some of the duties to provincial services. The commission was composed of five Englishmen and four Indians, with Viscount Lee of Fareham serving as chairman. The commission also addressed the rate of Indianisation of the Indian Civil Service and the Indian Police. It determined a recruitment rate to ensure that Indians would constitute 50% of the Indian Civil Service and the Indian Police within 15 and 25 years, respectively.

It was left largely to the discretion of provincial governments to recruit and exercise control over their services, as deemed proper. As a result of the discretionary powers left to provincial Government, the Government of Madras and Punjab proposed to set up their own public service commissions.

Madras Presidency was the first province in India to establish their own service commission when the Madras Service Commission was established under an Act of the Madras Legislature in 1929. The Madras Service Commission started with three members, including the chairman. After re-organisation of the states in 1957, several state level commissions were constituted. In 1957, the Madras Service Commission became the Madras Public Service Commission with its headquarters at Madras. During 1970, when the name of the state was changed to Tamil Nadu, the Madras Public Service Commission was renamed as the Tamil Nadu Public Service Commission (TNPSC).

== Organisation ==
Articles 316 to 319 of the Constitution of India deal with the structure of state public service commissions. TNPSC is headed by a chairman and comprises fourteen other members, all appointed by the Governor of Tamil Nadu, in accordance with the above provisions of the Constitution of India.

The Commission consists of 15 Members including a Chairman.

Departments of TNPSC are headed by a Joint Secretary, Deputy Secretaries and Under Secretaries consisting of sections headed by Section Officers and other subordinate staff.

In a Government Order dated 9 August 2011, the Tamil Nadu government brought the chairman and members of the TNPSC under the purview of the State Vigilance Commission and Directorate of Vigilance and Anti-Corruption.

== Functions ==
The Tamil Nadu Public Service Commission discharges the duties and functions specified in Article 320 of the Constitution of India. The commission is required to advise the Government on all matters relating to framing of recruitment rules, principles to be followed in making appointments and promotions and transfers from one service to another service, in respect of disciplinary matters affecting government servants and to conduct examinations for selection of candidates under direct recruitment to the State, Subordinate and Ministerial Services. The commission conducts departmental examinations for government servants and conducts the examination on behalf of the national Ministry of Defence for admission to the school run by the Rashtriya Indian Military College, Dehra Dun.

The Secretary to the commission holds the responsibility of ensuring implementation of its decisions, besides handling day-to-day administration, departmental promotion committees, oral tests for recruitment etc. The Controller of Exams is responsible for notifying and conducting recruitment and departmental examinations. Controller of exam also responsible for providing TNPSC Hall Ticket which help to identify right candidate during examination and hall ticket help them to prevent any unusual activities in examination.

== Issues ==
=== Counselling ===
To ensure transparency in service/unit allocation, the Commission introduced a Counseling Mode in February 2012.

=== Exam paper leak ===
TNPSC cancelled a Group II examination held on 12 August 2012 following allegations that the question paper had been leaked. This is the first time TNPSC cancelled an examination due to a possible question paper leak.

=== Gender issues ===
Transgender S. Swapna and gender activist Gopi Shankar Madurai staged a protest in Madurai collectorate on 7 October 2013 demanding reservation and to permit alternate genders to appear for examinations conducted by TNPSC, UPSC, SSC and Bank exams. Swapna, had previously successfully moved the Madras High Court in 2013 when seeking permission to write the TNPSC Group II exam as a woman. Swapna is the first trans person to clear the TNPSC Group IV exams.

=== Reforms ===
Tamil Nadu Public Service Commission has introduced a series of reforms to ensure free and fair recruitment process with the highest level of transparency in each stage of selection. Chief Minister Edappadi K. Palaniswami has made the announcements during zero hour in the Assembly on 1 June 2018. The upper age limit for those who appear for the examinations being conducted by the Tamil Nadu Public Service Commission for the services falling under Group I, IA and IB would be raised. For the candidates belonging to the SC/ST/MBC/BC and Denotified Communities, the upper age ceiling would be increased from 35 to 37 and for the rest, the age ceiling would be raised from 30 to 32.

=== Annual Planner ===
Tamil Nadu Public Service Commission has planned to conduct exams to fill around 15,000 posts every year and it will be published in the Tamil Nadu government official site every year 3 December Week and publish exam results in their official website and in the Tamil website for TNPSC

== See also ==
- Public Service Commission in india
- Tamil Nadu Uniformed Services Recruitment Board
- Tamil Nadu Forest Uniformed Services Recruitment Committee
- Medical Services Recruitment Board
- List of Public service commissions in India
