= Kalki Subramaniam =

Actress and activist

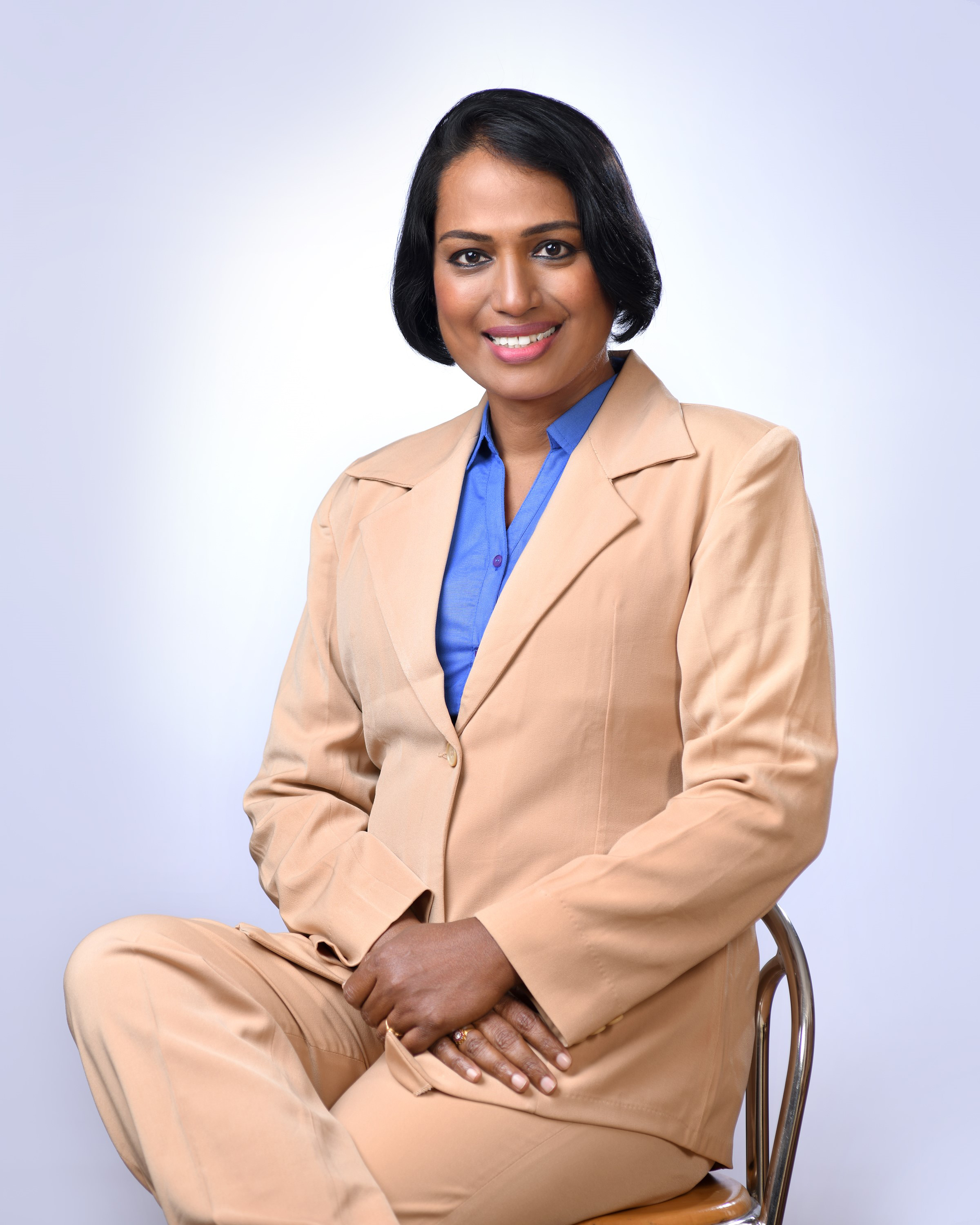
- Kalki Subramaniam during university lecture
- Born: Pollachi, Tamil Nadu, India
- Occupations: Activist, actor, artist and writer
- Years active: Since 2005

Kalki Subramaniam is a transgender rights activist, social worker, artist, actress, writer, inspirational speaker and entrepreneur from Tamil Nadu. She is the founder of Sahodari Foundation, a pioneer organization in India working for transgender persons visibility and empowerment. She was also the southern region representative and member of the National Council for Transgender Persons in India until she resigned from the position protesting against the Transgender protections amendment bill 2026

== Early life ==
Kalki was born in Pollachi, a town in Tamil Nadu. Born into a working-class family, Kalki was an academically bright student. Kalki holds two master's degrees: Masters in Journalism Mass Communication and Masters in International Relations. During her postgraduate studies, she started publishing a monthly magazine in Tamil for transgender women called Sahodari (which means sister). This is the first Tamil magazine published for transgender people in India. Kalki also lived in Auroville for many years.

== Activism ==
From 2005, Kalki has campaigned for transgender rights in India. She is known for her innovative activism using technology, art, films, and literature as tools to voice for transgender empowerment. She was one of India's well-known campaigners behind the Supreme Court of India's judgment legalizing transgender identity. In 2009 when a popular matrimonial website rejected the matrimonial listing of a transgender woman, she took it as a challenge and launched India's first matrimonial website for transgender people. The project was hailed as a bold attempt in upholding transgender people's rights. She has created more than 12 documentary films on LGBT rights and has also appeared in international documentary films. In 2010, she trained many underprivileged transgender women in community journalism and encouraged them to make short documentary films telling their own stories. When she lived in Auroville, she protested against encroachments of village lands by Auroville. In October 2019, Kalki organised the first LGBTQI pride march in Coimbatore city of Tamil Nadu.

== Entrepreneurial ventures ==
In 2008, Kalki founded the Sahodari Foundation, an organization that advocates for transgender people in India. In 2017, Subramaniam found the Thoorikai art project, through which she has trained more than 200 transgender people in creating expressive artworks supporting their livelihood through workshops.

== Film career ==
In 2011, Kalki starred in a lead role in a Tamil film, Narthagi, which focused around the lives of transgender people. She made a special appearance in the 2018 film Sarkar in the song "Oru Viral Puratchi". She is the first transgender woman in India to do a lead role in a motion picture. In 2019, Subramaniam acted in a lead role in a parallel Hindi feature film named Kalashnikov - The Lone Wolf.

== Art ==
Kalki's artworks are considered vibrant and colourful. She has been invited to US, Canada, Netherlands, and Germany to speak on art and activism. In 2016, Subramaniam sold her paintings through a crowdfunding campaign and funded the education of underprivileged transgender women. She uses art to find a voice without words, providing transgender victims of sexual and physical abuse a freedom to express their pain through art called the Red Wall Project, also known as the Shut Up! Show. Hundreds of transgender people have participated in the project across the different States of India and wrote their testimonials on a white paper with a red palm impression to show protest against sexual exploitation. In November 2019, Kalki paid a tribute art show to the late Bollywood actress Sridevi by exhibiting digital portraits of Sridevi. She mentioned that Sridevi has been her inspiration since childhood.

== The Redwall project ==
The Redwall is a project that was found in 2018 by Kalki to make the voices of the transgender and gender-diverse people of India powerful. Kalki and the team of Sahodari Foundation have been interviewing more than 500 transgender and gender-diverse survivors of sexual abuse and assault from various states of India including People living with HIV (PLHIV), documenting their experiences as first-person accounts lives in depth. The stories transgender people painful experiences of bullying, rape and assault are documented by the team. This is a community art project where the participant writes the experience on a handmade paper and imprints their red palm on it. These testimonials are exhibited in academic institutions and galleries for public viewing and to show resistance against abuse.

== Publications ==
In 2015, Kalki's collection of Tamil poems on transgender lives titled Kuri Aruthean (குறி அறுத்தேன்) was published by Vikatan Publications. The collection consisted of 25 poems with line-drawings by Kalki. She has also written number of articles and essays in online and print publications. In 2018, three of her poems from the poetry collection Kuri Aruthean were translated in German language and published in an art journal. Six of her poems from the book were adopted into poetic short films titled Vadu (The Scar) directed by herself. She has also written many articles in Indian print and online publications on LGBT rights in India.

In 2021, Kalki published a collection of her English poems, monologue, essays and art titled 'We are not the Others' which was published by Notion Press. The book has been included in the library of Harvard Kennedy School.

In 2024, Kalki published a collection of her Tamil poems, short stories, essays and art titled 'Oru Thirunangaiyin Diary Kurippu' (ஒரு திருநங்கையின் டைரிக் குறிப்பு) which was published by Thirunangai Press.

In 2025, Kalki released her English book titled 'We will not be Erased' with a foreword by A. R. Murugadoss.

== Awards and recognition ==
In 2010, Kalki received international recognition when she was the official guest of the United States of America as a Human Rights Activist through IVLP and was honoured in the United Nations Office in New York City for her social work. She is also a recipient of achievers award from Coimbatore Lawyers Association.

In 2014, she was chosen by Facebook as one of the 12 inspiring women of the world who used Facebook for community development. In 2016, she was nominated by NDTV for its Woman of Worth Award under the arts category.

In February 2017, she was invited by Harvard Business School, Harvard University to speak on behalf of the sexual minorities, and represent the Indian transgender community. She received a standing ovation for her speech. She shared the chair with Telugu actor and Politician Pawan Kalyan, Manish Malhotra, R Madhavan and Meagan Fallone. Inspired by Kalki's speech Pawan Kalyan later in his interview to the media said, he has plans to start a separate wing for the transgender people in his political party Jana sena of Andhra Pradesh.

In 2018, Subramaniam was invited by Schwules Museum, Germany to present her artworks, poetry films and activism in an Artist Talk with Professor Claudia Reiche. In June 2019, Kalki was invited by TransAmsterdam, a transgender art and culture organisation in Netherlands and was conferred the International Ambassador for Life title by the organisation.

In October 2022, Subramaniam was invited to Harvard University, Cornell University, Yale University, University of Pennsylvania, and Rutgers University to speak on her activism, art, literature and the Indian transgender history.
