= Sahodari Foundation =

Indian charitable organisation

- Formation: July 2008
- Founder: Kalki Subramaniam
- Type: Non-profit organization
- Purpose: Social and economic empowerment of transgender women
- Headquarters: Tamil Nadu, India
- Region served: India
- Services: Education support, scholarships, entrepreneurship support, livelihood development and advocacy
- Methods: Art, literature, films and theatre advocacy
- Award: Kokilavani Memorial Award (2010)

Sahodari Foundation is an Indian organisation which is a pioneer in socially and economically empowering underprivileged transgender women. The organisation was founded by transgender activist and artist Kalki Subramaniam in July 2008 to provide opportunities for education support, scholarships for under privileged transgender students, encouraging entrepreneurship and providing livelihood opportunities through creative skills training and development. The organisation is based in Tamil Nadu state in India. The organisation uses art, literature, films and theatre to advocate for social, economic, and political justice for transgender people and gender-nonconforming people.

== Origin ==
During her postgraduate studies, Kalki started publishing a monthly magazine in Tamil for transgender women called Sahodari. At that time prejudice against the transgender people was high because media projected only stereotyped images of transgender people. She wanted to break it and bring forth the real issues and problems of the transgender community. In her magazine, she wrote on health, wellness, spirituality, employment and education.

== Awards ==
In 2010, Sahodari Foundation received the Kokilavani Memorial Award for its contribution towards transgender rights and activism. The foundation trained transgender people as community video journalists and encouraged them to speak up their stories on visual media through a project called Project Kalki. Many transgender women brought out their voices through video films and the organisation showcased those films in YouTube, blogs and other websites and also screened the films across the country. For this innovative effort, the organisation received an international award for innovation in activism using technology and internet.
