= Recognition of same-sex unions in Kerala =

Kerala does not recognise same-sex marriages or civil unions. However, live-in relationships are not unlawful in Kerala. The Indian Supreme Court has held that adults have a constitutional right to live together without being married, and that police cannot interfere with consenting adults living together. The Kerala High Court has upheld this constitutional right in multiple habeas corpus petitions, notably Sreeja S v. Commissioner of Police in 2018 and Devu G v. State Of Kerala in 2023. In January 2020, a same-sex couple filed a writ petition with the High Court to legalise same-sex marriage.

== Legal history ==
=== Background ===
Marriage in India is governed under several federal laws. These laws allow for the solemnisation of marriages according to different religions, notably Hinduism, Jainism, Buddhism, Christianity, Islam, Sikhism and Zoroastrianism. Every citizen has the right to choose which law will apply to them based on their community or religion. These laws are the Hindu Marriage Act, 1955, the Indian Christian Marriage Act, 1872, the Muslim Personal Law (Shariat) Application Act, 1937, the Anand Marriage Act, 1909 and the Parsi Marriage and Divorce Act, 1936. The Special Marriage Act, 1954 (SMA; Malayalam: പ്രത്യേക വിവാഹ നിയമം, ൧൯൫൪, Pratyēka Vivāha Niyamaṁ) allows civil marriage officers to solemnize and register marriages for all Indian citizens regardless of the religion of either party. Although the vast majority of marriages in India continue to be solemnized and registered under the traditional religious personal laws, the SMA has become popular among interfaith couples, inter-caste couples, and spouses with no religious beliefs. None of these acts explicitly bans same-sex marriage.

On 14 February 2006, the Supreme Court of India ruled in Smt. Seema v. Ashwani Kumar that the states and union territories are obliged to register all marriages performed under the federal laws. The court's ruling was expected to reduce instances of child marriages, bigamy, domestic violence and unlawful abandonment. Subsequently, the Government of Kerala, by order of Governor R. L. Bhatia, published the Kerala Registration of Marriages (Common) Rules, 2008 in the Kerala Gazette on 29 February 2008. The measure provides for the registration of all marriages performed in Kerala, and created local registrars that issue marriage licenses to prospective spouses. Registrars may refuse to issue licenses if the parties fail to meet the requirements to marry under the federal marriage laws. The marriage license form requires the name, nationality, age, date of birth, address, and the previous marital status of the "husband" and the "wife".

Traditional Malayali marriages (വിവാഹം, vivāhaṁ) are deeply rooted in custom and hold significant cultural importance. They involve elaborate pre-wedding preparations and culminate in key rituals, including the tying of the mangala sutra and the saptapadi, though Christian and Muslim communities in Kerala have distinct wedding rituals. Arranged marriage remains the prevailing norm across India, accounting for the vast majority of unions, and often placing pressure on LGBT individuals to marry partners of the opposite sex. Nevertheless, some same-sex couples have participated in traditional marriage ceremonies, although the marriages lack legal status in Kerala. Sonu Soman and Nikesh Pushkaran were married in Guruvayur in July 2018, and in January 2020 filed a writ petition to have their marriage legally recognized in India. A second couple, Nived Antony Chullickal and Abdul Rahim, originally from Bangalore, were married in December 2019. "I really just wanted to get married to my boyfriend and shared pre-wedding photoshoot, firstly, as a message to everyone that it is better to be late than never and second, it is so good to come out and marry your partner. Our wedding was like any other wedding. I also wanted it to be an inspiration for people, so that they too can do the same, and now so many people have called me and I really feel good that I have been an inspiration for all", Chullickal told The News Minute.

=== Live-in relationships ===
Recognition of same-sex unions in India

Live-in relationships (Malayalam: സഹവാസം ബന്ധം, sahavāsaṁ bandhaṁ, pronounced [sɐhɐˈʋaːsɐm ˈbɐn̪d̪ʱɐm], or ലിവ്-ഇന്‍ റിലേഷൻഷിപ്പ്, liv-iṉ ṟilēṣaṉṣippŭ) are not illegal in Kerala. The Indian Supreme Court has held that adults have a constitutional right to live together without being married, that police cannot interfere with consenting adults living together, and that live-in relationships are not unlawful. State courts have upheld this constitutional right, and further ruled that if a couple faces threats from family or the community they may request police protection. However, the Kerala High Court held in 2023 that live-in relationships could not be recognised in the state: "The law is yet to recognise the live-in relationship as marriage. The law accords recognition only if the marriage is solemnised in accordance with personal law or in accordance with secular law like the Special Marriage Act." This means that while couples may live together without being married they cannot access the legal rights and benefits of marriage.

In 2018, the Kerala High Court ruled, in Sreeja S v. Commissioner of Police, that a lesbian couple, Sreeja and Aruna, did not violate the law by living together in a same-sex relationship. The couple had moved in together, but Aruna's parents filed a missing person complaint with the police, and later attempted to send her to a mental hospital in Thiruvananthapuram. During the court proceedings, Aruna clarified that she was living with Sreeja of her own free will. The court held that their live-in relationship did not violate the law, and ordered that the couple be allowed to freely reside together. Likewise, in May 2022, the High Court gave a Muslim lesbian couple, Fathima Noora and Adhila Nasarin, the right to live together. The couple had been forcibly separated by their families, with Noora allegedly being forced into conversion therapy. Nasarin filed a habeas corpus plea, Adhila Nasarin v. Commissioner of Police, stating that "Noora's mother came and showed me a petition saying that I kidnapped her and she will take her back. They are very cruel, they may try to kill her and there were several threats from Noora's family. They even threatened to kill me and my father. Noora was taken away from me by force." In a short proceeding before Justices K. Vinod Chandran and C. Jayachandran, the court issued a judgement in favour of the couple on 31 May. The couple were married in a traditional ceremony in October 2022.

In 2022, a woman from Kaloor filed a habeas corpus plea, Devu G v. State Of Kerala, alleging that her same-sex partner had been illegally detained by her parents. The couple had been together for a year and planned on getting married. On 2 February 2023, the High Court denied the plea and directed the detained partner to attend psychiatric counselling. On 6 February, the plaintiff filed for review with the Indian Supreme Court. In her petition, she stated that the counselling recommended by the High Court "is obviously counselling to change her sexual orientation", and urged her partner's release. On 11 March 2024, the Supreme Court ruled that habeas corpus petitions filed by same-sex partners should be prioritised, that lower courts "shall not pass any directions for counselling or parental care when the corpus is produced before the Court" and that courts must order immediate release without subjecting the plaintiffs to "counseling": "Sexual orientation and gender identity fall in a core zone of privacy of an individual. These identities are a matter of self-identification, and no stigma or moral judgment must be imposed when dealing with cases involving parties from the LGBTQ+ community. Courts must exercise caution in passing any direction or making any comment which may be perceived as pejorative." Further, it ruled that courts "must acknowledge that some intimate partners may face social stigma and a neutral stand of the law would be detrimental to the fundamental freedoms of the appellant. Therefore, a court while dealing with a petition for police protection by intimate partners on the grounds that they are a same sex, transgender, inter-faith, or inter-caste couple must grant an ad-interim measure, such as immediately granting police protection to the petitioners".

=== 2020 writ petition ===
In January 2020, Sonu Soman, an IP professional, and Nikesh Pushkaran, a businessman, filed a writ petition in the Kerala High Court, requesting that their marriage be registered under the Special Marriage Act and arguing that preventing same-sex couples from marrying violates the principles of equality, non-arbitrariness, non-discrimination, individual dignity and personal autonomy under Articles 14, 15(1), 19(1)(a) and 21 of the Constitution of India. The couple, originally from the Ernakulam district, had sought to marry at the Guruvayur Temple, but authorities refused to solemnize the marriage and issue a certificate. They married in a secret ceremony in a car parking area of the temple in July 2018. Citing the Supreme Court's ruling in Navtej Singh Johar v. Union of India, which decriminalized homosexuality in India in 2018 and recognized a person's right to be treated with dignity regardless of sexual orientation, the couple argued that exclusion from the institution of marriage denies them basic rights and privileges such as maintenance, inheritance, pension and joint bank accounts: "The institution of marriage affords certain rights and privileges to the persons in matrimony in the society and due to the aforesaid exclusion, the homosexual couples like the petitioners are denied an opportunity to enjoy similar rights and privileges. Being married carries along with it the right to maintenance, right of inheritance, a right to own joint bank accounts, lockers; nominate each other as a nominee in insurance, pension, gratuity papers etc. All these are unavailable to the Petitioners due to their exclusion from the institution of marriage, making the said exclusion more discriminatory." The couple filed the writ on 24 January with Justice Anu Sivaraman.

By October 2022, the Kerala Government had not yet filed a response to the writ petition. Soman and Pushkaran wrote to Chief Minister Pinarayi Vijayan, but likewise did not receive a response. In November 2022, the Deputy Solicitor General announced that the government was taking steps to get the writ petition transferred to the Supreme Court of India. The petition was consolidated into a broader case titled Supriyo v. Union of India. In October 2023, the Supreme Court delivered a landmark decision in Supriyo, ruling that the legalisation of same-sex marriage was a matter for Parliament to address, not the judiciary. It declined to review its decision on 9 January 2025.

=== Transgender and intersex issues ===
Kerala historically did not recognize a traditional third gender community known as hijra (ഹിജ്റ, hijṟa), who hold respected community roles in North India and are known for their distinct culture, communities led by gurus, and traditional roles as performers. Gender fluidity (notably the theyyam ritual where a male performer embodies femineity and is viewed as transcending biological sex), eunuchs (നപുംസക, napuṁsaka) and transgender people were present in Kerala conceptually, but never extended to a hijra structure due to the absence of a Persian-Islamic court culture and eunuch administration in royal households in Kerala. In February 2023, the state government said it would introduce legislation amending the Kerala Registration of Marriages (Common) Rules, 2008 to allow transgender people to marry. A marriage ceremony for a transgender couple had already taken place in Thiruvananthapuram in May 2018. As both partners were transgender, authorities allowed it to be solemnised under the SMA as an opposite-sex marriage. The Supreme Court's 2023 ruling in Supriyo v. Union of India held that the Indian Constitution does not require the legalisation of same-sex marriages but affirmed that transgender people may marry opposite-sex partners.

== Public opinion ==
According to a 2019 report titled "Politics and Society Between Elections 2019", published by the Azim Premji Foundation and the Centre for the Study of Developing Societies, 58% of participants from the state opposed same-sex relationships; the fourth highest among the twelve states surveyed. The 2021 Mathrubhumi Youth Manifesto Survey conducted on people aged between 15 and 35 showed that 74.3% of respondents supported legalising same-sex marriage, while 25.7% were opposed.

== See also ==
- LGBT rights in Kerala
- LGBT rights in India
- Recognition of same-sex unions in India
- Supriyo v. Union of India
