= Recognition of same-sex unions in India =

India does not recognise same-sex marriage, civil unions or other forms of partnerships. Several same-sex couples have married in traditional Hindu ceremonies since the late 1980s; however, these marriages are not registered with the state and couples do not enjoy all the same rights and benefits as married opposite-sex couples. A two-judge bench of the Supreme Court of India in August 2022, while giving a ruling on an unrelated matter (maternity leave), made a non-binding observation that the definition of a family unit includes opposite-sex and same-sex live-in relationships, declaring them equally entitled to social welfare benefits.

In October 2023, the Supreme Court declined to legalise same-sex marriage or civil unions and left the matter up to the Parliament or the state legislatures to decide. Despite the legal requirement to register all marriages with the government, the majority of Hindu marriages are not registered with the government and are instead conducted through unwritten common law.

Since the 2010s, courts in several states, including Gujarat, Himachal Pradesh, Kerala, Odisha, Punjab, Uttar Pradesh, and Uttarakhand, have ruled on an individual basis that live-in relationships between same-sex couples are not unlawful and entitled to legal protection. This has often only entailed limited inheritance benefits or police protection from family. Courts have also recognised guru–shishya, nātā prathā or maitri karar-type contractual relationships.

== Background ==
Marriage as a legal construct was codified during colonialism for the purpose of regulating divorce proceedings. Prior to this, there were numerous conceptions of relationships including cohabitation and marriage.

=== Hinduism ===
According to the Pew Research Center, though some modern Hindus condemn same-sex marriage, others cite ancient Hindu texts, such as the Kama Sutra, that seem to condone homosexual behaviour. There have been reports of Hindu gurus performing same-sex marriages in India since at least the 1980s. Despite the legal requirement to register all marriages with the government, the majority of Hindu marriages are not registered with the government and are instead conducted through unwritten common law.

=== Buddhism ===
Buddhism views marriage as a secular topic and hence conceptions of marriage vary between cultures and societies. In some Buddhist-Hindu cultures, marriage was considered to be a secular issue not sanctioned by religion. There is widespread evidence of same-sex cohabitation in the Kingdom of Kandy due to tolerance of "eating together" (i.e. "living together in the same house and sharing the same means"), though it has been argued that this was not of a homosexual nature but rather of a fraternal nature. The Sinhalese people generally did not take marriage seriously, and cohabitation was widespread with marriage being considered a by-product of successful cohabitation, which is in-line with the Buddhist view of the secular concept of marriage. Unmarried cohabitation in Dutch India (including Sri Lanka) became a punishable offence from the Dutch colonial period in 1580. Writing for the Journal of Religious Studies in 2022, Andi Fian, an alumnus from the Gadjah Mada University, argued that prohibitions against same-sex marriage in Chinese Buddhism stem from Confucianism, and that studies of Buddhism and Hinduism in India and Sri Lanka show no such prohibitions existed there.

== Live-in relationships ==
Couples in "live-in relationships" are not married to each other but live together as a cohabiting couple. Live-in relationships tend to be viewed by Indian society as taboo, but have become gradually more common among the younger population in light of the slow decline of arranged marriages. Unlike marriages, live-in relationships are not regulated by law and lack a robust, legally protected system. No law lays down the rights, benefits and commitments for parties in a live-in relationship. However, court judgments and various pieces of legislation offer various rights to such couples. The Protection of Women from Domestic Violence Act, 2005 grants domestic violence protections to women who live in a "relationship in the nature of marriage". Courts have interpreted this expression as covering live-in relationships. Following amendments in the early 2000s, the term "wife" under the Criminal Procedure Code, 1973 includes women who have been in live-in relationships for a "sensible period of time" for the purpose of alimony. In 2020, the Orissa High Court ruled in Chinmayee Jena v. State of Odisha that women in live-in relationships are protected under the 2005 domestic violence law similarly to different-sex cohabiting couples.

Since the 2010s, courts in several states, including Gujarat, Himachal Pradesh, Kerala, Odisha, Punjab, Uttar Pradesh, and Uttarakhand, have ruled on an individual basis that live-in relationships between same-sex couples are not unlawful and entitled to legal protection. This has often only entailed limited inheritance benefits or police protection from family. Courts have also recognised guru–shishya, nātā prathā or maitri karar-type contractual relationships. While ruling on a maternity leave matter in Deepika Singh vs Central Administrative Tribunal and Others on 16 August 2022, a two-judge bench of the Supreme Court observed that the definition of a family unit includes opposite-sex and same-sex live-in relationships, declaring them equally entitled to social welfare benefits. In addition, a number of companies provide services to cohabiting same-sex couples, including financial benefits, and health care benefits. On 28 August 2024, the Ministry of Finance clarified that persons in same-sex live-in relationships can open joint bank accounts and name their partners to be beneficiaries of an account in case of death. The Department of Food and Public Distribution has also advised state and territorial governments to recognize partners in same-sex relationships as members of the same household for ration card purposes.

== Federal marriage laws ==
The following acts cover India's marriage laws:

- The Indian Christian Marriage Act, 1872 (ICMA): regulates the marriage and divorce of Indian Christians. An ordained minister of a church or a marriage registrar may conduct marriages under the Act.
- Special Marriage Act, 1954 (SMA): provides a special form of marriage for all Indian citizens regardless of religion. Marriages contracted under this Act are registered with the state as a civil contract. The Act applies to interfaith couples, partners of all religions or with no religious beliefs.
- Hindu Marriage Act, 1955 (HMA): regulates marriage, separation and divorce for Hindus according to Hindu custom and rites. The Act also applies to Sikhs, Jains, and Buddhists.
- Parsi Marriage and Divorce Act, 1936: regulates marriage and divorce for Parsis under Zoroastrian rites.
- Anand Marriage Act, 1909: regulates marriage for Sikhs.
- Muslim Personal Law (Shariat) Application Act, 1937: regulates marriage, succession and inheritance for Muslims.

On 1 April 2022, MP Supriya Sule from the Nationalist Congress Party introduced a bill to the Lok Sabha to legalise same-sex marriage under the Special Marriage Act. The proposal would amend various sections of the Act to provide same-sex couples with the same legal rights as opposite-sex couples. The bill would fix the marriageable age at 21 for gay couples and at 18 for lesbian couples. No action was taken on the bill.

=== Uniform Civil Code ===
In 2017, a draft of a uniform civil code to legalise same-sex marriage was proposed by a group of citizens. Under the proposed code, marriage was defined as "the legal union as prescribed under this Act of a man with a woman, a man with another man, a woman with another woman, a transgender with another transgender or a transgender with a man or a woman". A partnership was similarly defined as the "living together of a man with a woman, a man with another man, a woman with another woman, a transgender with another transgender or a transgender with a man or a woman". It provided that any two persons who have been in a partnership for more than two years shall have the same rights and obligations as married couples, and mandated that all marriages be registered with the state. The draft stated that "all married couples and couples in a partnership are entitled to adopt a child. The sexual orientation of the married couple or the partners are not to be a bar to their right to adoption. Non-heterosexual couples will be equally entitled to adopt a child." Finally, the code provided for the repeal of all of India's marriage-related laws (the Hindu Marriage Act, the Hindu Succession Act, the Muslim Personal Law (Shariat) Application Act, The Indian Christian Marriage Act, among others). The draft was submitted to the Law Commission of India for consideration.

Whether India should adopt the Uniform Civil Code is a matter of ongoing political debate. The Bharatiya Janata Party (BJP) supports a uniform civil code and was the first party in India to do so. The Law Commission began soliciting public views and requests on the issue on 19 March 2018, and later extended the deadline for opinions to 6 May 2018. Muslim groups oppose a uniform civil code because such a code would ban triple talaq, polygamy and would not be based on Sharia law, unlike current Muslim personal law, which governs Indian Muslims. The Law Commission of India stated on 31 August 2018 that a uniform civil code is "neither necessary nor desirable at this stage" in a 185-page consultation paper. In February 2020, Union Minister Ravi Shankar Prasad said that "presently there is no proposal to legalise same-sex marriage", adding that the Union Government was not considering the issue. In September 2023, media reported that the Law Commission had excluded same-sex marriages from a draft uniform civil code.

== State and territory laws ==
Laws regarding homosexuality in Asia Same-sex sexual activity legal Marriage performed Marriage recognized Other type of partnership Unregistered cohabitation No recognition of same-sex couples Restricted or ambiguous Restriction on freedom of expression, not enforced Severe restriction of association with arrests or detention Same-sex sexual activity illegal Prison, not enforced Prison Death penalty on books, not enforced Enforced death penalty

Further complicating matters, the states and union territories of India have their own laws with regard to the registration of marriages and marriages contracted under indigenous customs and rites. In February 2006, the Supreme Court of India ruled in Smt. Seema v. Ashwani Kumar that the states and union territories are obliged to register all marriages performed under the federal laws. The court's ruling was expected to reduce instances of child marriages, bigamy, domestic violence and unlawful abandonment. However, a majority of Hindu marriages performed in India are not registered with the government despite registration being mandatory, and are instead conducted through unwritten common law. Several same-sex couples have held traditional Hindu marriage ceremonies throughout India since the late 1980s, but these marriages lack legal recognition. Family reactions range from support to disapproval to violent persecution.

In Supriyo v. Union of India, the Indian Supreme Court ruled that the legislatures of the states and union territories may legalise same-sex marriage in the absence of federal legislation.

=== Andaman and Nicobar Islands ===
In 1958, the Chief Commissioner published the Andaman And Nicobar Islands Hindu Marriage Registration Rules, 1958, commonly known as the Marriage Rules, (Note: Hindi: विवाह नियम, Vivāh Niyam, pronounced [ʋɪˈʋaːɦ nɪˈjəm]; Bengali: বিবাহ নিয়ম, Bibaho Niẏom, pronounced [ˈbibaɦo ˈni̯om]; Car: Chööngö Inpihö, pronounced [ˈcɤːŋɤ inˈpihɤ]) requiring the registration of all Hindu marriages performed in the Andaman and Nicobar Islands. The Rules do not explicitly ban same-sex marriage, but generally assume married spouses to be "husband and wife". The Marriage Officier has also been instructed to register all marriages in accordance with the Supreme Court's ruling in Smt. Seema, including marriages performed under the SMA.

=== Andhra Pradesh ===
In 2002, the Andhra Pradesh Legislature (which consists of the Legislative Council and the Legislative Assembly) passed the Andhra Pradesh Compulsory Registration of Marriages Act, 2002, which was later signed into law by Governor C. Rangarajan. The Act defines marriage as "all marriages performed by persons belonging to any caste or religion and also the marriages performed as per any custom, practices or any traditions including the marriages performed in the tribal areas and the word 'marriage' also includes 'remarriage'". The Act generally refers to married spouses as "bride and bridegroom".

In October 2007, two women got married in a temple in Visakhapatnam in the presence of the mother of one of the brides and another witness. The two women were workers in a church and they exchanged bibles in accordance with local Christian custom. When the church found out about their relationship, they were dismissed from their jobs. On 18 December 2021, two men, Supriyo Chakraborty and Abhay Dang, were married in a Hindu ceremony in Hyderabad, the de jure capital of Andhra Pradesh, making "it the first gay wedding in the Telugu States". Their wedding was attended by family members and close friends. "Our parents weren't initially the most supportive. However, they also didn't disapprove of it either. They decided to give us and themselves a good amount of time to introspect and come to a better conclusion. Now, we have their acceptance.", Chakraborty said. The marriage is not legally recognised. In August 2022, a lesbian couple were married in a traditional Hindu ceremony in Srikalahasti, though the marriage lacks legal recognition. One of the women had previously been married to a man, but after meeting each other they decided to elope. They later asked for police protection in Vempalle.

Shiva shakti (Telugu: శివ శక్తి, pronounced [ˈʃiʋa ˈʃakt̪i]) are a hijra community living in Andhra Pradesh. Every autumn during a three-day festival performed across Andhra Pradesh and Telangana, they are married to a sword that represents male power or Shiva, becoming the brides of the sword. One of the avatars of Shiva, a central figure in Hinduism, is Ardhanarishvara, who is depicted as half-man and half-woman, representing Shiva united with his shakti. The shiva shakti identify with this form of Shiva and worship at Shiva temples. The religious meaning of the shiva shakti role is expressed in several Hindu stories, including those of Arjuna, Shiva, Bahuchara Mata and Krishna. Most people in this community belong to lower socio-economic status and live as astrologers, soothsayers, and spiritual healers.

=== Arunachal Pradesh ===
In 2008, the Arunachal Pradesh Legislative Assembly passed the Arunachal Pradesh Recording of Marriage Act, 2008, which was later signed into law by Governor J. J. Singh. The Act does not explicitly ban same-sex marriage and defines marriage simply as including remarriage. The Act generally refers to married spouses as "the male partner" and "the female partner".

Arranged marriage is the dominant form of marriage in many tribes of Arunachal Pradesh, including the Nyishi, Hruso, Wancho, and Galo peoples. (Note: Nyeda is the core of the marriage system in Nyishi culture, and involves various rituals and betrothal gifts. Among the Hruso, arranged marriage (Hruso: mukho kiinye gzeeu) involves a negotiator, usually a relative of the groom or an elderly community member, being called upon to visit the bride's household and negotiate the marriage proposal on behalf of the groom's parents. The Wancho and Galo similarly recognise negotiation marriage (Wancho: arut toisam; Gallong: nyida tatnam) where the parents decide the marriage without the consent of their child.) While some of these cultures also practice, or historically practiced, polygyny, they are no known occurrences of same-sex marriages as understood from a Western perspective being performed in these cultures.

=== Assam ===
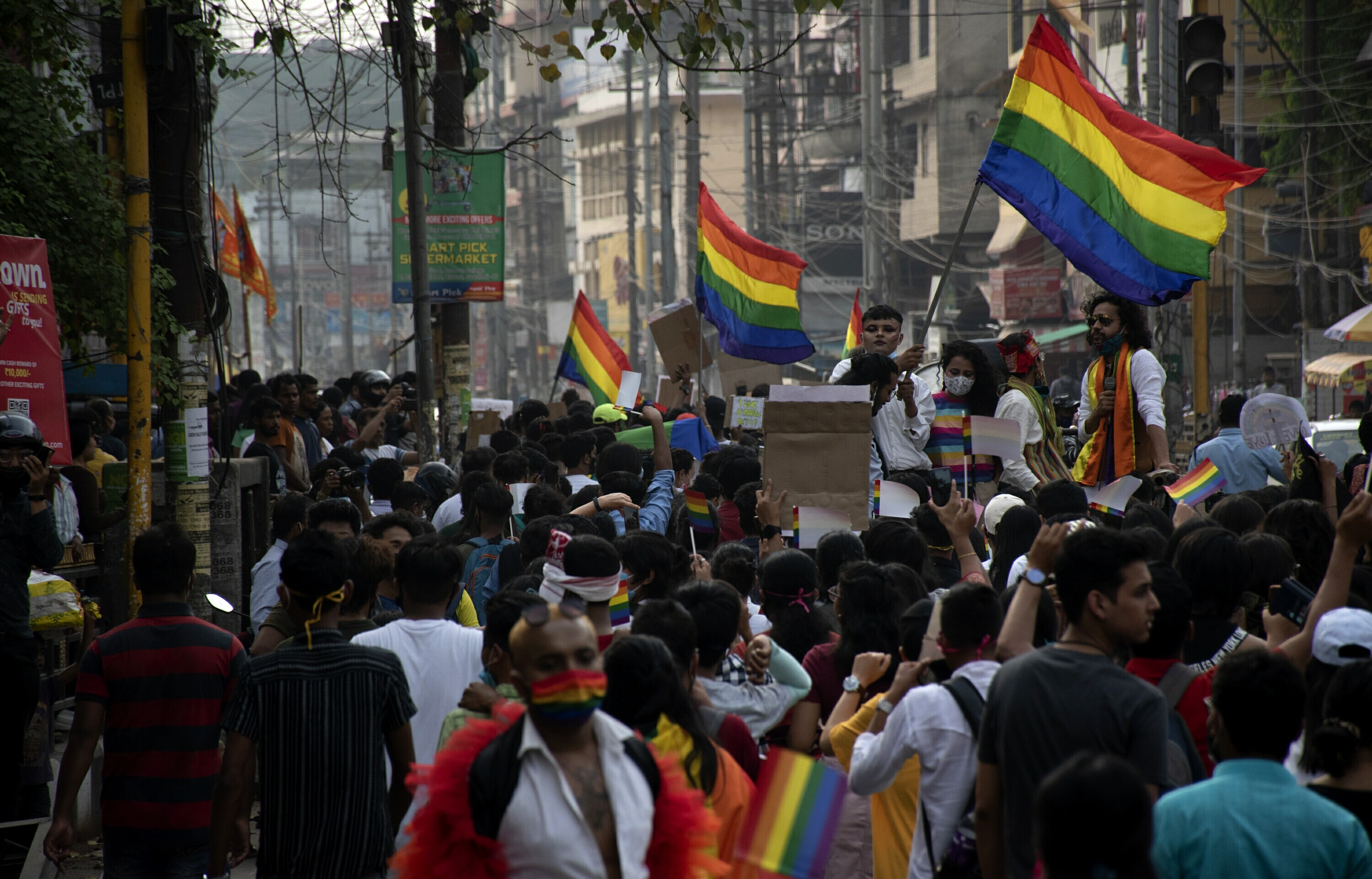
Participants at Queer Pride Guwahati campaigning for LGBT rights and same-sex marriage, 2021

The Government of Assam has fully complied with the Supreme Court's ruling in Smt. Seema v. Ashwani Kumar by amending the Hindu Marriage Rules, 1961, requiring the registration of all Hindu marriages performed in Assam. The state has also passed legislation requiring the compulsory registration of Muslim marriages, Sikh marriages, and marriages performed under the Special Marriage Act, 1954 (Assamese: বিশেষ বিবাহ আইন, ১৯৫৪, Bixex Bibah Ain, 1954, pronounced [ˈbixɛx ˈbibaɦ aɪn]; Bodo: जरʼखा जुलि बिथोनमा, 1954, Jarôkha Juli Bithŵnama, 1954). In May 2023, the state government expressed its opposition to same-sex marriage while the Indian Supreme Court was debating its legalisation in Supriyo.

In 1999, a Boro lesbian couple, Thingring Basumatary and Roinathi, were married in a Hindu temple in Kokrajhar in the Bodoland Territorial Region. The marriage lacks legal recognition, and the couple were shunned by their families and fellow villagers, and later relocated to another village to avoid harassment and ostracization. In 2009, Roinathi was quoted as saying, "We are both very happy and now even the society where we live accepts us and treats us well." In May 2023, as the Supreme Court was hearing oral arguments in Supriyo, two young women from Guwahati, Manisha Rabha and Eliza Wahid, publicly announced their engagement. The announcement went viral on social media.

=== Bihar ===
In August 2006, Governor R. S. Gavai ordered the publication of the Bihar Marriage Registration Rules, 2006. The Rules provide for the registration of all marriages solemnized in Bihar irrespective of the religion of the parties. They do not explicitly define marriage but generally refer to married spouses as "husband and wife". The ruling party of Bihar, the centre-left Rashtriya Janata Dal (RJD) party, does not have an official stance on same-sex marriages. In May 2023, RJD Vice-President Shivanand Tiwari expressed his support for same-sex marriage.

Many same-sex couples in Bihar resort to "marriages by elopement" (पलायन विवाह, palāyan vivāh, Hindi: [pəˈlaːjən ʋɪˈʋaːɦ]; Maithili: [pəˈlaːjən ʋɪˈʋaːɦ]) to avoid family harassment and opposition. In 2017, two women received media coverage after marrying in a traditional Hindu ceremony in Bidupur. The parents of both spouses filed separate court cases to urge the police to separate the couple. A court ordered one of the partners to be jailed for "luring a minor into marriage" as the other woman was a minor at the time. The couple is believed to have eloped to Delhi. A similar case had previously occurred in 2013 when a lesbian couple married in Patna and eloped to avoid family harassment. In 2022, two men, Angrej Kumar and Rupesh Sad, married in a traditional Hindu ceremony in the Khagaria district to strong opposition from family members who forced the couple to separate.

=== Chandigarh ===
In July 2020, the Punjab and Haryana High Court, which has jurisdiction over the union territory of Chandigarh, ruled in Manjinder Kaur and Another vs State of Punjab and Others that same-sex couples are entitled to live-in relationships and protection of their lives and liberty. The court did not comment on the legality of the relationship of the petitioners, a lesbian couple living in Ludhiana, Punjab, but ruled that the couple was entitled to protection of their lives and liberty as provided by Article 21 of the Constitution. In Pooja and Another vs. State of Punjab and Others, the High Court ruled in August 2023 that "Article 21 of the Constitution on protection of life and personal liberty [does] not cease to apply when people of the same gender decide to live together.", ordering police to protect a lesbian couple from "potential threats to their lives".

=== Chhattisgarh ===
The Government of Chhattisgarh published the Chhattisgarh Compulsory Registration of Marriages Rules, 2006 in November 2006. The Rules provide for the registration of all marriages solemnized in Chhattisgarh irrespective of the religion of the parties. They define marriage as "all marriages solemnized, performed or contracted between a male and a female, irrespective of the religion or caste of either party to the marriage, and also includes marriages performed as per law, custom practice or any tradition of either party to the marriage and includes a re-marriage."

In March 2019, fifteen transgender women were married to their cisgender partners in a mass traditional Hindu ceremony in Raipur, although the marriages lack legal recognition. Mayor Madhu Kinnar of Raigarh attended the event and congratulated the couples, "This should have happened a long time ago because we transgender [people] don't have anybody to share out joys and sorrows. Nobody understands our sorrows. Today the government has given us such a good scheme and has given us an opportunity to get married. I thank them profusely."

=== Delhi ===
In July 2019, the Delhi High Court dismissed a legal challenge brought forward by advocates Tajinder Singh and Anurag Chauhan seeking directions to make rules and regulations to recognise same-sex marriages under the HMA.

Petitioners Abhijit Iyer Mitra, Gopi Shankar Madurai, Giti Thadani and G. Oorvasi filed Abhijit Iyer Mitra & Ors v. Union of India in the Delhi High Court in 2020 asserting a right to marriage for same-sex couples under the HMA in Delhi. "[S]aid Act does not distinguish between heterosexual and homosexual marriage if one were to go by how it has been worded. It very clearly states that marriage can indeed be solemnised between 'any two Hindus'. In this view of the matter, it can be stated that it is against the constitutional mandate of non-arbitrariness if the said right is not extended to homosexual apart from heterosexual couples," the petition, represented by lawyers Raghav Awasthi and Mukesh Sharma, said. The petition sought a declaration stating that Section 5 of the HMA did not distinguish between homosexual and heterosexual couples and the right of same-sex couples to marry should be recognised under the Act. In November 2020, the Delhi High Court asked the Union Government to file an official response to the petition.

In October 2020, a lesbian couple, medical practitioners Kavita Arora and Ankita Khanna, filed a lawsuit, Dr Kavita Arora & Anr v. Union of India, with the Delhi High Court seeking a declaration that the SMA ought to apply to couples irrespective of gender and sexual orientation. The petitioners, represented by senior advocate Maneka Guruswamy and lawyers Arundhati Katju, Govind Manoharan and Surabhi Dhar, contended that the SMA in denying recognition of same-sex marriages constituted an infringement of Articles 14, 15, 19 and 21 of the Indian Constitution. The couple asserted that Articles 19 and 21 of the Constitution of India protect the right to marry a person of one's choice, and this right should apply to same-sex couples, just as it does to opposite-sex couples. The petitioners also contended that the exclusion of same-sex marriage from the SMA violates Article 14 and 15 of the Constitution pursuant to the Supreme Court's decision in Navtej Singh Johar v. Union of India that sexual orientation and gender identity are protected under the fundamental right of equality. Because they are unable to marry, the couple cannot own a house together, open a bank account or access family life insurance. The High Court sought responses from the Union Government on the plea. In Vaibhav Jain & Anr v. Union of India, two gay men, Vaibhav Jain and Parag Vijay Mehta, who had married in Washington, D.C. in 2017, contended that the Foreign Marriage Act, 1969 should be perused to apply to same-sex relationships. The High Court asked the Union Government and the Consulate General of India in New York City to respond to the petition.

The Delhi High Court set a hearing for all three petitions on 8 January 2021. On that day, Justices Rajiv Sahai Endlaw and Sanjeev Narula granted "one last opportunity" to the Union Government to file official responses to the three petitions. The court scheduled further deliberations for 25 February 2021. The Union Government was represented by Solicitor General Tushar Mehta. On 25 February, the government asked the Delhi High Court to dismiss the cases, arguing in its response that marriage is based on "age-old customs, rituals, practices, cultural ethos and societal values" and that there thus exists a "legitimate state interest" in preventing same-sex couples from marrying. A fourth petition, Udit Sood and Ors. v. Union of India and Anr, was filed in February 2021. The petitioners, three men and one woman, represented by advocates Meghna Mishra and Tahira Karanjawala, asked the court to declare that the SMA applies to any two persons who wish to marry regardless of sex. Justices Rajiv Sahai Endlaw and Amit Bansal asked the government to respond to the petition. On 24 May 2021, the government asked the court to delay deliberations on the four petitions, stating that "nobody is dying because of the lack of marriage registration" and that the government's focus were on "urgent and immediate" pandemic-related issues. A fifth petition, Joydeep Sengupta v. Union of India & Ors, was filed by Joydeep Sengupta, an Overseas Citizen of India (OCI), and his American partner Russell Blaine Stephens in July 2021. The couple argued that the Citizenship Act, 1955 does not distinguish between different-sex and same-sex spouses and that the same-sex spouse of an OCI should be eligible to apply for an OCI card. The plea further claimed that the Foreign Marriage Act violated Articles 14 and 21 of the Constitution of India in excluding the recognition of foreign same-sex marriages. On 6 July 2021, the division bench of Chief Justice Dhirubhai Naranbhai Patel and Justice Jyoti Singh listed the petitions for hearing on 27 August.

On 25 October 2021, the High Court granted time for the petitioners to file replies and rejoinders to the government's arguments. It set a final hearing for 30 November. Instead, that day, advocates representing the couples asked that the proceedings be live streamed, arguing that "the issue at hand before this [Honourable Court] is of such magnitude and ramification, that live streaming of the said proceedings shall not only have a larger outreach but also help in spreading awareness". On 31 March 2022, Acting Chief Justice Vipin Sanghi and Justice Navin Chawla ordered the government to respond within two weeks to the application seeking live streaming of the proceedings. In an affidavit, the government opposed live-streaming the proceedings, stating that the "applicants were attempting to create a dramatic impression of the proceedings before the court and to win sympathy", adding that the matter was not of "national importance". On 17 May, the court objected to the government's "highly objectionable comments"; the government said it would file a new response. Advocates representing the couples said the government's statements demean the rights of same-sex couples, "I am troubled that the government of India should use words like sympathy, hallucination, you are sensationalising. You may agree or disagree on live streaming but please don't trivialise and demean the people who have struggled for years till the constitution bench of the apex court recognised their rights", said senior advocate Neeraj Kishan Kaul. The next hearing was scheduled for 20 August 2022. That day, the court deferred the hearing to 6 December. In January 2023, the Delhi High Court transferred all these cases to the Supreme Court of India.

=== Dadra and Nagar Haveli and Daman and Diu ===
The Goa Civil Code, which applies to the union territory of Dadra and Nagar Haveli and Daman and Diu, former entities of Portuguese India, defines marriage as a "perpetual contract made between two persons of different sex with the purpose of legitimately constituting a family". Marriages are solemnised before officials of the Civil Registration Services according to the conditions established by law. Article 1058, which lists forbidden marriages such as marriages to relatives or to individuals under the marriageable age, does not explicitly ban marriages between people of the same sex.

=== Goa ===
Goa is unique among the states of India in being the only one to have a unified marriage law. Every citizen is bound to the same law regardless of their religion. However, article 1056 of the Goa Civil Code, largely based on Portuguese civil law, defines marriage as a "perpetual contract made between two persons of different sex with the purpose of legitimately constituting a family". Marriages are solemnised before officials of the Civil Registration Services according to the conditions established by law. Article 1058, which lists forbidden marriages such as marriages to relatives or to individuals under the marriageable age, does not explicitly ban marriages between people of the same sex.

Reported in the media as "India's first gay marriage", designer Wendell Rodricks and his French partner, Jerome Marrel, entered into a civil solidarity pact (PACS), a French civil union scheme, in 2002. Rodricks later reported that the evening of the signing of the PACS 8 "scruffy-looking men" came to the couple's house in Colvale. Although he anticipated trouble, the men instead said "Landlord, you are getting married and not buying us a round of drinks?" Scroll.in reported this history in 2022 as an "early sign" on how Goans would "overcome prejudice to open [their] arms to the queer community".

In 2006, a local LGBT advocacy group stated that in the past two years they had conducted 25 same-sex marriages, though the marriages lack legal recognition under the SMA or the Hindu Marriage Act (Konkani: हिंदू लग्न कायदो, १९५५, Hindū Lagna Kāydo, 1955). "Fearing social stigma and discrimination, we had to conduct all these marriages in a clandestine manner.", said a spokesman for the group. There have also been cases of marriages between cisgender men and transgender women. In 2022, a lesbian couple, Dr. Paromita Mukherjee and Dr. Surabhi Mitra, originally from Nagpur, Maharashtra, had a "big, fat, sea-side destination wedding" in Goa. The couple went public with the news of their wedding. Mukherjee said, "We are over the moon with the love we are garnering. Somewhere we knew that the society and its aware people will celebrate our love with us."

=== Gujarat ===
In March 2006, Governor Nawal Kishore Sharma signed the Gujarat Registration of Marriages Act, 2006 into law. The Act provides for the registration of all marriages solemnized in Gujarat irrespective of the religion, caste or creed of the parties. It does not explicitly ban same-sex marriages, and defines marriage simply as including remarriage. However, the Act generally refers to married spouses as "bride" and "bridegroom". Civil unions (Gujarati: નાગટયક વાંઘ, nāgaṭayaka vāṅgha; Sindhi: سِوِل يونين, sivil eonen) are also not recognised in Gujarat. A famous Gujarati resident to have entered into a same-sex marriage is Prince Manvendra Singh Gohil, probable heir of the honorary Maharaja of Rajpipla, who married his American partner Cecil "DeAndre" Richardson (né Hilton) in Seattle in July 2013.

In June 2020, a lesbian couple from the Mahisagar district filed a petition with the Gujarat High Court seeking police protection from their families and recognition of their right to cohabitation. The couple had entered into a "friendship agreement" (મૈત્રી કરાર, maitri karar, pronounced [ˈməjtɾi ˈkəɾɑɾ]) as a way to legitimise their relationship; "like in case of a marital union, it had details on property ownership, inheritance and maintenance, in case of separation." A maitri karar is a written document, often registered and notarized, which contains the terms and conditions on which a couple agrees to enter into cohabitation. The High Court granted their petition on 23 July 2020 and ordered the Mahisagar police to give protection to the couple. Maya Sharma, an activist with the Vikalp Women's Group, said "such contracts in court cases [are used] in which one of the partners' parents were forcing marriage upon them. It has helped us get judgements in our favour." The first maitri karar between a same-sex couple occurred in 1987 in the Chhota Udaipur district.

In the village of Angaar in the Kutch district, the local Kutchi culture celebrates ritualistic transgender marriages every year during the festival of Holi, a custom that has been followed for over 150 years.

=== Haryana ===
In April 2008, Governor Akhlaqur Rahman Kidwai signed the Haryana Compulsory Registration of Marriages Act, 2008 into law. The Act provides for the registration of all marriages solemnized in Haryana irrespective of the religion, caste or creed of the parties. It does not explicitly ban same-sex marriages, and defines marriage simply as including remarriage. However, the Act generally refers to married spouses as "bride" and "bridegroom".

A single case of legal recognition of a same-sex marriage was granted by the Punjab and Haryana High Court on 22 July 2011. The couple held a marriage ceremony in Gurgaon after signing an affidavit asserting that they met all of the requirements of a legal marriage. It is understood that the families of both spouses disapproved of the union, and the couple sought police protection following death threats from family members and local villagers. Previously, three same-sex couples had married at the Mata Mansa Devi Mandir in the Panchkula district in July 2009, though the marriages lack legal recognition. A lesbian couple had also married in a temple in Faridabad in 1993.

In October 2019, the Punjab and Haryana High Court dismissed a case, Monu Rajput v. State of Haryana, filed by a transgender man whose partner was being wrongfully detained by family members in Hansi. The court ruled that the partner could stay with her family, but gave the petitioner the right to visit from time to time. A little under two months after the dismissal of this writ petition, the couple ran away together and got a protection order from the Delhi High Court. In July 2020, the Punjab and Haryana High Court ruled in Manjinder Kaur and Another vs State of Punjab and Others that same-sex couples are entitled to live-in relationships and protection of their lives and liberty. The court did not comment on the legality of the relationship of the petitioners, a lesbian couple living in Ludhiana, Punjab, but ruled that the couple was entitled to protection of their lives and liberty as provided by Article 21 of the Constitution. In Pooja and Another vs. State of Punjab and Others, the High Court ruled in August 2023 that "Article 21 of the Constitution on protection of life and personal liberty [does] not cease to apply when people of the same gender decide to live together.", ordering police to protect a lesbian couple from "potential threats to their lives".

=== Himachal Pradesh ===
In 1997, the Himachal Pradesh Legislative Assembly passed the Himachal Pradesh Registration of Marriages Act, 1997, requiring the registration of all marriages performed in Himachal Pradesh. The Act does not explicitly forbid same-sex marriages and defines marriage simply as including remarriage.

On 22 June 2016, the Himachal Pradesh High Court recognised a guru-chela, or guru-shishya (गुरु-शिष्य, Sanskrit: [ˈɡuɾu ˈɕiʂjɐ]; Hindi: [ɡʊˈɾu: ˈʃɪʂjə]), relationship between two hijra (referred to as "eunuchs" in court documents) for the purpose of allowing the guru to claim the property of their late chela. Within the guru-chela system, the guru is considered the legal heir to the chela's property. In Sweety (Eunuch) v General Public, the High Court recognised this relationship and ruled that succession should be governed according to the guru-chela custom rather than under the Hindu Succession Act, 1956. In April 2022, two young men, who had married in a traditional ceremony in Delhi, asked for police protection from family members in Una.

=== Jammu and Kashmir ===
Marriage registration laws provide for the registration of all Muslim, Hindu and Sikh marriages performed in Jammu and Kashmir, as well as those performed under the SMA. These laws do not explicitly ban same-sex marriages, but the marriage certificate forms generally require the names of the "bride" and "bridegroom".

In 2007, a Sikh lesbian couple, Baljit Kaur and Rajwinder Kaur, eloped from Batala, Punjab, and married on 3 June at the Vaishno Devi Temple in Katra where an army officer agreed to marry them. They caused public controversy when they announced their marriage to the media later in the month. Rajwinder's family later tracked the couple and lodged a complaint against Baljit, claiming that she had "enticed their daughter". In court, Rajwinder testified against Baljit claiming that she had been "coerced into their lesbian relationship". Baljit argued that Rajwinder's family had forced her to testify against their relationship. In the Kashmir Valley, transgender women, also known as hijra, (Note: Kashmiri: لاںژھ, lãtsh, pronounced [lãːtsʰ]; Dogri: किन्नर, kinnar; Hindi: हिजड़ा, hijra; Urdu: ہِجڑا, hijra) have long been accepted as matchmakers and as performers at wedding ceremonies.

=== Jharkhand ===
All marriages performed in Jharkhand must be registered with the Jharkhand Compulsory Registration of Marriage Act, 2017. The Act does not explicitly forbid same-sex marriages. The largest party in the Jharkhand Legislative Assembly, the Jharkhand Mukti Morcha, has declined to take an official position on the legalisation of same-sex marriage.

Although the marriage lacks legal recognition, two women were married in a Hindu temple in Kodarma in December 2020. It is understood that the family of both spouses were opposed to the union. Several same-sex marriage ceremonies have also taken place among the Ho people. "Tribal society has no hassles accepting gay marriages. It has been happening amongst them since decades.", according to a 2009 report from the Hindustan Times. There is also a hijra community among the Ho people, known as kā pē'jani' (𑣌𑣁𑣁 𑣘𑣈𑣈𑣄𑣎𑣁𑣐𑣓𑣄, pronounced [ka: ˈpeːʔjaniʔ]), as well as among the Santal people, known as cākrā (ᱪᱟᱠᱨᱟ), and the Kurukh people, known as cakṛā (चकृा, pronounced [tʃaˈkɽaː]).

=== Karnataka ===
The Government of Karnataka published the Karnataka Marriage (Registration and Miscellaneous Provisions) Rules, 2006 in the Karnataka Gazette on 18 April 2006. The Rules provide for the registration of all marriages solemnized in Karnataka irrespective of the religion of the parties. The marriage certificate form requires the names of the "bride" and the "bridegroom". The Karnataka Marriages (Registration and Miscellaneous Provisions) Act, 1976 does not explicitly ban same-sex marriages, and defines marriage simply as including remarriage.

Some same-sex couples have married in traditional marriage ceremonies, though the marriages have no legal status in Karnataka. Nived Antony Chullickal and Abdul Rahim, originally from Kerala, were married in Bangalore in December 2019. "I really just wanted to get married to my boyfriend and shared pre-wedding photoshoot, firstly, as a message to everyone that it is better to be late than never and second, it is so good to come out and marry your partner. Our wedding was like any other wedding. I also wanted it to be an inspiration for people, so that they too can do the same, and now so many people have called me and I really feel good that I have been an inspiration for all.", Chullickal told The News Minute.

In 2020, members of the Kodava community called for the "ostracisation" of Dr. Sharath Ponnappa, a Kodava, because he chose to wear traditional Kodava attire, the kupya-chele, (Note: The kupya-chele (ಕುಪ್ಯ-ಚೇಲೆ in Kodava) consists of the kupya, a wraparound robe, and the chele, a gold-embroidered silk sash worn around the waist. The kupya-chele is worn by men on ceremonial occasions.) at his marriage to Sundeep Dosanj, a Punjabi American, in the United States on 26 September 2020. K. S. Devaiah, the president of the Kodava Samaja in Madikeri, a community group representing Kodava interests, noted that while there had been several instances of inter-caste marriages, this was the first same-sex marriage in the community. "This wedding, where the couple wore traditional Kodava attire, is an insult to the entire community. Hence, after a meeting the members of the Kodava Samaja, we have recommended ostracisation of Sharath Ponnappa from the community. [...] Gay marriage is one thing and wearing sacred Kodava attire to solemnise a gay marriage is another thing. We are against the latter.", said Devaiah. Ponnappa, a California doctor, responded to the controversy, saying, "We knew there would be dissenters, but we have literally been fighting for acceptance since the day we were born, fighting to survive and be treated the same as our peers. However, we proudly choose to live our truth, celebrate our same-sex marriage and encourage the dissenters to open their minds and engage in positive dialogue to understand that all humans are created equally and deserve respect and love." Kodava actor Gulshan Devaiah weighed in, stating, "I look at the picture and they look beautiful and all that matters to me is the coming together of two people who love each other. I see the fact that they decided to wear the Kodava attire as a mark of respect and celebration of the Kodava traditions."

The Halakki Vokkaliga, an indigenous people living in the Uttara Kannada district, have been celebrating traditional lesbian marriages for "so long that none living in the community now knows when and how it began". One such wedding, known in Kannada as daḍḍuve maduve (ದಡ್ಡುವೆ ಮದುವೆ, pronounced [ˈd̪ɐɖːʊʋe ˈmɐd̪ʊʋe]), is performed every year to honour Indra and pray that "the rain shouldn't be more or less than required". After the procession and rituals, the newly-weds, both of whom are dressed in saris, are blessed and given gifts just as at any other wedding. A recent daḍḍuve maduve in 2022 took place in a Hindu temple honouring Ganesha, who holds importance for the Halakki Vokkaliga.

=== Kerala ===
In 2008, the Government of Kerala, by order of Governor R. L. Bhatia, published the Kerala Registration of Marriages (Common) Rules, 2008 in the Kerala Gazette on 29 February 2008. The Rules provide for the registration of all marriages in Kerala "solemnized […] after the commencement of these Rules […] irrespective of [the] religion of the parties". The marriage certificate form requires the name, nationality, age, date of birth, address, and the previous marital status of the "husband" and the "wife". Civil partnerships (Malayalam: ഗാര്ഹിക പങ്കാളിത്തം, gārhika paṅkāḷittaṁ, pronounced [ˈgaːɾhigə paŋˈgaːɭit̪ːam]) are also not recognised in Kerala. In a survey published by the Azim Premji Foundation and Lokniti-CSDS in 2019, 58% of participants from the state opposed same-sex relationships; the fourth highest among the twelve states surveyed. The 2021 Mathrubhumi Youth Manifesto Survey conducted on people aged between 15 and 35 showed that 74.3% of respondents supported legalising same-sex marriage, while 25.7% were opposed.

In January 2020, Sonu Soman, an IP professional, and Nikesh Pushkaran, a businessman, filed a writ petition in the Kerala High Court, arguing that preventing them from marrying under the SMA violated the principle of equality, non-arbitrariness, non-discrimination, individual dignity and personal autonomy of Articles 14, 15(1), 19(1)(a) and 21 of the Constitution of India. The couple, from the Ernakulam district, had sought to marry at the Guruvayur Temple, but authorities refused to solemnize the marriage and issue a certificate; they married in a secret ceremony in a car parking area of the temple in July 2018. They cited the Supreme Court's ruling in Navtej Singh Johar v. Union of India, which decriminalized homosexuality in India in 2018 and recognized a person's right to be treated with dignity regardless of sexual orientation, whilst arguing that exclusion from the institution of marriage denies them basic rights and privileges such as maintenance, inheritance, pension, joint bank accounts, etc: "The institution of marriage affords certain rights and privileges to the persons in matrimony in the society and due to the aforesaid exclusion, the homosexual couples like the petitioners are denied an opportunity to enjoy similar rights and privileges. Being married carries along with it the right to maintenance, right of inheritance, a right to own joint bank accounts, lockers; nominate each other as a nominee in insurance, pension, gratuity papers etc. All these are unavailable to the Petitioners due to their exclusion from the institution of marriage, making the said exclusion more discriminatory." The couple filed the writ on 24 January with Justice Anu Sivaraman. As of October 2022, the Kerala Government had not yet filed a response to the writ petition. Soman and Pushkaran wrote to Chief Minister Pinarayi Vijayan, but likewise did not receive a response. In November 2022, the Deputy Solicitor General announced that the government was planning on transferring the writ petition to the Supreme Court of India.

In 2018, the Kerala High Court ruled in Sreeja S v. Commissioner of Police that a lesbian couple, Sreeja and Aruna, did not violate the law by living together in a same-sex relationship. The couple had moved in together, but Aruna's parents filed a missing person complaint with the police, and later attempted to send her to a mental hospital in Thiruvananthapuram. During the court proceedings, Aruna clarified that she was living with Sreeja of her own free will. The court held that their live-in relationship did not violate the law, and ordered that the couple be allowed to freely reside together. In May 2022, the Kerala High Court gave a Muslim lesbian couple, Fathima Noora and Adhila Nasarin, the right to live together. The couple had been forcibly separated by their families, with Noora allegedly being forced into conversion therapy. Nasarin filed a habeas corpus plea, Adhila Nasarin v. Commissioner of Police, stating, "Noora's mother came and showed me a petition saying that I kidnapped her and she will take her back. They are very cruel, they may try to kill her and there were several threats from Noora's family. They even threatened to kill me and my father. Noora was taken away from me by force." In a short proceeding before Justices K. Vinod Chandran and C. Jayachandran, the court issued a judgement in favour of the couple on 31 May. The couple were married in a traditional ceremony in October 2022. In 2022, a woman from Kaloor filed a habeas corpus plea, Devu G. Nair v. State of Kerala, alleging that her same-sex partner had been illegally detained by her parents. The couple had been together for a year and planned on getting married. On 2 February 2023, the High Court denied the plea and directed the detained partner to attend psychiatric counselling. On 6 February, the plaintiff filed for review with the Indian Supreme Court. In her petition, she stated that the counselling recommended by the High Court "is obviously counselling to change her sexual orientation.", and urged her partner's release.

In February 2023, the state government said it would introduce legislation to the Kerala Legislative Assembly amending the Kerala Registration of Marriages (Common) Rules, 2008 to allow transgender people to marry. The first marriage ceremony for a transgender couple took place in Thiruvananthapuram in May 2018. As both partners were transgender, authorities allowed it to be solemnised under the SMA as an opposite-sex marriage.

=== Ladakh ===
The Registration of Marriages (Ladakh) Regulations, 2022, which provide for the compulsory registrations of all marriages performed in Ladakh, define marriage as "all marriages solemnised or contracted between a male and a female, irrespective of the religion or caste of either party to the marriage, and also includes marriages performed as per law, custom, practice or any tradition of either party to the marriage and includes a remarriage."

The culture of Ladakh has been significantly influenced by Tibetan customs. The Ladakhis historically practiced fraternal polyandry until the early 1940s. However, the practice remained in existence until the 1990s especially in isolated, rural areas. While there are no records of same-sex marriages as understood from a Western perspective being performed in Ladakhi culture, there is evidence for identities and behaviours that may be placed on the LGBT spectrum. Mgron po (མགྲོན་པོ, literally meaning "guest") are passive homosexual partners, often in a close relationship with a monk. This relationship was socially accepted and understood to include sexual relations–but not penetration–and the mgron po would "often receive substantial benefit to his career and status through this association".

=== Lakshadweep ===
The union territory of Lakshadweep falls within the jurisdiction of the Kerala High Court. The cases of Sreeja S, Adhila Nasarin, and Devu G. Nair concerning cohabitation and live-in relationships between same-sex partners have precedent in Lakshadweep.

=== Madhya Pradesh ===
The Government of Madhya Pradesh published the Madhya Pradesh Compulsory Registration of Marriages Rules, 2008 in the Madhya Pradesh Gazette in November 2008. The Rules provide for the registration of all marriages solemnized in Madhya Pradesh irrespective of the religion of the parties. They define marriage as "all marriages solemnized, performed or contracted between a male and female, irrespective of the religion or caste of either party to the marriage and includes marriages performed as per law, custom, practice or any tradition of either party to the marriage and also includes a re-marriage as including remarriage."

In 1987, two policewomen, Lila Namdeo and Urmila Srivastava, were married in a traditional Hindu ceremony in Sagar by a Brahmin priest. Narendra Virmani, the Inspector General of Police, discharged them after learning about the marriage. The couple was kept in isolation and not provided food for 48 hours. They were subjected to a "medical examination", and later left at the railway station in the middle of the night and warned against returning to the barracks. The event received wide coverage in the press at the time. In 2023, the state government urged the Supreme Court "not to rush" into legalising same-sex marriage in Supriyo, arguing that the Parliament should decide the issue, "Whole social fabric will break apart if things are thrust upon the society by the court… we have to take things slowly in this area and not with speed." A custom called nātā prathā (नाता प्रथा, Hindi: [ˈnaːt̪a: pɾəˈt̪ʰaː]) is practiced among lower-caste communities in parts of Madhya Pradesh and Rajasthan, allowing a couple to live together and perform "all [the] obligations of [a married couple] without a formal wedding ceremony". A nātā prathā is formalized through a written agreement and the payment of a bride price, and they are known cases of same-sex couples entering into the arrangement.

=== Maharashtra ===
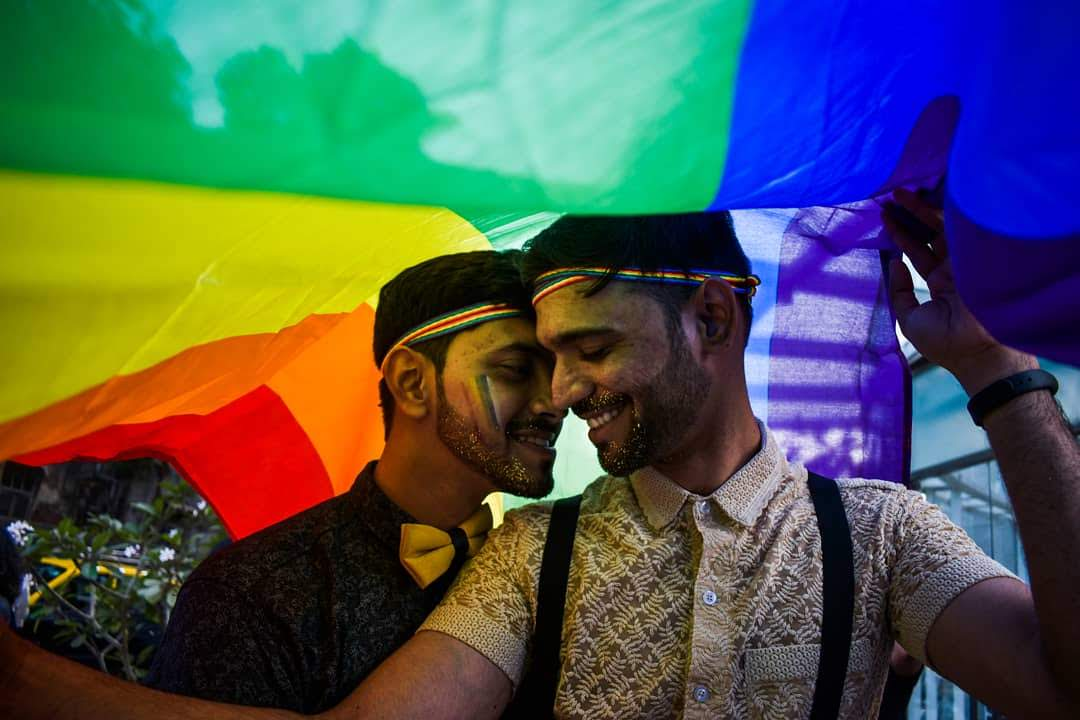
A same-sex couple at Queer Azaadi Mumbai in 2019

In April 1999, Governor P. C. Alexander signed the Maharashtra Regulation of Marriage Bureaus and Registration of Marriages Act, 1998 into law. The Act provides for the registration of all marriages solemnized in Maharashtra irrespective of the religion, caste or creed of the parties. It does not explicitly ban same-sex marriages, and defines marriage simply as including remarriage. However, the Act generally refers to married spouses as "husband and wife"; the Act defines the "parties" to a marriage as "the husband and wife whose marriage has been solemnized". Civil partnerships (Marathi: नागरी संघ, nāgrī saṅgha, pronounced [ˈnaːɡəɾi: ˈsəŋɡʱə]) are also not recognised in Maharashtra.

In December 2017, a same-sex couple, 43-year-old IIT Bombay engineer Hrishi Sathawane and his 35-year-old partner of Vietnamese origin known only as Vinh, were married in a traditional Hindu ceremony in Yavatmal. The ceremony, which was attended by close friends and family members, involved an exchange of rings and garlands in accordance with Hindu custom. In February 2019, two men, Vinodh Philip and Vincent Illaire, held a traditional marriage ceremony in Mumbai with the exchange of garlands and also the wearing of a mangala sutra and toe rings as symbols of marriage.

In December 2023, Archbishop of Bombay Oswald Gracias responded to Fiducia supplicans, a declaration allowing Catholic priests to bless same-sex couples, by calling it "an affirmation of our spirituality and a gift". Gracias said, "Our Indian mentality is so inclusive, understanding people of other religions and other faiths. All are searching for God, all are searching for the truth, all are searching for spirituality."

=== Manipur ===
The Manipur Compulsory Registration of Marriages Act, 2008 officially took effect in October 2013. The Act provides for the registration of all marriages solemnized in Manipur irrespective of the religion or caste of the parties. It defines marriage as "all the marriages contracted or solemnized by persons belonging to any caste, religion or creed and the marriages solemnized or contracted as per any custom, practices or traditions and also includes 're-marriages'". The Act does not explicitly ban same-sex marriage, but states that the parties to the marriage "mean the husband and wife whose marriage has been solemnized".

A same-sex marriage ceremony occurred in Imphal in March 2010. The marriage lacks legal recognition and it is understood that the parents of the couple were opposed to the union. In pre-colonial Meitei society, there existed a third gender community known as nupi maanbi (Manipuri: নুপি মানবি, ꯅꯨꯄꯤ ꯃꯥꯟꯕꯤ, pronounced [nùpì mánbì]), who "[held] a high status, power and privilege in the social and cultural life of Meitei society", acting as religious counsellors and guards for the Meitei kings at the Kangla fort.

=== Meghalaya ===
In September 2012, Governor Ranjit Shekhar Mooshahary signed the Meghalaya Compulsory Registration of Marriage Act, 2012, also commonly known as the Marriage Act (Khasi: Ki Aiñ Shongkha Shongman; Garo: Bia Ka•ani Niam), into law. The Act provides for the registration of all marriages solemnized in Meghalaya irrespective of the religion of the parties. It does not explicitly prohibit same-sex marriages, and defines marriage as "all marriages contracted by persons belonging to any caste, tribe or religion, and the marriages contracted as per any customs, practices or traditions, and also includes re-marriages and live in relationship." However, the Act generally refers to married spouses as "bride" and "bridegroom".

In 2018, a spokesperson for the Roman Catholic Archdiocese of Shillong expressed the diocese's opposition to same-sex marriage. In December 2023, Archbishop Victor Lyngdoh announced that clergy could bless same-sex couples in accordance with Fiducia supplicans and drew on Pope Francis' urging of the faithful to "avoid being 'judges who only deny, reject, and exclude'".

=== Mizoram ===
The Mizo Marriage, Divorce and Inheritance of Property Act, 2014 (Mizo: Inneih, Inthen leh Rokhawm Dan, 2014) enacted by the Mizoram Legislative Assembly, regulates marriage, divorce and inheritance rules for the Mizo people, allowing marriages performed under Mizo customs to be legally recognised in Mizoram. The Act defines marriage as "a union of a man and a woman who are both major as husband and wife". In a survey published by the Azim Premji Foundation and Lokniti-CSDS in 2019, 87% of participants from the state opposed same-sex relationships; the highest among the twelve states surveyed.

In pre-colonial Mizo society, there seems to have been a third gender community, known as tuai, who performed roles opposite to their biological genders. The tuai dressed as women, wearing the puan, and performed work which was traditionally regarded as belonging to the feminine sphere. It is quite rare, however, to find mentions of tuai in Mizo oral literature and written history. According to some Mizo academics, Tuaisala, the younger brother of Liandova, a Mizo hero, was a tuai and performed a tuai khaw fang, a practice among tuai to travel around villages in the Lushai Hills. It is said, however, that tuai were buried facing the ground, which was considered a sign of disrespect. In the early 20th century, British colonial officers ordered every tuai to begin dressing up as men and perform forced labour like Mizo men.

=== Nagaland ===
Same-sex marriage remains a controversial topic in Nagaland. In a survey published by the Azim Premji Foundation and Lokniti-CSDS in 2019, 63% of participants from the state opposed same-sex relationships; the second highest among the twelve states surveyed. Some LGBT people are reportedly forced into heterosexual marriages. In May 2023, as the Indian Supreme Court was considering a case to legalise same-sex marriage, the leader of the Naga People's Front, Küzholuzo Nienü, said, "I, on my behalf and on behalf of the Naga People's Front, am of the view that the honourable Supreme Court should not allow legalized-sex marriages. The Government of India has rightly opposed same-sex marriages. Naga customary law nor any of the known faiths including Christianity, allow for marriages among same sexes, whether men or women [sic]."

=== Odisha ===
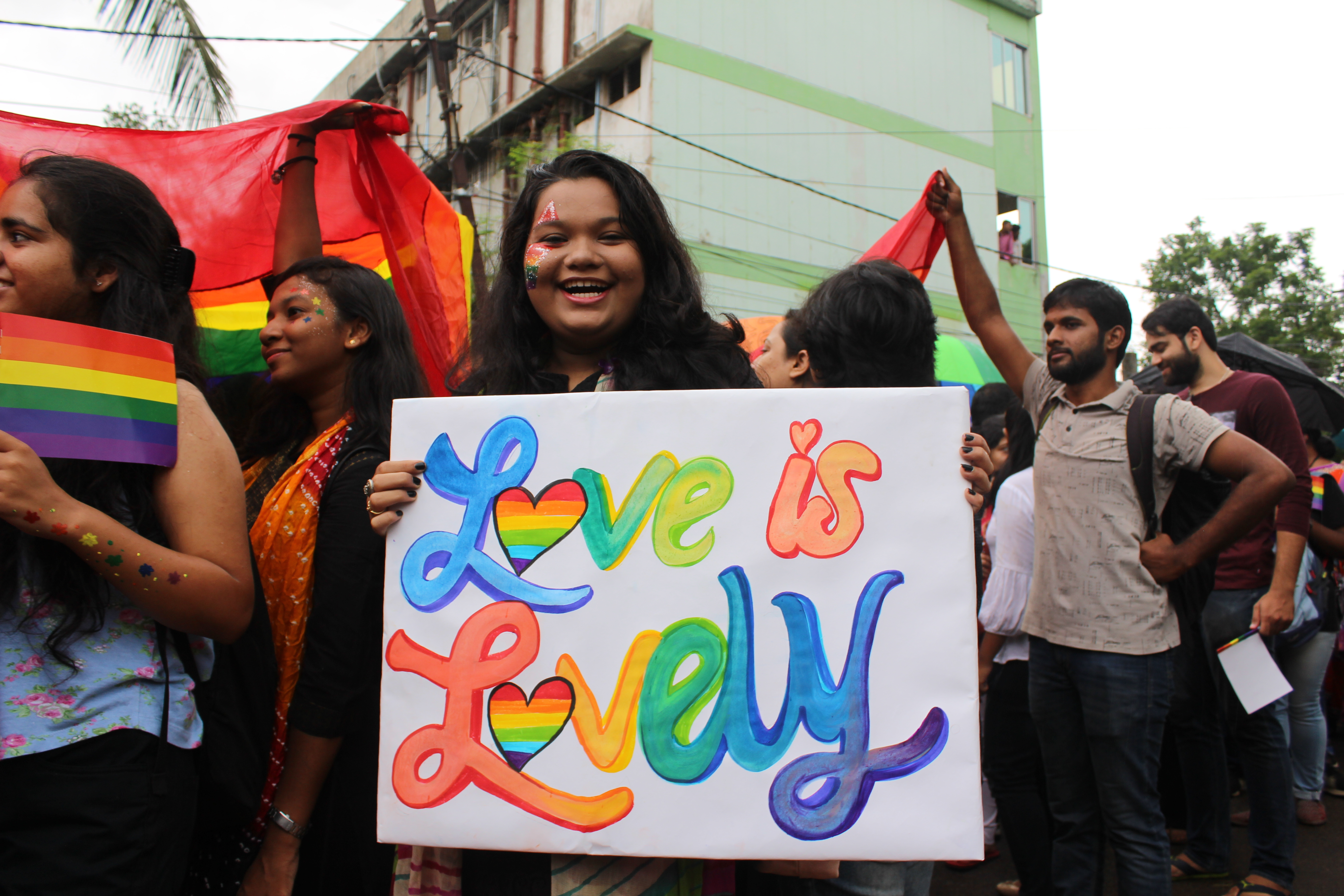
Supporters of same-sex marriage at a pride parade in Bhubaneswar in 2019

In November 2006, two Khond women, Bateka Palang and Maleka Nilsa, were married "in a traditional ceremony, in the presence of family" in a rural town in the Koraput district, Odisha. Following the traditional custom of bride price, the gāṭi muḍa, (Note: The gāṭi muḍa (ଗାଟି ମୁଡ in Kui) is traditionally paid to the parents of the bride by the groom.) the family of Bateka gave a cow and wine to the family of Maleka. Bateka's mother was quoted as saying, "We resisted their marriage because it was against our tradition. But they were in no mood to listen and eloped. Finally, we were compelled to get them married according to our tradition. I have accepted Maleka as my daughter-in-law." Two women were married in a temple in Talcher in July 2018 "causing outrage among the villagers and ostracisation of their own families". A lesbian couple, Sabitri Parida and Monalisa Nayak, were married in a traditional Hindu ceremony in Kendrapara in January 2019. The parents of the brides were not supportive of their relationship, and Noyak's father issued a statement alleging that "his daughter is innocent and is under a spell of black magic", urging police to separate the couple. The couple left to Bhubaneswar to avoid family harassment.

In August 2020, the Orissa High Court ruled in Chinmayee Jena v. State of Odisha that same-sex live-in relationships are recognised under the constitutional right to life and equality. The court heard a habeas corpus plea filed by Sonu Krishna Jena, a transgender man, whose partner had been kidnapped by her family and forced into a marriage with another man. It ordered the partner's release, recognising the right to cohabit with a partner of a person's choice regardless of gender. The court also held that women in live-in relationships are protected under a 2005 domestic violence law similarly to different-sex cohabiting couples. It is unknown what legal rights and benefits live-in relationship provide to same-sex couples. Unlike registered partnerships (Odia: ନାଗରିକ ସହଭାଗୀତା, nagôrikô sôhôbhagita, pronounced [naɡɔˈɾikɔ sɔhɔbʱaˈɡiːt̪a]), live-in relatationships lack a robust, legally protected status.

=== Puducherry ===
Puducherry falls within the jurisdiction of the Madras High Court, based in Tamil Nadu. On 22 April 2019, the High Court ruled in Arunkumar v. The Inspector General of Registration that transgender women may marry under the Hindu Marriage Act, 1955, (Note: In Puducherry's official languages: Tamil: இந்து திருமணச் சட்டம், 1955, Intu Tirumaṇaṅkaḷ Caṭṭam, 1955; Telugu: హిందూ వివాహ చట్టం, 1955, Hindū Vivāha Caṭṭaṁ, 1955; Malayalam: ഹിന്ദു വിവാഹ നിയമം, 1955, Hindu Vivāha Niyamaṁ, 1955; French: Loi de 1955 sur le mariage hindou) a ruling that has precedent in Puducherry as well. Hindu marriages are registered with the Pondicherry Hindu Marriage Registration Rules, 1969.

=== Punjab ===
On 4 January 2013, Governor Shivraj Patil assented the Punjab Compulsory Registration of Marriages Act, 2012. The Act defines marriage as "includ[ing] a marriage, solemnized in the State of Punjab under any of the following Act, customs or laws, namely: the Indian Christian Marriage Act, 1872 (15 of 1872); the Anand Marriage Act, 1909 (7 of 1909); the Muslim Personal Law (Shariat) Application Act, 1937 (26 of 1937); the Hindu Marriage Act, 1955 (25 of 1955); or any other custom or personal law relating to marriages." It does not explicitly ban same-sex marriages.

Reported in the media as Punjab's "first gay marriage", a lesbian couple were married as per traditional Hindu customs on 22 April 2017 in Jalandhar, alongside family and friends. On 18 September 2023, a transgender man and a cisgender woman were married at a gurdwara in Bathinda "in all the traditional rituals and got married in the presence of the Guru Granth Sahib". The marriage proved controversial, with the Jathedar of the Akal Takht condemning the wedding as "a severe moral and religious violation" which is "unnatural and contrary to Sikh ethics". Hardev Singh, the priest who performed the ceremony, was suspended.

In July 2020, the Punjab and Haryana High Court ruled in Manjinder Kaur and Another vs State of Punjab and Others that same-sex couples are entitled to live-in relationships (Punjabi: ਲਿਵ ਇਨ ਰਿਲੇਸ਼ਨਸ਼ਿਪ, liv ina rileśnaśip) and protection of their lives and liberty. The court did not comment on the legality of the relationship of the petitioners, a lesbian couple living in Ludhiana, but ruled that the couple was entitled to protection of their lives and liberty as provided by Article 21 of the Constitution. In Pooja and Another vs. State of Punjab and Others, the High Court ruled in August 2023 that "Article 21 of the Constitution on protection of life and personal liberty [does] not cease to apply when people of the same gender decide to live together.", ordering police to protect a lesbian couple from "potential threats to their lives". The court had ruled similarly in 2019 for a male couple who were "receiving threats to their lives and liberty at the hands of [their] family".

=== Rajasthan ===
On 10 September 2009, Governor Shilendra Kumar Singh signed the Rajasthan Compulsory Registration of Marriages Act, 2009 into law. The Act provides for the registration of all marriages solemnized in Rajasthan irrespective of the religion of the parties. It does not explicitly prohibit same-sex marriages, and defines marriage simply as including remarriage.

In December 2022, a same-sex couple, Kahran Singh and Gourav Tarafdar, were married in a traditional Hindu wedding ceremony in Jaisalmer alongside family and friends. The union is not legally recognised in Rajasthan, and it is understood that some family members of the couple were opposed to the marriage. Previously, a lesbian couple, Ayesha Nageshwaran and Katja Hahnloser-Nageshwaran, had held a wedding ceremony in Jaisalmer in November 2019. In May 2023, the state government, led by the Indian National Congress (INC), announced its opposition to same-sex marriage, writing in a statement that same-sex marriage would "create imbalance in the social fabric, leading to widespread consequences for the social and family systems." Subsequently, film director Onir accused the INC of "betraying the LGBT community". Responding to the controversy, MP Shashi Tharoor said the party had yet to announce an official position on same-sex marriage. A custom called nātā prathā (नाता प्रथा, Hindi: [ˈnaːta: pɾəˈtʰaː]) is practiced among lower-caste communities in Rajasthan, allowing a couple to live together and perform "all [the] obligations of [a married couple] without a formal wedding ceremony". A nātā prathā is formalized through a written agreement and the payment of a bride price, and they are known cases of same-sex couples entering into the arrangement.

=== Sikkim ===
In August 2007, the Government of Sikkim published "Notification No. 10/R", also commonly known as the Marriage Rules, (Note: Nepali: विवाह ऐन, Vivāha Aina, pronounced [biba: ʌi̯nʌ]; Sikkimese: གཉེན་གྱི་ཁིམས, gnyen gyi khrims; Lepcha: ᰓᰥᰧᰠᰦ ᰝ᰷ᰥᰧᰮᰶ, Brisá Thrím) ordering the compulsory registration of all marriages solemnised in Sikkim. Previously, only the ICMA and the HMA were applicable to Sikkim. In 2019, President Ram Nath Kovind approved by public notification the extension of the SMA to Sikkim as well. In May 2023, in response to the ongoing deliberations in the Supreme Court in the Supriyo case, the state government issued a statement that it needed "more time" to take a stand on the issue.

=== Tamil Nadu ===
In 2009, the Tamil Nadu Legislative Assembly passed the Tamil Nadu Registration of Marriages Act, 2009, which was signed into law by Governor Surjit Singh Barnala in August 2009. The Act provides for the registration of all marriages in Tamil Nadu "performed on and from the date of commencement of this Act". It defines marriage as "all marriages performed by persons belonging to any caste or religion under any law for the time being in force, or as per any custom or usage in any form or manner and also includes remarriage". According to a 2019 report titled "Politics and Society Between Elections 2019", published by the Azim Premji Foundation and Lokniti-CSDS, Tamil Nadu ranked third in the nation in terms of acceptance of same-sex unions, after Delhi and Uttar Pradesh. On 17 November 2023, Justice N Anand Venkatesh recommended the state government to introduce a "deed of familial association", a scheme "[protect]ing [same-sex couples] from harassment and discrimination in society" and offering some limited legal benefits.

On 22 April 2019, the Madras High Court ruled in Arunkumar v. The Inspector General of Registration that transgender women may marry under the HMA. The court ordered the state government to register the marriage of a man and a transgender woman, Shri Arunkumar and Ms. Srija, which had been performed in October 2018 in Thoothukudi in accordance with Hindu custom. The couple were issued a marriage certificate following the court ruling in May 2019. Following their marriage ceremony in October, the Registrar of Marriages had refused to certify the marriage and issue a license, arguing that the couple could not marry under the HMA and that the dictionary definition of bride excluded transgender women. The court ruled that the refusal to register the marriage discriminated on the basis of gender identity in violation of the Supreme Court's ruling in National Legal Services Authority v. Union of India. The court also discussed the story of Aravan in its ruling.

A Tamil woman, Subiksha Subramani, married her Bangladeshi partner Tina Das in a traditional Tamil wedding ceremony in Chennai in September 2022. The marriage has no legal status in India, but Subramani said, "It was everything we dreamt of but never thought was possible. After years of soldering thorough and braving the taunts we are happy today that our loved ones are standing with us, cheering for us and performing every ritual according to our respective customs." The officiant who performed the ceremony said he had already performed several ceremonies for same-sex couples. A same-sex couple were married in a traditional Hindu ceremony near Salem in July 2022.

Every year, many Tamil transgender people meet in Koovagam to marry Lord Aravan, known locally as Koothandavar. The participants marry Koothandavar, thus reenacting an ancient story in the Mahabharata: "Aravan, the son of Arjuna and Nāga princess Ulupi, agrees to be sacrificed to goddess Kali so that the Pandavas can win the war against the Kauravas. His dying wish is that he is married. However, no one is willing to marry him since he will be sacrificed the next morning. So Krishna takes on female form as Mohini, weds Aravan – only to be widowed the morning after." Transgender people in Tamil Nadu are referred to as aravāṇi (அரவாணி, pronounced [ˈaɾaʋaːɳi]) in reference to the story. Other characters in the Mahabharata epic changed their gender. For instance, Shikhandi, the sibling of Draupadi, changed gender to male in order to go to war; Arjuna spent the last year of a 13-year-exile as a eunuch named Brihannala; and Krishna as Mohini had a son named Ayyappan with Shiva.

=== Telangana ===
The Andhra Pradesh Compulsory Registration of Marriages Act, 2002, which received the assent of Governor C. Rangarajan on 21 May 2002, was in force in the combined state of Telangana and Andhra Pradesh. On 2 June 2014, the Act was adapted to Telangana as the Telangana Compulsory Registration of Marriages Act, 2002. It defines marriage as "all marriages performed by persons belonging to any caste or religion and also the marriages performed as per any custom, practices or any traditions including the marriages performed in the tribal areas and the word 'marriage' also includes 'remarriage'". The Act generally refers to married spouses as "bride and bridegroom".

On 18 December 2021, two men, Supriyo Chakraborty and Abhay Dang, were married in a Hindu ceremony in Hyderabad, making "it the first gay wedding in the Telugu States". Their wedding was attended by family members and close friends, but the union is not legally recognised in Telangana. The couple later filed a lawsuit, Supriyo v. Union of India, seeking legal recognition for their marriage under the SMA. The Indian Supreme Court heard oral arguments in this case in April and May 2023. It issued a verdict on 17 October 2023, declining to recognise same-sex marriages under the SMA.

=== Tripura ===
In August 2004, Governor Dinesh Nandan Sahay signed the Tripura Recording of Marriage Act, 2003 into law. The Act provides for the registration of all marriages solemnized in Tripura irrespective of the religion or caste of the parties. It does not explicitly prohibit same-sex marriages, and defines marriage simply as including remarriage. However, the Act generally refers to married spouses as "husband and wife".

Same-sex marriage remains a controversial topic in Tripura, with many LGBT people forced by families into heterosexual marriages and some couples also resorting to a so-called "marriage by elopement" (Bengali: পালিয়ে বিয়ে, paliẏe biẏe, pronounced [ˈpali̯e ˈbi̯e]; Kokborok: kharlai kaijakmani) to avoid family harassment and violence. In May 2023, the local chapter of the Hindu-nationalist Vishwa Hindu Parishad organisation urged the Supreme Court to reject the case seeking to legalise same-sex marriage, claiming that "Hindu society and heterogenous marriage culture would be destroyed" if same-sex marriage were legalised.

=== Uttar Pradesh ===
All marriages performed in Uttar Pradesh must be registered with the Uttar Pradesh Marriage Registration Rules, 2017. The Rules provide for the registration of all marriages solemnized in the state irrespective of the religion or caste of the parties. According to a 2019 report titled "Politics and Society Between Elections 2019", published by the Azim Premji Foundation and Lokniti-CSDS, Uttar Pradesh ranked first in the nation in terms of acceptance of same-sex unions.

Some same-sex couples have married in traditional marriage ceremonies, though the marriages have no legal status in Uttar Pradesh. In 2004, two young Muslim men were married in Ghaziabad but were physically assaulted by family members when it was reported that they intended to continue living together. In 2018, a lesbian couple were married in Agra despite opposition from family members. In 2019, two women got married in Hamirpur, but the local registrar's office refused to register the union citing lack of relevant legal provisions. In June 2019, two women in Muzaffarnagar asked for police protection from their families in order to be allowed to marry. There is also a large hijra (हिजड़ा, Hindi: [ˈɦɪdʒɽaː]; ہِجڑا, Urdu: [ˈɦɪdʒɽaː]) community in Uttar Pradesh, and there are known instances of transgender marriages occurring in the state.

In Poonam Rani v. State of Uttar Pradesh, the Allahabad High Court ruled in January 2021 that same-sex couples in live-in relationships should be entitled to equal protection under the law as Indian citizens, safeguards against discrimination and unequal treatment, and freedom to choose a partner of one's choice. The court reiterated precedent it had set in its 2020 ruling in Sultana Mirza v. State of Uttar Pradesh. In April 2022, the Allahabad High Court dismissed a case brought by a Hindu lesbian couple in Prayagraj who wished to marry under the HMA. The court also dismissed a habeas corpus claim brought by the mother of one of the spouses who claimed that her daughter had been kidnapped by the partner. The state government intervened politically in the case to signal its opposition to same-sex marriages, "As per the Indian law and culture, a biological husband and wife have are essential for marriage, and only their marriage has been recognised. In their absence, homosexual marriage cannot be recognised as it lacks male and female and neither can they produce children. Marriage is considered important in Hindu law, under which both men and women live together and carry forward the human chain by producing children."

=== Uttarakhand ===
In 2010, the Government of Uttarakhand published the Uttarakhand Compulsory Registration of Marriage Rules, 2010. The Rules provide for the registration of all marriages solemnized in Uttarakhand irrespective of the religion of the parties. They do not explicitly prohibit same-sex marriages, and define marriage as "all the marriages contracted by person belonging to any caste, tribe or religion, and the marriages contracted as per any custom, practices or traditions, and also includes re-marriages". However, the marriage certificate form requires the names of the "bride" and the "bridegroom".

On 12 June 2020, the Uttarakhand High Court ruled in Madhu Bala v. State of Uttarakhand that live-in relationships (Hindi: लिव-इन रिलेशनशिप, liv-in rileśanśip, pronounced [ˈlɪʋɪn ɾɪˈleːʃənəʃɪp]) between same-sex couples are not unlawful; "It is a fundamental right which is guaranteed to a person under Article 21 of the Constitution of India, which is wide enough to protect an inherent right of self determination with regards to one's identity and freedom of choice with regards to the sexual orientation of choice of the partner". The court pointed out that the liberty of an adult person cannot be curtailed so long as they are capable to making a choice for themselves, and they are entitled to enjoy the freedoms that are permitted to them by law. In this case, the petitioner, Madhu Bala, filed the habeas corpus writ petition accusing family members of wrongfully detaining her partner. In oral arguments on 27 May 2020, the partner told the court that she wished to live with Bala. However, that statement was made in the absence of her family members. The court noted that the case could not be decided in their absence since the allegation of wrongful confinement had been made against them. In a second hearing in front of the court on 8 June 2020, with family members in attendance, the partner retracted her previous statement and said she would like to reside in her parents' home. The court subsequently dismissed the writ petition. Surabhi Shukla, law professor at the University of Sheffield, said in a statement, "The court severely waters down this right [live-in relationships] in application in this case. They do not implement the declaration made by one of the women in the relationship that she wants to continue to live with her partner because she makes this statement in the absence of her family. This raises the question: is this because of the deep-seated paternalism and homophobia of the legal system, or is it because the legal procedure requires the presence of her family members in this case." In December 2021, the High Court issued a decision in Rohit Sagar v. State of Uttarakhand, upholding the rights of adults to choose their life partners, even when confronted with objections from their families. The court instructed police in the Udham Singh Nagar district to ensure protection for both petitioners.

In June 2023, media reported that a government committee was considering the introduction of a uniform civil code in Uttarakhand which included recommendations concerning same-sex live-in relationships and "the rights of the LGBTQ community". However, a member of the committee was later quoted as saying that legal rights for same-sex couples would be "unlikely".

=== West Bengal ===
In August 2006, the Government of West Bengal published the West Bengal Hindu Marriage Registration Rules, 2010. The Rules provide for the registration of all Hindu marriages solemnised in West Bengal. They do not explicitly define marriage but generally refer to married spouses as "husband and wife" and define the "parties" to a marriage as "husband and wife". The government similarly published the West Bengal Special Marriage Rules, 2010, which requires the registration of all marriages performed under the SMA.

On 3 July 2022, a same-sex couple, Abhishek Ray and Chaitanya Sharma, got married in a traditional Hindu ceremony in Kolkata alongside family and friends. Abhishek said, "So, we were sceptical about it at first but then thought a wedding ceremony was not a criminal act. Section 377 allows gay couples to be together. In a social wedding, it is not just two people getting married, but it is about two families coming together. Gay marriages might not be legal, but doing this social event with loved ones is important to celebrate our love. Making this decision was not easy, but we made it happen. I guess this is the first gay wedding in Kolkata and I hope this is followed by several such marriages and it becomes as natural and normal as any other wedding." A couple, Shaswata Lahiri and Diyasha Bhattacharya, had previously gotten married in a Hindu temple in North Kolkata in 2007, and another same-sex couple, Sree and Suchandra Das Mukherjee, had married in Kolkata in December 2015.

== Court cases ==
=== Shakti Vahini v. Union of India ===
In March 2018, the Indian Supreme Court, in the case of Shakti Vahini v. Union of India, held that an adult has the fundamental right to marry a person of their choice. In this case, which centred on the practice of honour killings, most often performed by family members when a person chooses to marry outside of their caste or religious group, the court ruled that "the choice of an individual is an inextricable part of dignity, for dignity cannot be thought of where there is erosion of choice. True it is, the same is bound by the principle of constitutional limitation but in the absence of such limitation, none, we mean, no one shall be permitted to interfere in the fructification of the said choice. If the right to express one's own choice is obstructed, it would be extremely difficult to think of dignity in its sanctified completeness." At the time, LGBT activists felt that a joint reading of Shakti Vahini and Navtej Singh Johar, could yield the recognition of same-sex unions within the Special Marriage Act, 1954.

=== Supriyo v. Union of India ===
==== Oral arguments and reactions ====
On 25 November 2022, the Supreme Court of India agreed to hear a case, Supriyo v. Union of India, challenging the government's refusal to recognise same-sex marriages under the Special Marriage Act. The lead plaintiffs were Supriyo Chakraborty and Abhay Dang, a couple from Hyderabad. The filing of the lawsuit was opposed by some politicians. On 19 December 2022, Sushil Modi, a prominent lawmaker from the Bharatiya Janata Party (BJP), told Parliament that "India is [a] country of 1.4 billion people and two judges cannot just sit in a room and decide on such a socially significant subject. Instead, there should be a debate in Parliament as well as the society at large." On 6 January 2023, a three-judge bench of the Supreme Court, led by Chief Justice Dhananjaya Y. Chandrachud, ordered that all lawsuits challenging the inability of same-sex couples to marry in the Delhi and Kerala high courts be transferred to the Supreme Court, and set oral arguments for 13 March 2023. Citing the importance of this matter and invoking Article 145(3) of the Constitution, the Supreme Court referred the case on 13 March to a five-judge constitution bench, and set the first oral arguments for 18 April 2023.

On 14 March 2023, during a press conference of the Akhil Bharatiya Pratinidhi Sabha, Dattatreya Hosabale, general secretary of the far-right and Hindu-nationalist Rashtriya Swayamsevak Sangh organisation expressed opposition to the extension of marriage rights to same-sex couples, arguing that "marriage is an institution for the benefit of the family and society, not for physical and sexual enjoyment." On 24 March 2023, a group of 21 retired judges of various high courts issued an open letter stating that the legalisation of same-sex marriage would "change the entire gamut of all personal laws from marriage to adoption and succession. The law-making power is vested with the Parliament and not with the judiciary, especially in matters exclusively within social and political domain." The letter also noted that "instead of having wide-range discussions amongst stakeholders, such a hasty judicial intervention is unfortunate, and totally unwarranted. The court should not interfere in sensitive issues like same-sex marriage. The subject is related to society and the opinion of society on these matters is important. Parliament is paramount in making laws and the MPs elected to Parliament represent the people of the country." Critics pointed out that the retired judges built a fictitious argument that legalising same-sex marriage would increase HIV infections, "fears not supported by facts or statistics". On 1 April 2023, Mahmood Madani, representing Jamiat Ulema-e-Hind, sought to intervene in Supriyo as an opponent of same-sex marriage. Several other Islamic organisations including Jamaat-e-Islami Hind, the All India Muslim Personal Law Board, and the Telangana Markazi Shia Ulema Council also voiced their opposition to legalizing same-sex marriage. The Bar Council of India issued a statement in April urging the Supreme Court to dismiss the petition, claiming without evidence that "99 percent of Indians oppose [same-sex marriage]"; a Pew Research Center poll conducted between February and May 2023 showed that 53% of Indians supported same-sex marriage.

Oral arguments began on 18 April 2023. During the hearings, Solicitor General Tushar Mehta, representing the government, stated that "five individuals should not decide for the entire nation and issues related to human relationships, such as marriage should be addressed through legislation in Parliament." Chief Justice Dhananjaya Y. Chandrachud responded, "There is no absolute concept of a man or a woman at all. You can't tell us what to do. I won't allow this in my court." On 19 April, the government argued before the court that the concept of same-sex marriage was a "mere urban elitist view for the purpose of social acceptance". Chief Justice Chandrachud responded, "But Nepal is definitely not an urbanized and elite country.", referencing attempts to legalise same-sex marriage in Nepal. On 20 April 2023, the five-judge constitution bench led by Chandrachud hinted at their intention to legalize same-sex marriage, despite objections by the Indian Government and religious groups.

On 21 April 2023, Bhupender Yadav, the Minister of Labour and Employment and Environment, Forest and Climate Change as well as the General Secretary of the ruling Bharatiya Janata Party, stated that "the issue of marriage concerns society and society's opinion on this issue cannot be excluded. The voice of society is best reflected in Parliament". The state governments of Andhra Pradesh, Assam and Rajasthan also issued statements opposing the legal recognition of same-sex marriages. On 3 May, Solicitor General Mehta told the constitution bench that a parliamentary committee would be formed to study providing limited legal rights to same-sex partners. A lawyer representing the couples said the changes were "welcome" but "they are not a substitute for the reliefs the petitioners are seeking." The bench clarified that they would continue to hear the petition. The constitution bench concluded oral arguments on 11 May 2023, after 10 total days of hearings from petitioners and respondents.

==== Judgement ====
On 17 October 2023, the Supreme Court ruled unanimously that the legalization of same-sex marriage is a matter for the Parliament to decide, not the courts. In a 3–2 decision, it also ruled against ordering the government to introduce civil unions. However, the court unanimously accepted the government's suggestion that it set up a high-powered committee headed by the Cabinet Secretary to investigate the discrimination faced by LGBT people and study providing limited legal rights and benefits to same-sex couples, including with regard to access to joint bank accounts, recognition as next-of-kin, medical decisions for a hospitalised partner, prison visitations, and succession rights. However, the judgment did not set a timetable for establishing the committee nor any details on its composition. Chief Justice Chandrachud wrote that the court could not declare the SMA unconstitutional because this would bar inter-faith and inter-caste marriages, and argued that reading same-sex couples into the Act would violate the separation of powers:

This court cannot either strike down the constitutional validity of the Special Marriage Act or read words into the Special Marriage Act because of its institutional limitations. The court, in the exercise of the power of judicial review, must steer clear of matters, particularly those impinging on policy, which fall in the legislative domain. […] The judiciary cannot legislate.

In a dissenting opinion, Chandrachud refuted the government's arguments that homosexuality was "urban" or "elitist", and reiterated judicial precedent that discrimination on the basis of sexual orientation is prohibited by the Indian Constitution. He also stated that Parliament has the power to legalise same-sex marriage, "The institution of marriage is not static – all social institutions transform over time and marriage is no exception. Despite vehement opposition to departure from practice, the institution of marriage has changed, it has metamorphosed. It has transformed from the time of our ancestors 200 years ago." Justice Sanjay Kishan Kaul agreed with Chandrachud that same-sex relationships had been recognised in India from antiquity, "not just in terms of sexual activities but as relationships that fostered love, emotional support and mutual care", but stated that the "court cannot grant [LGBT] people the right to marry as that is a legislative exercise". The majority opinion of the court also ruled that transgender people may marry. "A transgender man can marry a transgender woman. If a transgender person wishes to marry a heterosexual person, their marriage will be recognised if one is a man and another a woman."

One of the petitioners in Supriyo filed a petition for review by the Supreme Court on 1 November. The petitioner asked the court to review the decision in light of "its self-contradictory conclusion": "The Petitioners respectfully submit that this Court ought to review and correct its decision […] because the impugned judgment suffers from errors apparent on the face of the record and is self-contradictory and manifestly unjust." The petitioner, Udit Soot, added, "The majority ruling is self-contradictory, facially erroneous and deeply unjust. The majority found that queer Indians endure severe discrimination at the hands of the State, declared that discrimination must be prohibited, and then did not take the logical next step of enjoining the discrimination." The Supreme Court agreed to hear the petition for review on 28 November, with a hearing originally scheduled for 11 July 2024. That day, Justice Sanjiv Khanna recused himself on personal grounds. The court then assembled a new panel of judges to rehear the case. On 9 January 2025, the court rejected the review petition.

=== High Court petitions on same-sex tax discrimination ===
==== Bombay High Court ====
In 2025, same-sex couples in different states approached High Courts challenging the unequal treatment of gifts between partners under Section 56(2)(x) of the Income Tax Act, 1961.

In the Bombay High Court, a couple — Payio Ashiho and Vivek Divan — filed a writ petition in August 2025 questioning the constitutionality of the word “spouse” in the section’s fifth provision. The petition argued that restricting the exemption to heterosexual spouses discriminates against same-sex partners in long-term relationships. The Bombay High Court issued notice to the Attorney General and listed the matter for further hearing.

In October 2025, the IT Department filed an affidavit against this stating that the petitioners we trying to recognize gay marriage through tax laws. In July 2026, the IT Department argued that the Income Tax Act recognises only relationships that is recognised under Indian marriage laws.

==== Karnataka High Court ====
In Oct 2025, in the Karnataka High Court, another same-sex couple — Anurag Kalia and Akhilesh Godi — filed a similar petition after one partner was advised to declare a valuable gift from his partner as taxable income. The petition sought equal protection under Article 14 and non-discrimination under Article 15 of the Constitution, arguing that the statutory exemption for “spouses” should apply equally to same-sex partners. The court issued notices to the Union Government and the Income Tax Department.

In July 2026, the Karanataka high court has asked Central government of their opinion on the case. The Central government responded that as per the act gifts are exempted from a relative, which include spouse, which is a "legally verifiable family relationship called marriage". In their case it cant be legally verified.

== Political viewpoints ==
In April 2014, Medha Patkar of the Aam Aadmi Party said that her party supports same-sex marriage, becoming the first political party in India to do so. The Trinamool Congress, the third largest party in India, also supports same-sex marriage. In 2023, General Secretary Abhishek Banerjee endorsed the legal recognition of same-sex marriages, and a party spokesperson confirmed that this reflects the party's stance. Other parties in support include the Communist Party of India (Marxist) and the Communist Party of India. The latter released a statement on 15 March 2023 criticising the BJP's opposition to same-sex marriage, categorising it as "a reflection of the Manuvādi worldview, which excludes and criminalises". On 22 April 2023, MP Binoy Viswam reiterated the party's commitment to "stand with the democratic rights" of LGBT people.

The governing Bharatiya Janata Party (BJP) opposes same-sex marriage. In 2023, the BJP-led Union Government expressed its opposition to same-sex marriage in India, calling it "urban and elitist" and arguing that its legalisation would "destroy the social fabric". On 28 July 2024, over 300 khap leaders from Gujarat, Haryana, Madhya Pradesh, Rajasthan and Uttar Pradesh urged Prime Minister Narendra Modi to pass a constitutional ban on live-in relationships and same-sex marriage and threatened to stage protests if their demands were not met. The Indian National Congress (INC), the second largest party in India, does not have an official position on the matter, but some individual party members have expressed support, including Abhishek Singhvi, Shashi Tharoor and Manish Tewari, while others have stated their opposition. The INC-led Rajasthan Government interevened politically in Supriyo to oppose same-sex marriage in India. In its electoral manifesto for the 2024 election, the INC pledged to introduce same-sex civil unions.

Other parties, including the Dravida Munnetra Kazhagam, the Biju Janata Dal, the All India Anna Dravida Munnetra Kazhagam, the Bharat Rashtra Samithi, the Nationalist Congress Party, and the Rashtriya Janata Dal, have not taken an official position on the legalisation of same-sex marriage.

== Religious performance and blessings ==
Several same-sex couples have married in Hindu temples throughout India since the late 1980s, though the marriages lack legal recognition. Reactions have ranged from support to disapproval to violent persecution. In 1987, a lesbian couple were married in a traditional Hindu ceremony in Madhya Pradesh by a Brahmin priest. The Inspector General of Police discharged them after learning about the marriage, and the couple was kept in isolation and not provided food for 48 hours. They were subjected to a "medical examination", and later left at the railway station in the middle of the night and warned against returning to the barracks. In 2010, academic Ruth Vanita reported that many of these couples were "non-English-speaking young women from lower-income groups", and "[not] connected to any movement for equality; most of them were not aware of terms like "gay" or "lesbian". Many of them framed their desire to marry in terms drawn from traditional understandings of love and marriage, saying, for example, that they could not conceive of life without each other, and wanted to live and die together." Some couples, however, have married in accordance with traditional Hindu wedding customs with support from their family and community.

On 18 September 2023, a Sikh couple were married at a gurdwara in Punjab "in all the traditional rituals and got married in the presence of the Guru Granth Sahib". The marriage proved controversial, with the Jathedar of the Akal Takht, the head of the Sikhs, condemning the wedding as "a severe moral and religious violation" which is "unnatural and contrary to Sikh ethics". Hardev Singh, the priest who performed the ceremony, was suspended.

In December 2023, the Holy See published Fiducia supplicans, a declaration allowing Catholic priests to bless couples who are not considered to be married according to church teaching, including the blessing of same-sex couples. Subsequently, the archdioceses of Bombay and Shillong announced that their clergy would be permitted to bless same-sex couples.

== Public opinion ==
Support for same-sex marriage among 18–21-year-olds according to a 2016 survey from the Varkey Foundation

According to a 2015 Ipsos poll, 29% of Indian people supported same-sex marriage, while 18% supported other forms of legal recognition. Among the 23 countries polled, India had the fifth lowest support for same-sex marriage, with only South Korea (27%), Turkey (27%), Poland (21%) and Russia (11%) showing lower support. According to a 2016 poll by the International Lesbian, Gay, Bisexual, Trans and Intersex Association, 35% of respondents were in favour of legalising same-sex marriage, while 35% were opposed. A September–October 2016 survey by the Varkey Foundation found that support for same-sex marriage was higher among 18–21-year-olds at 53%.

A 2019 poll by Mood of the Nation (MOTN) found that 24% of respondents agreed with same-sex marriages, while 62% disagreed and 14% were undecided.

A May 2021 Ipsos poll showed that 44% of Indians supported same-sex marriage, 14% supported civil unions but not marriage, while 18% were opposed to all legal recognition for same-sex couples, and 24% were undecided. However, the sample was "more urban, more educated, and/or more affluent than the general population", and so may not be representative of the entire population. A Pew Research Center poll conducted between February and May 2023 showed that 53% of Indians supported same-sex marriage (28% "strongly" and 25% "somewhat"), while 43% were opposed (31% "strongly" and 12% "somewhat") and 4% did not know or had refused to answer. Support was 52% among Hindus.

== See also ==
- LGBT rights in India
- Recognition of same-sex unions in Asia
