= Recognition of same-sex unions in Gujarat =

Gujarat does not recognise same-sex marriages or civil unions. However, live-in relationships are not unlawful in Gujarat. The Indian Supreme Court has held that adults have a constitutional right to live together without being married, and that police cannot interfere with consenting adults living together. The Gujarat High Court upheld this constitutional right in Sarvaiya Rajubhai Bachubhai v. State of Gujarat in April 2024. In addition, in June 2020 it recognised a maitri karār relationship between a same-sex couple.

In 2026, the Gujarat Legislative Assembly passed a uniform civil code establishing a unified set of personal laws governing matters such as marriage, live-in relationships, divorce, adoption and inheritance, irrespective of religion, caste or creed. The code explicitly excludes same-sex couples from its marriage and live-in relationship provisions.

== Legal history ==
=== Background ===
Marriage in India is governed under several federal laws. These laws allow for the solemnisation of marriages according to different religions, notably Hinduism, Jainism, Buddhism, Christianity, Islam, Sikhism and Zoroastrianism. Every citizen has the right to choose which law will apply to them based on their community or religion. These laws are the Hindu Marriage Act, 1955, the Indian Christian Marriage Act, 1872, the Muslim Personal Law (Shariat) Application Act, 1937, the Anand Marriage Act, 1909 and the Parsi Marriage and Divorce Act, 1936. The Special Marriage Act, 1954 (SMA; Gujarati: વિશેષ લગ્ન અધિનિયમ, ૧૯૫૪, Viśeṣ Lagna Adhiniyam; Hindi: विशेष विवाह अधिनियम, १९५४, Viśeṣ Vivāh Adhiniyam; Sindhi: خصوصي شادي قانون، ۱۹۵۴ع, Khusūsī Śādī Qānūn) (Note: Bhili: वीवा कायडो, १९५४, Vīvā Kāydo) allows civil marriage officers to solemnize and register marriages for all Indian citizens regardless of the religion of either party. Although the vast majority of marriages in India continue to be solemnized and registered under the traditional religious personal laws, the SMA has become popular among interfaith couples, inter-caste couples, and spouses with no religious beliefs. None of these acts explicitly bans same-sex marriage.

On 14 February 2006, the Supreme Court of India ruled in Smt. Seema v. Ashwani Kumar that the states and union territories are obliged to register all marriages performed under the federal laws. The court's ruling was expected to reduce instances of child marriages, bigamy, cases of domestic violence and unlawful abandonment. Subsequently, Governor Nawal Kishore Sharma signed the Gujarat Registration of Marriages Act, 2006 into law in March 2006. The act provided for the registration of all marriages performed in Gujarat, and created local registrars that issued marriage licenses to prospective spouses. Registrars could refuse to issue licenses if the parties failed to meet the requirements to marry under the federal marriage laws. The law did not explicitly ban same-sex marriages, and defined marriage simply as including remarriage. However, the act generally referred to married spouses as "bride" and "bridegroom". The law was repealed with the passage of a new uniform civil code (સમાન નાગરિક સંહિતા, samān nāgrik sanhitā) in 2026. On 24 March, the Gujarat Legislative Assembly passed the Uniform Civil Code of Gujarat Act, 2026, which is applicable to all residents of the state irrespective of religion, caste or creed. It requires the registration of all marriages and live-in relationships, but uses heteronormative terms with regard to spouses; it defines marriage and live-in relationships as being "between a man and a woman".

Traditional Gujarati marriages (લગ્ન, lagna) are deeply rooted in custom and hold significant cultural importance. They involve elaborate pre-wedding preparations and culminate in key rituals, including the tying of the mangala sutra and the saptapadi. Arranged marriage remains the prevailing norm across India, accounting for the vast majority of unions, and often placing pressure on LGBT individuals to marry partners of the opposite sex. Nevertheless, some same-sex couples have participated in traditional marriage ceremonies, although these unions lack legal recognition in Gujarat. In 2004, an interfaith same-sex couple were married in Vadodara according to both Hindu and Muslim traditions. An LGBT charity, Lakshya Trust, stated at the time: "In four years, we have facilitated at least 15 gay marriages. Gay marriages are a boon as the group is already at a high risk of contradicting HIV/AIDS. The marriages will promote single-partner sex, which will help the HIV prevention campaign." Activists said they hoped the marriage would "send a message to society that they [LGBT people] have equal rights". Several same-sex couples have entered into so-called "friendship agreements" (મૈત્રી કરાર, maitri karār, pronounced [ˈməjtɾi ˈkəɾɑɾ]) to legitimise their relationships. A maitri karār is a written document, often registered and notarized, which contains the terms and conditions on which a couple agrees to enter into cohabitation. Traditionally, a maitri karār was most commonly a contract between a married man and his unmarried mistress, used to circumvent the provisions of the Hindu Marriage Act which prohibits bigamy. The first maitri karār between a same-sex couple occurred in 1987 in the Chhota Udaipur district. A famous Gujarati resident to have entered into a same-sex marriage is Prince Manvendra Singh Gohil, probable heir of the honorary Maharaja of Rajpipla, who married his American partner Cecil "DeAndre" Richardson (né Hilton) in Seattle in July 2013.

=== Live-in relationships ===
Recognition of same-sex unions in India

Live-in relationships (Gujarati: સહવાસ સંબંધ, sahvās sambandh, pronounced [ˈsəɦʋɑs ˈsəmbə̃ndʱ], or લિવ-ઇન રિલેશનશિપ, liva-ina rileśanaśipa; Hindi: सहवास संबंध, sahvās sambandh; Sindhi: گڏ رهڻ وارو رشتو, gaḍ rahṇ wāro rishto) are not illegal in Gujarat. The Indian Supreme Court has held that adults have a constitutional right to live together without being married, that police cannot interfere with consenting adults living together, and that live-in relationships are not unlawful. State courts have sometimes upheld this constitutional right, and further ruled that if a couple faces threats from family or the community they may request police protection. However, live-in relationships do not confer all the legal rights and benefits of marriage.

In June 2020, a lesbian couple from the Mahisagar district filed a petition with the Gujarat High Court seeking police protection from their families and recognition of their right to cohabitation. The couple had entered into a maitri karār as a way to legitimise their relationship; "like in case of a marital union, it had details on property ownership, inheritance and maintenance, in case of separation." The High Court granted their petition on 23 July 2020 and ordered the police to protect the couple. Maya Sharma, an activist with the Vikalp Women's Group, said "such contracts in court cases [are used] in which one of the partners' parents were forcing marriage upon them. It has helped us get judgements in our favour." The High Court ruled similarly in April 2024 when it upheld a habeas corpus petition filed by a woman's same-sex partner, after she had been allegedly taken away by her husband and confined to her home. In Sarvaiya Rajubhai Bachubhai v. State of Gujarat, the court ruled that the woman had the right to live with her live-in partner and ordered police protection. "Since high court was in the habeas corpus jurisdiction, it just followed the wish of the corpus (plea) and allowed her to go with the petitioner [sic]", said the partner's lawyer. However, the Gujarat High Court has also dismissed similar habeas corpus petitions, generally when one of the live-in partners was already married to a third party. In Bhagwan Rajabhai Chaudhari v. State of Gujarat, Judges Vipul Pancholi and Hemant Prachchhak ruled that a live-in partner could not seek custody of a woman who was legally married to someone else. The court held in March 2023 that since the woman's lawful marriage was not dissolved, her husband's custody could not be treated as "illegal custody", even if the woman and her live-in partner were cohabiting. The court also imposed a cost of ₹5,000 on the petitioner. In addition, in a separate case involving an opposite-sex interfaith couple in October 2023, the High Court described live-in relationships as "timepass" and mere "infatuation".

=== Transgender and intersex issues ===
Like most of South Asia, Gujarat recognizes a traditional third gender community known as hijra (પાવૈયા, pāvaiyā, or હીજડો, hījṛo), historically holding respected community roles, and known for their distinct culture, communities led by gurus, and traditional roles as performers. Media outlets have reported that the local Kutchi culture in Anjar celebrates ritualistic transgender marriages every year during the festival of Holi, a custom that has been followed for over 150 years. The Supreme Court's 2023 ruling in Supriyo v. Union of India held that the Indian Constitution does not require the legalisation of same-sex marriages but affirmed that transgender people may marry opposite-sex partners.

== See also ==
- LGBT rights in India
- Recognition of same-sex unions in India
- Supriyo v. Union of India
