= Adhila Nasarin v. Commissioner of Police, Ernakulam =

Indian LGBT rights case law

Adhila Nasarin v. State Commissioner of Police
- Court: Kerala High Court
- Full case name: Adhila Nasarin versus State Commissioner of Police & Ors.
- Decided: 31 May 2022
- Citation: W. P. (CRL) No. 476 of 2022

Court membership
- Judges sitting: K.Vinod Chandran CJ. and C. Jayachandran J.

Case opinions
- The consenting adults in a relationship should be allowed to live their lives according to their informed choice, regardless of gender.
- Decision by: K.Vinod Chandran CJ. and C. Jayachandran J.

Keywords
- Cohabitation Rights, Same-sex Relationship

Adhila Nasarin versus State Commissioner of Police & Ors. (2022) is a case where Kerala High Court held that the adults in a mutually consenting relationship should be allowed to live their lives according to their informed choice, regardless of gender.

== Background ==
Adhila Nassrin is reported to be involved in a relationship with Fathima Noora, a situation met with disapproval from both sets of parents. Adhila Nassrin argues that, after deciding to live together, they sought refuge at a Safe Home in Kozhikode with the support of the NGO Vanaja Collective, before informing their parents. Following parental assurances of resolution, the couple were taken to a relative's residence. However, subsequently, Fathima Noora was forcefully expelled from the house. Allegations also indicate that Adhila Nassrin's father, returning from abroad, assaulted Adhila Nassrin. In pursuit of protection, Adhila Nassrin took shelter in an Aluva Safe Home and has now filed this writ petition, asserting that her partner, Fathima Noora, has been unlawfully confined by Fathima Noora's parents.

=== Police Response and Awareness ===
Although the couple received some assistance from the Binanipuram Police in Kerala after their forced separation, the Thamarassery Police declined Adhila Nassrin's request to file a missing person's report for Fathima Noora. The Thamarassery police categorized Fathima Noora's abduction as a "family matter" beyond police involvement, revealing a lack of queer community awareness within law enforcement. Moreover, a report by The Wire suggested that the Thamarassery Police supported Fathima Noora's family in separating the couple. The Thamarassery police's indifference exacerbated the situation, prompting Adhila Nassrin to escalate the matter to the High Court, which might have been resolved at the local police level. The News18 reported that the Binanipuram Police attempted to take the couple to the police station for a compromise with the parents, even after the High Court's order, which further affected the couple's mental well-being.

The current case underscores the necessity for heightened queer rights awareness and training among police personnel, including the incorporation of mandatory queer sensitivity training into police education. Additionally, the case underscores the need for stricter consequences for queerphobic behavior and deliberate disregard of queer community concerns by law enforcement.

=== Familial Violence and Abuse ===
Adhila Nassrin and Fathima Noora endured very abusive treatment from their families, facing physical and psychological abuse before obtaining a High Court order in the current case. The couple reported that the psychological abuse persisted even after the court ruling.

The family constitutes the primary source of psychological, physical, and sexual abuse against queer individuals in India, perpetuating a normalization of such abuse within the queer community. Indian queer women encounter an endemic and deeply ingrained pattern of violence perpetrated by both intimate and extended family members, which includes instances of psychological and verbal abuse, physical harm, coerced marriages, unlawful confinement, medical mistreatment, and instances of corrective rape.

The current case underscores the necessity for more stringent laws against these abuses, frequently excused as 'family care and concern.' Additionally, it accentuates the importance of enhancing public understanding of the queer community and advocating for comprehensive sex education.

=== Impact of Conversion Therapy ===
Amid their separation, Adhila Nasarin feared Fathima Noora might be subjected to 'conversion therapy' by her family. When reunited, Fathima Noora revealed that she had undergone counseling at a 'conversion therapy' center near Karippur airport, which was operated by a 'religious' counselor. Fathima Noora recounted being pressured by a mullah to conform to religious beliefs and engage in a heterosexual relationship, leading to mental and physical distress. After such traumatic experiences, Fathima Noora emphasized that a person could understandably succumb to family wishes after enduring such emotional turmoil.

Although the National Medical Commission had deemed conversion therapy as 'professional misconduct' in response to a directive from the Madras High Court in the case of S Sushma v. Commissioner of Police, it's important to note that AYUSH practitioners, who practice alternative medicine systems like Ayurveda, Yoga, Naturopathy, Unani, Siddha, Sowa Rigpa, and Homeopathy, operate beyond the regulatory scope of the National Medical Commission. Notably, Fathima Noora underwent faith-based conversion therapy, a matter that remains unaddressed in India.

The current case underscores the necessity for legal action against practitioners of conversion therapy who claim to alter sexual orientations or gender identity through their methods in India.

=== Role of Support Networks ===
The Vanaja Collective, a non-governmental organization in Calicut, played a pivotal role in aiding the couple throughout their ordeal. It provided initial shelter and robust legal and moral backing in their fight for the fundamental human right to live as partners. In cases where the family, traditionally a source of support, becomes the abuser, alternative networks like the Vanaja collective play a crucial role in assisting queer individuals.

While some state-driven initiatives, like shelter homes, training, and scholarships, target transgender individuals in Kerala, Adhila Nasarin and Fathima Noora's experience underscores the necessity for expanded governmental mechanisms providing comprehensive legal and social support for the entire queer spectrum. Apart from initiating new support programs, the state should enhance the implementation of existing government initiatives. Adequate state backing for non-governmental and community-based organizations should form part of these endeavors to safeguard the rights of the queer community.

== Proceedings ==
A report from the Deputy Superintendent of Police of Aluva indicated that the officer attempted to communicate with Fathima Noora over the phone, and her mother informed the officer that Fathima Noora had gone with them of her own free will. Although the court was unconvinced by the claim made by Fathima Noora's mother and was considering initiating a suo motu writ petition, an advocate advocated for the filing of a Writ Petition (Criminal) on the same day regarding the detention of Fathima Noora.

Subsequently, the court was informed that both Adhila Nassrin and Fathima Noora were present at the Binanipuram Police Station alongside their respective parents. As the Government stated that the parents were now amenable and that the couple could be produced within an hour, the court directed the appearance of both Adhila Nassrin and Fathima Noora in the court. The justices held private conversations with Fathima Noora in their chamber, during which Fathima Noora expressed her determination to continue the relationship. However, she categorically informed the justices that she had no complaints against her parents. Likewise, the justices also had private discussions with Adhila Nassrin, who also expressed her intention to continue the relationship.

The Circle Inspector of Police, Sunil V.R., from the Binanipuram Police Station, Ernakulam Rural, informed the court that the parents were now reconciled to the desires of their children. He presented consent letters issued by the respective parents.

== Opinion of the Court ==
Following the private conversations with Adhila Nassrin and Fathima Noora, the court held that Adhila Nassrin and Fathima Noora should be allowed to live their lives according to their informed choice. The court directed that the couple, in accordance with their desire, be returned to the Safe Home at present.

The verdict of the Bench noticeably lacks legal precedents, thorough analysis, and comprehensive reasoning to substantiate its conclusions.

== Related Cases ==
=== High Court Cases ===
This section delves into relevant cases from the High Courts of India. It's important to note that judgments rendered by one High Court do not hold mandatory authority over another, but they can still be regarded as influential precedents.

==== Sreeja S v. Commissioner of Police ====
In the preceding case of Sreeja S v. Commissioner of Police (2018), Sreeja submitted a petition to the Kerala High Court seeking a writ of Habeas Corpus to compel the presentation of her same-sex romantic partner, Aruna, and ensure Aruna's liberty. While the court acted based on the petitioner's and alleged detainee's informed consent in both instances, differing from the Adhila Nasarin v. State Commissioner of Police case, the Bench in the Sreeja S v. Commissioner of Police case laid a robust legal groundwork by citing legal precedents and constitutional principles and rights. The Bench referenced Supreme Court precedents such as Soni Gerry v. Gerry Douglas (2018), which established that the court cannot curtail the personal freedom of an adult under the doctrine of parens patriae; Nandakumar v. State of Kerala (2018), which ruled that adults lacking legal capacity for marriage can cohabit without formal wedlock; and Shafin Jahan V. Asokan (2018), which underscored the court's role in habeas corpus petitions as ensuring the detainee's independent choice while refraining from assessing partner suitability.

Additionally, the Bench in the Sreeja S v. Commissioner of Police case relied on Navtej Singh Johar v. Union of India (2018), which established that the discrimination based on sexual orientation infringes on fundamental rights and asserted that constitutional morality should not be compromised for social morality. Furthermore, the Bench highlighted that the Indian Parliament recognizes 'live-in relationships' under the Protection of Women from Domestic Violence Act of 2005. The Bench observed that the court should abstain from evaluating the suitability of the partner, asserting that not taking action could potentially jeopardize Constitutional rights; consequently, the court issued a writ of Habeas Corpus, granting Aruna the freedom to be with Sreeja.

The Supreme Court of India recognized Sreeja S v. Commissioner of Police (2018) as a significant ruling by a High Court in its "Sensitisation Module for the Judiciary on LGBTIQA+ Community," which addresses the challenges that marginalized queer individuals face within the justice system due to systemic marginalization. The publication highlighted the observations of the High Court on aspects such as women's consent and adulthood, alongside the acknowledgment of 'live-in relationships' among same-sex couples, signifies progress in the acknowledgment of the rights of marginalized queer individuals.

== See also ==
- LGBT rights in India
- Deepika Singh v. Central Administrative Tribunal (2022)
- S Sushma v. Commissioner of Police (2021)
- Navtej Singh Johar v. Union of India (2018)
