= Friendship contract =

In the Netherlands, a friendship contract ('vriendschapscontract') is an agreement which regulates the consequences of a social relationship between two or more persons under family law as well as property law. Such a contract has no prescribed form. From an evidential point of view a written or notarial form is preferred. In addition, parties are in principle (see article 3:40 of the Dutch Civil Code (Burgerlijk Wetboek (BW)) free to determine the content of their agreement. For example, a tangible or intangible duty of care can be established, a power of attorney can be granted in case a party can no longer act on his own behalf, and an arrangement can be made for the event that one party obtains a good that, in whole or in part, is financed with assets of the other. In the Dutch law of persons and Dutch family law, there is no legal effect attached to friendship contracts; this not expected to change in the near future. The friendship contract is therefore currently governed by general Dutch contract and property law.

== The first friendship contract ==
The first friendship contract was concluded in the Netherlands between best friends Joost Janmaat and Christiaan Fruneaux (who do not have a love affair together). The notarised contract was executed before civil-law notary Maarten Meijer on May 7, 2015. This movement stems from the desire to introduce the institute of friendship into Dutch law. Janmaat and Fruneaux believe that friendship is playing an – increasingly – important role in society, which should also be legally recognized in certain areas of law. For example, they have in mind a lower inheritance tax rate for friends and the right not to testify against your best friend. The thought that the family is the only cornerstone of society is considered passé. Friends are, in practice, more and more on an equal par with family members and/or life partners.

== Public reactions ==
- The chairman of the Dutch Humanist Association (Humanistisch Verbond), Boris van der Ham, also calls for the legal recognition of friendship in (and outside) the Netherlands in the members' magazine HUMAN. In his opinion the Dutch law does not reflect current reality on this issue.
- The foundation Centrum Individu en Samenleving (CISA) sees the increasing number of persons living in different social arrangements than marriage as a reason to break the unilateral focus on marriage.

== See also ==
- Since July 1, 2015 an employee can take a short- or long-term paid care leave for the care of a social relationship (provided that the care directly ensues from this relationship and it is reasonable that the care is provided by the employee).
- Member of Parliament Wouter Koolmees (D66) has proposed a motion to grant singles without children the opportunity to appoint one other social relation who can inherit at the reduced tax rate that applies to descendants in the second or further degree.

== See also ==
- Civil Union
- Contract
- Family law
- Friendship
- Interpersonal relationship
- Maitri Karar
- Marriage
- Samenlevingscontract
