= Nata pratha =

Local custom in Rajasthan, India

Nata pratha is an ancient local custom in the Rajasthan state in northwest India whereby a married man can legitimize an affair with a married woman by formally providing financial support for her.

== See also ==
- Maitri Karar
