= Maitri karar =

Illegal traditional contract system of Gujarat

Maitri karar (friendship contract) is a traditional contract system of Gujarat, now illegal, that legitimizes a matrimonial-type relationship, most commonly between a married man and his unmarried mistress. It provides for a similar live-in relationship to the custom of nata pratha that is practiced in parts of Rajasthan and Madhya Pradesh.

A maitri karar is commonly used to circumvent the provisions of the Hindu Marriage Act, which prohibits bigamy. The contract is drawn up by a Sub-Registrar with his seal of affidavit on a stamp-paper of Rs. 10, signed by both parties with two witnesses. Each contract is customized to the needs of the two parties, and prescribes financial support by the man to his partner. Though it was never legally enforceable, and indeed is now illegal, maitri karar were meant to provide a degree of security to unmarried woman.
