= Arranged marriage in the Indian subcontinent =

Arranged marriage is a tradition in the societies of the Indian subcontinent, and continues to account for an overwhelming majority of marriages in the Indian subcontinent. Despite the fact that romantic love is "wholly celebrated" in both Indian mass media (such as Bollywood) and folklore, and the arranged marriage tradition lacks any official legal recognition or support, the institution has proved to be "surprisingly robust" in adapting to changed social circumstances and has defied predictions of decline as India modernized.

Arranged marriages are believed to have initially risen to prominence in the Indian subcontinent when the historical Vedic religion gradually gave way to classical Hinduism (the c. 500 BCE period), substantially displacing other alternatives that were once more prominent. In the urban culture of modern India, the differentiation between arranged and love marriages is increasingly seen as a "false dichotomy" with the emergence of phenomena such as "self-arranged marriages" and free-choice on the part of the prospective spouses.

== History ==
The Indian subcontinent has historically been home to a wide variety of wedding systems. Some were unique to the region, such as Swayamvara (which was rooted in the historical Vedic religion and had a strong hold in popular culture because it was the procedure used by Rama and Sita). In a swayamvara, the girl's parents broadcast the intent of the girl to marry and invited all interested men to be present in a wedding hall on a specific date and time.

The girl, who was also often given some prior knowledge about the man or was aware of their general reputation, would circulate the hall and indicate her choice by garlanding the man she wanted to marry. Sometimes the father of the bride would arrange for a competition among the suitors, such as a feat of strength, to help in the selection process. Another variant was the Gandharva marriage, which involved simple mutual consent between a man and a woman based on mutual attraction and no rituals or witnesses. The marriage of Dushyanta and Shakuntala was an example of this marriage. In the Mithila region of the Indian subcontinent, there is a well arranged system of marriage known as Maithil Vivah in which bride and groom are married according to the choice of their parents.

As the Vedic religion evolved into classical orthodox Hinduism (ca. 500 BC), the social ideas advanced by Manu gained prominence, and large sections of Indian society moved towards patriarchy and caste-based rules. Manu and others attacked the Gandharva and other similar systems, decrying them as holdouts "from the time of promiscuity" which, at best, were only suitable for small sections of society. Under the system they advocated (sometimes called Manuvad), women were stripped of their traditional independence and placed permanently in male custodianship: first of their fathers in childhood, then of their husbands through married life, and finally of their sons in old age.

It is also speculated that parental control of marriage may have emerged during this period as a mechanism to prevent the intermixing of ethnic groups and castes. Early marriage, in which girls were married before they reached puberty also became prevalent, though not universal, over time. This emergence of early arranged marriages in the Indian subcontinent was consistent with similar developments elsewhere, such as Indonesia, various Muslim regions and South Pacific societies. Commentators on both Hindu and European Jewish communities (where early arranged marriages had also gained prevalence) have hypothesized that the system may have emerged because "the answer to the raging hormones associated with teenage sexuality was early, arranged marriage."

With kinship groups being viewed a primary unit to which social loyalty was owed by individuals, marriage became an affair deeply impacting the entire family for Indian Hindus and Muslims alike and key to "the formation or maintenance of family alliances." Sometimes, these arrangements were made at the birth of the future husband and wife with promises exchanged between the two families. Where specific alliances were socially preferred, often an informal right of first refusal was presumed to exist. For instance, marriages between cousins is permissible in Islam (though not in most Hindu communities), and the girl's mother's sister (or khala) was considered to have the first right (pehla haq) to "claim" the girl as for her son (the khalazad bhai).

Systems such as watta satta (exchange marriages, which occur in rural Punjab) evolved where two families unite by exchanging women in two brother-sister pairs through marriage. As with other cultures, levirate marriages (where the brother of a deceased man is obligated to marry his widow) also became customary in some regions for all religious groups, partially to ensure that clan alliances and clan ownership of land rights remained intact even if the husband died.

== Developments in the modern period ==
With the expanding social reform and female emancipation that accompanied economic and literacy growth after independence, many commentators predicted the gradual demise of arranged marriages in India, and the inexorable rise of so-called "love marriages" (i.e. where the initial contact with potential spouses does not involve the parents or family members). That has not yet come to pass and the institution proved to be "remarkably resilient" in the Indian social context, though it has undergone radical change.

Commonly in urban areas and increasingly in rural parts, parents now arrange for marriage-ready sons and daughters to meet with multiple potential spouses with an accepted right of refusal. These arranged marriages are effectively the result of a wide search by both the girl's family and the boy's family. Child marriages are also in steady decline and deemed unlawful in India (with legal age of marriage at 21 years for men and 18 years for women), so the term "arranged marriage" now increasingly refers to marriages between consenting adults well past the age of sexual maturity. Due to this, a strong distinction is now drawn by sociologists and policymakers between arranged marriages (which involve consenting adults that have choice and unhindered rights of refusal) and forced marriages.

Another significant trend in arranged marriages is related to the loosening of traditional clan-bonds in India. Where potential spouses for sons and daughters were once identified through family and social relationships, they are increasingly being solicited through advertising because many urban parents no longer have the social reach that was a given before the rise of nuclear families in India. With the advent of the internet, this has led to the rise of matchmaking websites such as shaadi.com (shaadi is the Hindustani word for wedding), which claims to be the largest matrimonial service in the world.

=== Self-arranged marriages ===
It is increasingly common in India for a couple that has met by themselves and are involved romantically to go through the process of an arranged marriage with that specific partner in mind. Since arranged marriages result in a deep meshing and unification of extended families and are believed to contribute to marital stability, many couples orchestrate their marriages with each other through the processes of an arranged marriage. These marriages are often referred to as "self-arranged marriages" or "love-arranged marriages" in India.

The emerging trend of "self-arranged marriages" in South Asia represents a fusion of both arranged and love marriage dynamics, reflecting the enduring societal pressures to formalize family unions through matrimonial processes. In this contemporary approach, couples may independently initiate their connection but opt for an arranged marriage framework to meet societal expectations and uphold family honor. Research conducted by Parul Bhandari on the role of families in modern South Asian marriages reveals that while parents may not necessarily control their children's romantic relationships, they wield a significant influence over the outcomes of these relationships. Bhandari's findings suggest that self-arranged marriages in present-day South Asia involve substantial parental involvement, notably through traditions such as the ritual of "meeting the parents." During this ceremonial practice, individuals seeking to marry seek the approval of their intended spouse from their parents. While not exclusive to South Asian cultures, within the context of South Asian matchmaking, parental opinions carry considerable weight in the decision-making process for the marrying individuals.

== The arranged marriage process ==
Arranged marriages vary widely by region and community across the Indian subcontinent. The marriage process usually begins with a realization in the family that a child is old enough to marry. For a girl, it is during her graduation or early twenties; for a boy, it is after he is 'settled', with a decent job and consistent earnings. The initiation can occur when a parent or a relative (such as an aunt or an elder sister or sister-in-law) initiates a conversation on the topic or the son/daughter approaches the parent/relative and expresses the desire to be married. This relative effectively acts as a sponsor, taking responsibility to get the boy/girl married to a good partner.

=== Finding a matchmaker ===
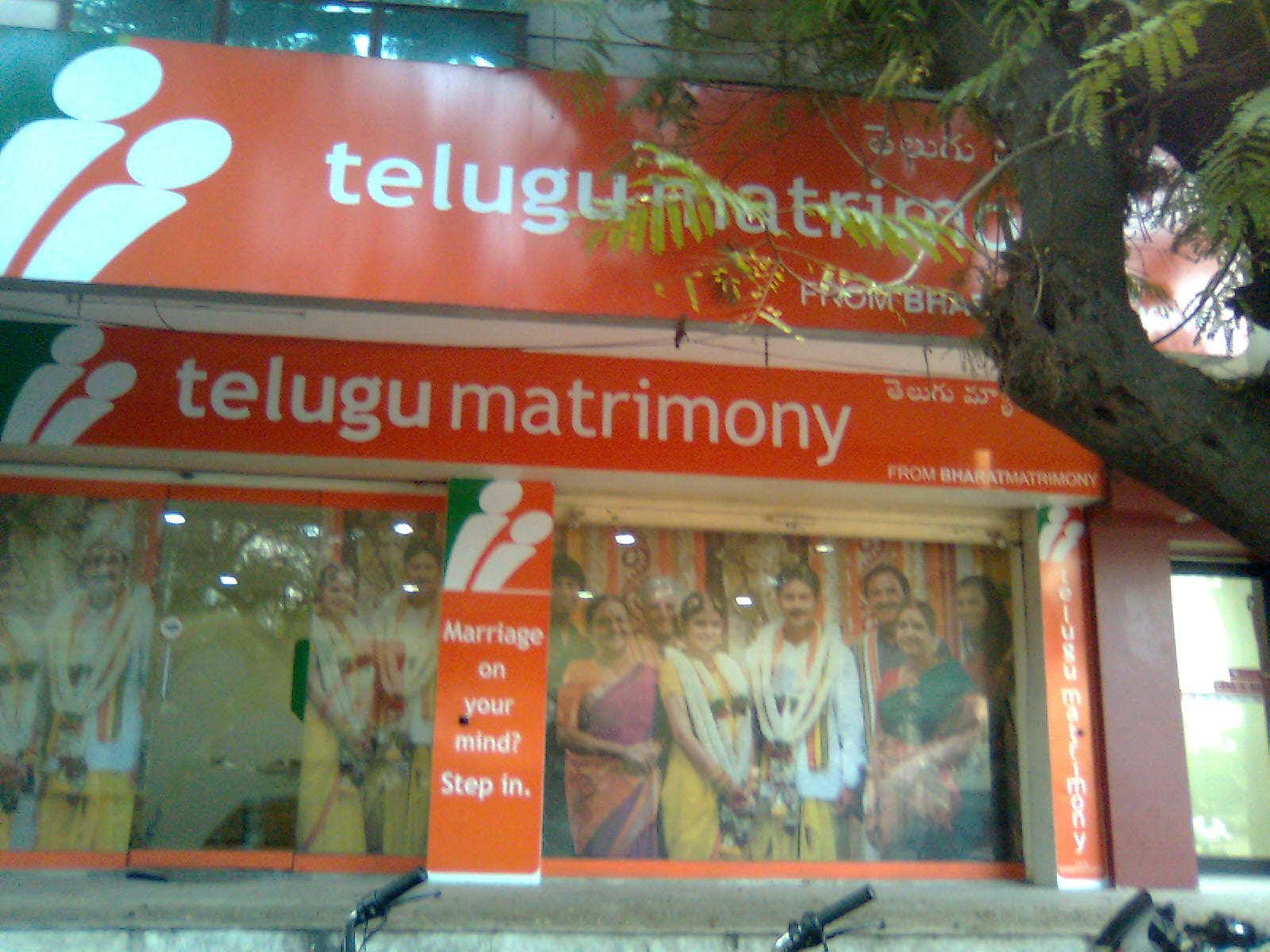
An advertisement for an online partner finding company, Hyderabad, India.

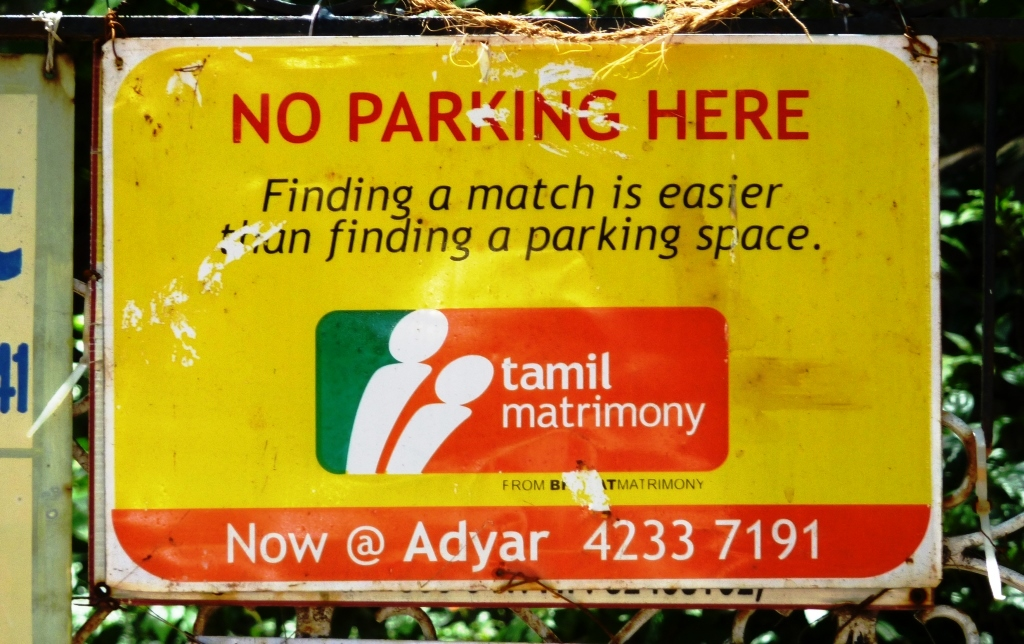
"Finding a match is easier than finding a parking space", Chennai, India.

If the son/daughter has an identified love interest, the sponsor often takes it upon themselves to try to orchestrate a match with that individual. If no such person exists, the sponsor begins the process of identifying suitable candidates. This is usually done via an intermediary matchmaker who has a social reputation for maintaining discretion and brokering successful weddings. The sponsor approaches the matchmaker with a photograph and the child's horoscope. The matchmaker is often an elderly socialite who is liked and widely connected to many families.

In some regions, specific professions are associated with matchmaking. For instance, in many parts of North India and Pakistan, the local barber (or nai) was a frequent go-between. To avoid social embarrassments, complete secrecy is often maintained for any marriage discussions. If no good matchmaker is accessible to the family, the family may resort to matrimonial advertising in newspapers or matrimonial websites.

=== Match criteria ===
The family expresses their criteria for a good match to the matchmaker, which is usually heavily influenced by family considerations but also includes the personal preferences of the son/daughter. These considerations vary but can include

- Religion: Marriages are usually arranged between individuals belonging to the same religion. Same-religion marriages are the norm in arranged marriages among higher caste people.
- Caste and culture: Usually, first preference is given to the same caste. The ancestry of the individual and the family's culture and traditions also play an important part. Usually, prospective spouses are looked for from families belonging to the same region and having the same language and food habits.
- Profession and status: The profession, financial position and the social status of the individual are also taken into account. This has a higher evaluation criteria in case of men. Also, in significantly high number of cases, there is obsession for Government Job in case of men since these are considered to be safer and offer more stability.
- Horoscope Matching: Although not absolutely necessary, many communities of North and South India have a practice of matching Horoscopes of men and women before the alliance. Match making based on Horoscopes involves Astrology based predictions and evaluates compatibilities of the two individuals. In north India it is called Kundali while in South it is known as Nakshatram.
- Age: Most often, a man older than the woman is sought, ideally with no more than a 5-year difference in age.
- Physical appearances of the individual is taken into account in some cases, more so for women. Also, the height of the man is sought to be more than that of the woman. Many Indian families are obsessed with fairness of the woman. Matrimonial advertisement often advertise skin pigmentation of the woman such as Fair, Wheatish etc. Fair tones are considered to be advantageous.

Matrimonial websites frequently use some of these factors to enable prospective matches.

=== Exchange of photographs/information with prospective matches ===
The matchmaker identifies a set of potential matches and, based on mutual agreement between families, it is customary for an exchange of photographs and some documentation of the factors being considered (for instance, astrological charts or a resume/biodata) to follow. These items are usually returnable if the match does not proceed: In those scenarios, families customarily cooperate to eliminate any trace of a matchmaking conversation between them. The son/daughter reviews the information and photographs, with input from the family and friends, and shortlists a few for in-person meetings.

=== Meeting prospective spouses ===
If the prospective partners express a desire to meet or if the families are enthusiastic about a potential match, it is customary for the prospective groom's family to visit the prospective bride's family. It is traditional for the man's family to arrive (with the man) and be seated with the entire woman's family except the woman, who then makes a dramatic entrance dressed in fine clothes, often bringing tea and refreshments. This practice is sometimes called "seeing the girl" and has been attacked by some Indian and Pakistani feminists as a classic instance of gender-bias and the objectification of women. During this visit, the man and woman are often encouraged to meet and talk by themselves in a separate room.

The families usually part after this initial meeting without any commitment made by either side and with the expectation that they will confer separately and send word through the matchmaker should they be interested in pursuing matters. These meetings are understood to be non-exclusive, i.e., both the man and woman are expected to similarly meet with other potential partners at this stage. There is an expectation of total confidentiality. Families do not usually disclose who else is being considered for their son/daughter and expect reciprocal confidentiality from the other party.

If there is interest from both sides, the matchmaker passes the word to them. If the families are unfamiliar with each other or live in areas far apart, they will frequently launch inquiries through their social and kin networks, attempting to gather as much independent information as possible about the prospective partner. Since urban Indian nuclear families often lack these extensive networks, many private detective agencies have begun to offer "matrimonial investigation services" since the 1980s, which investigate the personal and professional histories of a prospective spouse for a fee.

=== Engagement ===
Once there is mutual agreement between the prospective bride and groom that they would like to marry, and no red flags have emerged about either party in the inquiries conducted formally or informally, the other prospective spouses are declined and their photographs and other documents returned. Families usually attempt to maintain a high level of cordiality in these interactions, often invoking the idea of sanjog (predestined relationship, roughly equivalent to the idea that "marriages are made in heaven") to defuse any sense of rancor or rejection.

An engagement ceremony or a pre-engagement ceremony (such as roka) follows. In urban areas, the future spouses are often expected to go out on dates and develop a romantic relationship in the period between their engagement and their wedding. In more conservative rural areas, a period of greater freedom in interaction, or even romantic courtship, between the man and woman follows. Though dating may not be socially permissible, nonetheless the couple may talk over the phone.

== Low incidence of divorce in India ==
In India, marriage is thought to be for life, and the divorce rate is extremely low. In 2021, India recorded the lowest divorce rate in the world at just 0.1 divorces per 1000 people. In contrast, the divorce rate in the United States was significantly higher, at 2.5 per 1000. The Indian figure, however, appears to be rising. Opinion is mixed on the implications of this change: "for traditionalists the rising numbers portend the breakdown of society while, for some modernists, they speak of a healthy new empowerment for women."

== See also ==
- Child marriage in India
- Dowry system in India
- Dowry death
- Hindu joint family
- Inter-caste marriage

General:

- Arranged marriages
- Love marriage
- Matchmaking
- Marriage market
