= C. Jayachandran =

Indian judge

Justice C. Jayachandran

Judge of the Kerala High Court
- Incumbent
- Assumed office 20 October 2021

Personal details
- Born: Chandrasekharan Kartha Jayachandran; 28 May 1972 (age 54)
- Education: Kerala Law Academy; Mahatma Gandhi University, Kerala
- Website: High Court of Kerala

Chandrasekharan Kartha Jayachandran (സി. ജയചന്ദ്രൻ; born 28 May 1972) is an Indian judge presently serving as an additional judge of the Kerala High Court. Headquartered at Ernakulam, Kochi, this is the highest court in the Indian state of Kerala and in the union territory of Lakshadweep. Jayachandran was appointed as an additional judge of the High Court with effect from 20 October 2021. He had joined the judicial service directly as an additional district judge in February 2011, and worked as Principal District Judge in Kollam, Thiruvananthapuram and Kottayam.

He completed a LLB at the Kerala Law Academy and an LLM at the Mahatma Gandhi University, Kerala.
