= Kerala Gazette =

Government gazette of Kerala, India

The Kerala Gazette is an official weekly journal released by the government of Kerala, India. The Kerala Gazette publishes all the texts of the new laws and government decisions in Kerala. Kerala Gazette notification is the official authentication of the Kerala government.

Government Advertisements are given free of cost upon official request from concerned Departments. From October 2021, the Gazette was also published online.

Any adult or an adult on behalf of his guardianship for minors can give private advertisements in the Kerala Gazette. In respect of change of name/signature/religion and correction of casts made on payment basis and on prescribed forms available from the Superintendent of Govt. Presses at the Government Central Press, Thiruvananthapuram and at various District Forms Offices directly or by post upon request.
