= Sreeja S. v. Commissioner of Police =

Indian LGBT Rights Case Law

Sreeja S v. Commissioner of Police
- Court: Kerala High Court
- Full case name: Sreeja S versus Commissioner of Police & Ors.
- Decided: 24 September 2018
- Citation: W. P. (CRL) No. 372 of 2018

Court membership
- Judges sitting: C. K. Abdul Rehim CJ. and R. Narayana Pisharadi J.

Case opinions
- The separating the adults in a consensual relationship is a violation of the Constitutional right, regardless of their sexual orientation.
- Decision by: C. K. Abdul Rehim CJ. and R. Narayana Pisharadi J.

Keywords
- Cohabitation Rights, Queer Relationships

Sreeja S versus Commissioner of Police & Ors. (2018) is case where Kerala High Court held that separating the adults in a consensual relationship is a violation of the Constitutional right, regardless of their sexual orientation.

The Supreme Court of India acknowledged this case in its publication titled "Sensitisation Module for the Judiciary on LGBTIQA+ Community" as one of the High Court judgments that effectively addressed the difficulties and obstacles experienced by queer individuals within the justice system due to their systemic marginalization.

== Background ==
The petitioner, Sreeja, a 40-year-old woman residing in Kollam, India, is engaged in a same-sex consensual relationship with the alleged detainee, Aruna, a 24-year-old woman. On August 13, 2018, Aruna left her parental home to live with Sreeja. Subsequently, Aruna's mother filed a missing person's complaint for Aruna with the sub-inspector of police in Parassala. Following this, the police took Aruna into custody and presented her before the Judicial First Class Magistrate Court of Neyyattinkara on August 14, 2018. The magistrate ordered Aruna's release.

However, Aruna's parents purportedly took her into custody again after allegedly assaulting Sreeja. Aruna informed Sreeja that her parents had admitted her to the Government Mental Health Center at Peroorkada. When Sreeja visited Aruna at the hospital, Aruna expressed her willingness to leave with Sreeja. Nonetheless, the hospital authorities insisted on the presentation of a court order for her release along with Aruna. In light of these circumstances, Sreeja filed a petition seeking a writ of Habeas Corpus to command the production of Aruna and secure her freedom.

== Proceedings ==
In response to the court's notification, both Aruna and her parents appeared before the bench. During the proceedings, Aruna openly acknowledged her relationship with Sreeja and their mutual decision to live together. Aruna emphatically expressed her strong desire to accompany Sreeja to Sreeja's residence in West Kallada, Kollam. Aruna firmly stated her refusal to return to her parental home alongside her parents. Aruna's account highlighted that she believes her parents are unlawfully detaining her, and she was taken to the Government Mental Health Center in Peroorkada despite being in a sound mental state.

== Opinion of the Court ==
The bench drew upon the judgment of the Supreme Court in Soni Gerry v. Gerry Douglas (2018), wherein it was observed that the court cannot assume the role of parens patriae and curtail the liberty of an individual who has reached the age of majority.

Similarly, the bench referred to the judgment of the Supreme Court in Nandakumar v. State of Kerala (2018), which firmly established that even if the parties are not legally competent to marry, they possess the right to cohabit even without formal wedlock. The bench also highlighted the recognition of 'live-in relationships' by the Parliament of India under the provisions of the Protection of Women from Domestic Violence Act of 2005.

Furthermore, the bench cited Supreme Court's decision in Shafin Jahan v. Asokan (2018), which emphasized the court's role in habeas corpus petitions to ascertain the independent choice of the detainee and to exercise caution in avoiding assessments of partner suitability for marital life. The Bench noted the application of the cited precedents by the Kerala High Court in Mohammed Riyad v. State Police Chief (2018), wherein it was ruled that there's no requirement for the court to scrutinize the legality of the petitioner's relationship with the alleged detainee.

Finally, the Bench noted the Supreme Court's remarks in the case of Navtej Singh Johar v. Union of India (2018), where the Supreme Court emphasized that discriminating based on sexual orientation infringes upon the fundamental right, and asserted that constitutional morality should not be compromised for social morality.

The bench held that the cohabiting relationship between Sreeja and Aruna does not contravene any legal provisions or amount to a criminal offense, and abstaining from exercising the court's jurisdiction would risk the infringement of Constitutional rights. Therefore, the bench exercised its jurisdiction by issuing a writ of Habeas Corpus, thereby granting Aruna the freedom to be with Sreeja according to her wishes.

== Impact ==
Sreeja S v. Commissioner of Police is the first Indian case concerning same-sex relationships after the Supreme Court's decriminalization of homosexuality in Navtej Singh Johar v. Union of India (2018), which saw its ruling issued on the 17th day following the Navtej Singh Johar verdict.

The Supreme Court of India acknowledged this case in its publication "Sensitisation Module for the Judiciary on LGBTIQA+ Community," recognizing it as a significant High Court judgment that effectively addresses the difficulties encountered by marginalized queer individuals while navigating the justice system due to systemic marginalization. The publication highlighted the High Court's emphasis on women's consent and adulthood, asserting that it should not assume the role of parens patriae as long as individuals' choices are preserved. Additionally, the publication emphasized the High Court's stance that a 'live-in relationship' between two women is neither criminal nor illegal.

== See also ==
- LGBT rights in India
- Adhila Nasarin v. State Commissioner of Police (2022)
- Chinmayee Jena v. State of Odisha (2020)
- Navtej Singh Johar v. Union of India (2018)
