= Parsi Marriage and Divorce Act, 1936 =

Law controlling marriages of Parsis living in India

Imperial Legislative Council
- Long title: An Act to amend the law relating to marriage and divorce among Parsis.
- Citation: Act No. 3 of 1936
- Enacted by: Imperial Legislative Council
- Enacted: 23 April 1936
- Assented to by: Governor-General of India
- Commenced: 22 June 1936
- Status: In force (amended)

The Parsi Marriage and Divorce Act, 1936 is a law enacted by the Imperial Legislative Council (under British India) to regulate marriage and divorce among Parsis. The Act provides for the legal recognition, solemnization, and dissolution of marriages within the Parsi community, along with provisions for custody, alimony, and other matrimonial matters. This law applies exclusively to Parsis, defined as individuals following the Zoroastrian faith.

== Background ==
The need for a distinct legal framework arose due to the unique customs and practices of the Parsi community, which could not be effectively regulated by general marriage laws applicable to other religious groups in India. The Act sought to align with traditional Parsi norms while incorporating modern legal principles. It replaced earlier regulations governing Parsi marriages, consolidating them into a more comprehensive statute.

The law has undergone several amendments since its inception to align with social changes and evolving perspectives on marriage, family rights, and gender equality.

== Key Provisions ==
=== 1. Solemnization of Marriage ===
A marriage between two Parsis must be solemnized by a Parsi priest (known as a mobed) and in the presence of at least two witnesses. The Act sets the minimum age for marriage at 21 years for males and 18 years for females. Both parties must give free consent, and marriages are declared void if consent is obtained through fraud or coercion.

=== 2. Conditions for Validity of Marriage ===
Both parties to the marriage must be Parsis by religion at the time of the wedding. Neither party should have a living spouse (polygamy is prohibited). Marriages between certain degrees of prohibited relationships are void under the Act.

=== 3. Registration of Marriage ===
Every Parsi marriage must be registered with the registrar appointed under the Act, and failure to do so can lead to penalties. A marriage certificate issued by the registrar serves as proof of the marriage.

=== 4. Divorce and Judicial Separation ===
The Act provides several grounds on which either spouse can seek divorce or judicial separation, including:

- Adultery
- Cruelty or inhumane treatment
- Desertion for at least two years
- Unsoundness of mind
- Conversion to another religion
- Mutual consent

=== 5. Special Divorce Provisions for Parsis ===
If a spouse does not cohabit for one year after being ordered to do so by the court, the other party can seek divorce. The Act emphasizes reconciliation efforts, requiring the court to make attempts to reunite the couple before finalizing divorce proceedings.

=== 6. Custody, Alimony, and Maintenance ===
The courts can award custody of children based on the child’s welfare and interests. Permanent alimony or financial support can be granted to either spouse based on their financial status and needs. The Act empowers the court to revise alimony orders if the circumstances of the parties change.

=== 7. Inheritance and Property Rights ===
Although the Act deals primarily with marriage and divorce, it intersects with Parsi personal laws governing inheritance and property, affecting the rights of spouses and children post-divorce or death.

== Jurisdiction and Enforcement ==
The Act establishes special Parsi matrimonial courts in various regions of India to handle cases under this legislation. These courts have the authority to adjudicate disputes related to marriage, divorce, and maintenance. Appeals from these courts can be made to the High Court.

== Criticism and Reforms ==
While the Act has been appreciated for preserving the customs and traditions of the Parsi community, it has also faced criticism for some outdated provisions. Advocates of reform have argued that the law needs further amendments to ensure greater gender neutrality and quicker resolutions of matrimonial disputes. It was also criticized by Supreme court of India for using jury trials, which has been outlawed in India since 1973.

== Application ==
This act is applicable to present day India, Pakistan and Bangladesh. As the successor states of British Indian Empire.

== See also ==
- Muslim personal law
- Zoroastrianism
- Hindu code bills
