= Inter-caste marriage =

Marriage between two individuals belonging to different castes

Intercaste marriage (ICM), also known as marrying out of caste, is a form of exogamous nuptial union that involve two individuals belonging to different castes. Intercaste marriages are particularly perceived as socially unacceptable and taboo in most parts of South Asia.

== By region ==
=== India ===
As of the 2011 census, only 5.8% of the marriages in India were inter-caste marriages. They are slightly more common in urban settings than in rural settings.

=== Nepal ===
Nepal has many castes and inter-caste marriage is generally considered taboo. However, this kind of marriage has been gradually gaining acceptance. In 1854, the Government of Nepal passed the "Muluki Ain" civil code commissioned by Jung Bahadur Rana. This law outlawed marriage between people of a lower caste with those of a higher caste. In 1963, King Mahendra modified the law to abolish the "caste-based unequal citizenship". Since then, inter-caste marriage has been gradually gaining acceptance throughout Nepal.

In 2009, the Government of Nepal announced that it would give a sum of रू100,000 Nepalese rupees (roughly US$1,350) away to couples who have an inter-caste marriage. The recipients would have to claim the sum within 30 days of the marriage. Republica, however, has reported that there was no "government assistance for Dalit women" who were left jilted by their upper-caste husbands.

=== Pakistan ===
Although “love marriages” not arranged by families may be allowed among the upper class Pakistanis, among other social classes intercaste marriages are socially not accepted. A 2011 study that examined Punjabi women reported that women in intercaste marriages are subjected to a greater risk of violence compared to other Pakistani women in general. Honor killings due to intercaste marriages have been extensively reported by Pakistani media agencies.

=== South Asian diaspora ===
Intercaste marriages in diaspora communities of people of South Asian descent, such as those in United Kingdom, are reported to be not prevalent. In 2011 an intercaste couple from UK claimed that their bosses had discriminated against them because of their relationship.

== Religious views ==
=== Islam ===
Islam does not prohibit marriages between individuals based on racial, ethnological, tribal, or caste grounds; though every marriage must still conform to Islamic marital laws that prohibit marriage of a Muslim woman to a non-Muslim man and of a Muslim man to polytheist woman.

=== Sikhism ===
Guru Amar Das was a proponent of inter-caste marriage, going against the social norms in Punjabi society at the time.

== See also ==
- Homogamy
- Hypergamy and hypogamy
