= Supriyo v. Union of India =

Ongoing Indian LGBT rights case law

- Court: Supreme Court of India
- Full case name: Supriyo a.k.a. Supriya Chakraborty & Abhay Dang v. Union of India thr. Its Secretary, Ministry of Law and Justice & other connected cases.
- Started: 25 November 2022
- Decided: 17 October 2023
- Citations: W.P.(C) No. 1011/2022 Diary No. 36593/2022 Copy of the judgment (2023 INSC 920)

Case history
- Prior actions: The Court transferred to itself nine ongoing cases from High Courts: one from Kerala and eight from Delhi.

Court membership
- Judges sitting: CJI D.Y. Chandrachud, J. S.K. Kaul, J. Ravindra Bhat, J. Hima Kohli & J. P.S. Narasimha

Case opinions
- The right to marry is a statutory right, not a constitutional right. Therefore, only Parliament can recognize the marriage between non-heterosexual couples. Transgender individuals in heterosexual relationships can marry under existing marriage laws, including all personal (religious) laws.
- Decision by: J. Ravindra Bhat, J. Hima Kohli & J. P.S. Narasimha
- Dissent: CJI D.Y. Chandrachud (in part), J. S.K. Kaul (in part)

Keywords
- Right to Family Life, Marriage Equality, Adoption Rights, Parenthood

Supriyo a.k.a. Supriya Chakraborty & Abhay Dang v. Union of India thr. Its Secretary, Ministry of Law and Justice & other connected cases, 2023 INSC 920 are a collection of landmark cases of the Supreme Court of India, which were filed to consider whether to extend right to marry and establish a family to sexual and gender minority individuals in India. A five-judge Constitution Bench, consisting of Chief Justice of India D.Y. Chandrachud, Justice S.K. Kaul, Justice S.R Bhat, Justice Hima Kohli and Justice P.S. Narasimha, heard 20 connected cases brought by 52 petitioners.

The petitioners, couples and individuals from sexual and gender minority communities, request recognition of the right to marry and establish a family based on protections from discrimination, the right to equality, dignity, personal liberty, privacy, and personal autonomy, and freedom of conscience and expression. Delhi Commission for Protection of Child Rights, a statutory body of the Aam Aadmi Party-led Delhi Government, intervened to support extending the right to marry and adopt for sexual and gender minority individuals.

The respondent, the Union Government under the Bharatiya Janata Party leadership and its statutory body National Commission for Protection of Child Rights, opposes extending the right to marry and establish a family to sexual and gender minority individuals in India, due to societal, cultural and religious history, consistent legislative policy, popular morality and majoritarian views. The State Governments of Assam, Gujarat and Madhya Pradesh led by the Bharatiya Janata Party, the State Government of Rajasthan led by the Indian National Congress, and the State Government of Andhra Pradesh led by the YSR Congress Party, intervened to oppose the right.

Hindu organizations like Shri Sanatam Dharm Pratinidhi Sabha and Akhil Bhartiya Sant Samiti, Islamic organizations like Jamiat Ulema-e-Hind and Telangana Markazi Shia Ulema Council, the women empowerment organization Bharatiya Stree Shakti, and the educational nonprofit organization Kanchan Foundation, intervened to oppose the right.

As the opponents raised concerns over the well-being of children in same-sex families, independent professional association, the Indian Psychiatric Society, supported marriage and adoption rights for sexual and gender minority individuals based on scientific evidence.

== Case summary ==
The petitioners, consisting of couples and individuals from sexual and gender minority communities, requested the Supreme Court to

- Recognise the marriage between any two persons, regardless of sexual orientation and gender identity, under the following marriage laws, by enforcing the fundamental rights guaranteed under Articles 14, 15, 19, 21 and 25 of the Indian Constitution:
  - Special Marriage Act of 1954
  - Hindu Marriage Act of 1955
  - Foreign Marriage Act of 1969
- Declare the notice and objection provisions of the Special Marriage Act and Foreign Marriage Act as void, by enforcing the fundamental rights guaranteed under Articles 14, 15, 19 and 21 of the Indian Constitution.
- Declare that a foreign-origin sexual and gender minority spouse of an Indian Citizen or Overseas Citizen of India is entitled to apply for registration as an Overseas Citizen of India under the Citizenship Act of 1955.
- Declare that a person can nominate anyone in the place of 'next of kin' under all relevant laws by enforcing the fundamental rights guaranteed under Articles 14, 15, 19 and 21 of the Indian Constitution.

The respondent, the Bharatiya Janata Party-led Union Government, opposed the request, including the extension of the right to marry and establish a family to sexual and gender minority individuals in India, arguing that

- Non-recognition of the rights of sexual and gender minority individuals to marry and establish a family does not violate the fundamental rights guaranteed under Articles 14, 15, 19, 21 and 25 of the Indian Constitution.
- Legitimate state interests are constitutionally permissible grounds for limiting the legal recognition of marriage following the Directive Principles of State Policy and the Fundamental Duties of the Indian Constitution.
- The Legislature reflects the collective wisdom of the nation, and it solely possesses the power to enact a law governing human relationships.
- As the Indian marriage laws do not recognise same-sex marriages, a foreign-origin sexual or gender minority spouse of an Indian Citizen or Overseas Citizen of India is entitled to apply for registration as an Overseas Citizen of India under the Citizenship Act of 1955.
- The challenge to notice and objection provisions of the Special Marriage Act and Foreign Marriage Act and adoption regulations unrelated to same-sex marriage. Therefore, the Supreme Court should exclude those matters from the current Case.

=== Intervenors ===
==== Government ====
The National Commission for Protection of Child Rights, a statutory body of the Bharatiya Janata Party-led Union Government, intervened in the Case opposing the extension of the right to adopt for sexual and gender minority individuals.

The State Governments of Assam, Gujarat and Madhya Pradesh led by the Bharatiya Janata Party, the State Government of Rajasthan led by the Indian National Congress, and the State Government of Andhra Pradesh led by the YSR Congress Party, intervened to oppose the right. The Delhi Commission for Protection of Child Rights, a statutory body of the Aam Aadmi Party-led Delhi Government, intervened to support extending the right to marry and adopt for sexual and gender minority individuals. The Commission recommended guidelines to ensure the well-being of children in same-sex adoptions.

==== Religious organisation ====
Hindu organisations Shri Sanatam Dharm Pratinidhi Sabha and Akhil Bhartiya Sant Samiti and Islamic organisation Jamiat Ulema-e-Hind and Telangana Markazi Shia Ulema Council intervened in the Case opposing the extension of the right to marry and establish a family to sexual and gender minority individuals in India on socio-legal and religious grounds.

== Background ==
A gay couple, Nikesh and Sonu, filed a petition seeking legal recognition of their marriage in the Kerala High Court on 24 January 2020. Kerala High Court Justice Anu Sivaraman admitted the petition on 27 January 2020. Four sexual and gender minority individuals, Abhijit Iyer Mitra, Gopi Shankar M, Giti Thadani and G. Oorvas, filed a petition seeking legal recognition of marriage in the Delhi High Court on 8 September 2020. A two-judge Bench of Delhi High Court, consisting of Chief Justice of Delhi High Court D.N. Patel and Justice Prateek Jalan, admitted the petition on 14 September 2020.

A gay couple, Supriya Chakraborty and Abhay Dang, filed a petition seeking legal recognition of their marriage in the Supreme Court of India on 14 November 2022. A two-judge Bench of the Supreme Court, consisting of Chief Justice of India D.Y. Chandrachud and Justice Hima Kohli, admitted the petition along with another gay couple, Parth Phiroze Mehrotra and Uday Raj Anand, on 25 November 2022.

The Supreme Court bench consisting of Chief Justice of India D.Y. Chandrachud and Justice P.S. Narasimha and Justice J.B. Pardiwala directed high courts to transfer nine similar petitions— eight from Delhi High Court and one from Kerala High Court— to the Supreme Court to consider alongside the original petitioners. On 15 March 2023, the Supreme Court admitted 20 connected petitions filed by 52 sexual and gender minority individuals, including 17 couples from sexual and gender minority communities.

Most of the petitioners wanted recognition of right to marry under secular marriage laws—the Special Marriage Act and the Foreign Marriage Act. As various news reports, case studies and official publications of the Law Commission documented unwarranted interferences in marriage due to the notice and objection provision of secular marriage laws and recommended its removal, most of the petitioners seeking recognition under secular marriage laws challenged the constitutionality of the notice and objection provisions.

Some of the petitioners are practising Hindus who believe that Hinduism does not prohibit marriage between sexual and gender minority individuals. They argued that excluding couples from sexual and gender minority communities from the Hindu Marriage Act amounted to a violation of their freedom to practice their religion.

Many advocates represented the petitioners, while Attorney General R. Venkataramani and Solicitor General Tushar Mehta represent the respondents. The Supreme Court appointed Advocate Arundhati Katju and Kanu Agrawal as the Nodal Counsel for the petitioners and respondents, respectively.

Cases connected to Supriyo v. Union of India
First Hearing		W.P.(C) No.	Petitioners	Respondents
Court	Date	W.P.(C) No.	Petitioners	Respondents
High Court of Kerala	27 Jan 2020	02186/2020	Nikesh P.P. & Sonu M.S.	Ministry of Law and Justice, Union of India
High Court of Kerala	27 Jan 2020	02186/2020	Nikesh P.P. & Sonu M.S.	Department of Law, State of Kerala
High Court of Kerala	27 Jan 2020	02186/2020	Nikesh P.P. & Sonu M.S.	Marriage Officer, Thrissur
High Court of Delhi	14 Sep 2020	06371/2020	Abhijit Iyer Mitra, Gopi Shankar M, Giti Thadani & G.Oorvasi	Ministry of Law and Justice, Union of India
High Court of Delhi	8 Oct 2020	07657/2020	Vaibhav Jain & Parag Vijay Mehta	Ministry of Law and Justice, Union of India
High Court of Delhi	8 Oct 2020	07657/2020	Vaibhav Jain & Parag Vijay Mehta	Marriage Officer, Consulate General, New York
High Court of Delhi	8 Oct 2020	07692/2020	Dr Kavita Arora & Ankita Khanna	Ministry of Law and Justice, Union of India
High Court of Delhi	8 Oct 2020	07692/2020	Dr Kavita Arora & Ankita Khanna	Marriage Officer, Delhi
High Court of Delhi	25 Feb 2021	02574/2021	Udit Sood, Saattvic, Lakshmi Manoharan & Gagandeep Paul	Ministry of Law and Justice, Union of India
High Court of Delhi	6 Jul 2021	06150/2021	Joydeep Sengupta, Russell Blaine Stephens & Mario Leslie Dpenha	Ministry of Home Affairs , Union of India
High Court of Delhi	6 Jul 2021	06150/2021	Joydeep Sengupta, Russell Blaine Stephens & Mario Leslie Dpenha	Ministry of External Affairs, Union of India
High Court of Delhi	6 Jul 2021	06150/2021	Joydeep Sengupta, Russell Blaine Stephens & Mario Leslie Dpenha	Marriage Officer, Consulate General, New York
High Court of Delhi	24 Nov 2021	13206/2021	Mellissa Ferrier & Kamakshi Raghavan	Ministry of Law and Justice, Union of India
High Court of Delhi	30 Nov 2021	13528/2021	Nibedita Dutta & Pooja Srivastava	Ministry of Law and Justice, Union of India
High Court of Delhi	30 Nov 2021	13535/2021	Zainab J. Patel	Ministry of Law and Justice, Union of India
High Court of Delhi	30 Nov 2021	13535/2021	Zainab J. Patel	National Legal Services Authority
Supreme Court of India	25 Nov 2022	01011/2022	Supriyo a.k.a. Supriya Chakraborty & Abhay Dang	Ministry of Law and Justice, Union of India
Supreme Court of India	25 Nov 2022	1020/2022	Parth Phiroze Mehrotra & Uday Raj Anand	Ministry of Law and Justice, Union of India
Supreme Court of India	6 Jan 2023	01105/2022	Sameer Samudra & Amit Gokhale	Ministry of Law and Justice, Union of India
Supreme Court of India	6 Jan 2023	01105/2022	Sameer Samudra & Amit Gokhale	Department of Law and Justice, State of Maharashtra
Supreme Court of India	6 Jan 2023	01105/2022	Sameer Samudra & Amit Gokhale	Marriage Registration Bureau, Pune
Supreme Court of India	6 Jan 2023	01141/2022	Aditi Anand & Susan Dias	Ministry of Law and Justice, Union of India
Supreme Court of India	6 Jan 2023	01142/2022	Utkarsh Saxena & Ananya Kotia	Ministry of Law and Justice, Union of India
Supreme Court of India	6 Jan 2023	01150/2022	Nitin Karani & Thomas Joseph	Ministry of Law and Justice, Union of India
Supreme Court of India	6 Jan 2023	01150/2022	Nitin Karani & Thomas Joseph	Department of Law and Justice, State of Maharashtra
Supreme Court of India	30 Jan 2023	00093/2023	Kajal & Bhawna	Ministry of Law and Justice, Union of India
Supreme Court of India	10 Feb 2023	00129/2023	Amburi Roy & Aparna Saha	Ministry of Law and Justice, Union of India
Supreme Court of India	10 Feb 2023	00129/2023	Amburi Roy & Aparna Saha	Ministry of External Affairs, Union of India
Supreme Court of India	10 Feb 2023	00129/2023	Amburi Roy & Aparna Saha	Central Adoption Resource Authority, Ministry of Women and Child Development, Union of India
Supreme Court of India	20 Feb 2023	00159/2023	Akkai Padmashali, Vyjayanti Vasanta Mogli & Umesh P a.k.a. Uma	Ministry of Law and Justice, Union of India
Supreme Court of India	3 Mar 2023	00260/2023	Rituparna Borah, Chayanika Shah, Minakshi Sanyal, Maya Sharma & Ors.	Ministry of Law and Justice, Union of India
Supreme Court of India	13 Mar 2023	00319/2023	Harish Iyer	Ministry of Law and Justice, Union of India

== Written arguments ==
This section summarises the written arguments submitted in the Court by the parties involved in the Case— the petitioners, respondent and intervenors.

=== Petitioners ===
==== Fundamental rights ====
Among the relevant precedents, issues and laws presented, the petitioners argued that the exclusion of couples from sexual and gender minority communities from marriage laws constituted a violation of fundamental right. Similarly, the notice and objection provisions in secular marriage laws— Special Marriage Act and Foreign Marriage Act— constituted a violation. Hence, following Article 32 of the Indian Constitution, which guarantees the Right to Constitutional Remedies and designates the Supreme Court as the protector of Fundamental Rights, the petitioners argued that they are within their rights to approach the Supreme Court.

===== Jurisdiction =====
In assessing whether a law infringes a fundamental right, the Supreme Court held that it is not the intention of the lawmaker that is determinative, but whether the effect or operation of the law infringes fundamental rights in the ruling of Maneka Gandhi v. UOI (1978). Since the marriage laws infringe on the fundamental rights of sexual and gender minority individuals, petitioners argued that the Supreme Court could act as the designated protector of fundamental rights.

The Supreme Court has regularly interpreted statutes in a manner which preserves their constitutionality, for example, in Travancore v. Mohammed Mohammed Khan (1981), Githa Hariharan v. Reserve Bank of India (1999) and Indra Das v. State of Assam (2011). Furthermore, the Supreme Court has held that when the enforcement of fundamental rights is concerned, the Supreme and High Courts do not have to await action by the legislature in Vishaka v. State of Rajasthan (1997), Vineet Narain v. UOI (1997), Shayara Bano v. UOI (2017), Common Cause v. UOI (2018) and Navtej Singh Johar v. UOI (2018).

===== Constitutional morality =====
The law, reflecting societal values, regulates relationships between people and prescribes behaviour patterns. As the social realities changes, the law changes. However, sometimes a legal change precedes societal changes and is even intended to stimulate. The Supreme Court, noting these dynamics when ruling in Badshah v. Urmila Badshah Godse (2014), held that the court should exercise discretion in determining the proper relationship between the subjective and objective purposes of the law.

The Supreme Court held that while the State can impose reasonable restrictions based on decency and morality, the limitations should be rational and tolerant of unpopular social views in S. Khushboo v. Kanniammal (2010) and Navtej Singh Johar v. UOI (2018). The Supreme Court stated the purpose of elevating certain rights to the stature of fundamental rights as to insulate their exercise from the disdain of majorities, whether legislative or popular, in Puttaswamy v. UOI (2017). The petitioners highlighted the instances where the Indian Courts protected fundamental rights by defying social and religious norms.— Mary Roy v. State of Kerala (1986), Githa Hariharan v. Reserve Bank of India (1999), Shayara Bano v. UOI (2017), Joseph Shine v. UOI (2018) and Arun Kumar v. Inspector General of Registration (2019).

===== Right to equality =====
Article 14 of the Indian Constitution guarantees the right to equality. The Supreme Court declared that any law that fails to protect the self-determination of sexual orientation and gender identity of an individual is irrational, manifestly arbitrary, and a violation of Article 14. The Supreme Court has recognised the principle of substantive equality in Lt. Col. Nitisha v. UOI (2021). The Supreme Court held that atypical families, such as domestic, unmarried partnerships or relationships between sexual and gender minority individuals, deserve equal protection under the law guaranteed in Article 14 in Deepika Singh v. Central Administrative Tribunal (2022).

===== Anti-discrimination =====
Article 15 of the Indian Constitution guarantees protection from discrimination. The Supreme Court extended the protection to include sexual orientation and gender identity. The Supreme Court has recognised the principle of substantive equality in Lt. Col. Nitisha v. UOI (2021). Considering the cultural stereotypes based on sex and gender and their role in discriminatory legislation, the Supreme Court held that judicial scrutiny to weave out discrimination must be strict in Anuj Garg v. Hotel Association of India (2007). The Supreme Court held that Article 15 places positive and negative obligations on the State in Navtej Singh Johar v. UOI (2018), where positive obligations call for the state to recognise rights which bring true fulfilment to same-sex relationships.

===== Freedom of expression =====
Article 19 of the Indian Constitution guarantees the right to freedom of speech and expression. The Supreme Court held that Article 19 includes full expression of sexual orientation and gender identity. The Supreme Court held that the choice of marital partner is an exercise of freedom of expression enshrined in Article 19 in Vikas Yadav v. State of Uttar Pradesh (2016), Asha Ranjan v. State of Bihar (2017), Shakti Vahini v. UOI (2018) and Shafin Jahan v Ashokan K.M. (2018).

===== Right to life and personal liberty =====
Article 21 of the Indian Constitution guarantees the right to life and personal liberty, which includes dignity, privacy, and personal autonomy. The Supreme Court recognised the rights guaranteed by Article 21 for sexual and gender minority individuals. The Supreme Court held that Article 21 recognises the right to choose a marital partner in the ruling of Shakti Vahini v. UOI (2018), Lata Singh v. State of Uttar Pradesh (2006), Puttaswamy v. UOI (2017), Shafin Jahan v Ashokan K.M. (2018), and Laxmibai Chandaragi B. v. State of Karnataka (2021).

===== Freedom of conscience and religion =====
Article 25 of the Indian Constitution guarantees freedom of conscience and religion. Since the Supreme Court ruled that the freedom of conscience of an individual is more than religious beliefs in Puttaswamy v. UOI (2017), the petitioners argued that the freedom to choose a marital partner is an integral component of freedom of conscience.

- Since the Supreme Court ruled that in addition to freedom of religion, Article 25 guarantees freedom from religion in Indian Young Lawyers Association v. State of Kerala (2019), the petitioners claiming recognition under the secular marriage laws argued the state should not endorse the conception of marriage that is exclusively heterosexual, as it is rooted in the norms of religion.
- Since Hinduism does not prohibit marriage between sexual and gender minority individuals, the petitioners claiming recognition under personal laws argued exclusion of couples from sexual and gender minority communities from the Hindu Marriage Act violates the petitioners' right to practice religion freely. The Madras High Court held that refusal to register the marriage between a Hindu cisgender man and a Hindu transgender woman under Hindu Marriage Act violates Article 25 in Arun Kumar v. Inspector General of Registration (2019).

===== Right to marry =====
Since the Supreme Court established the fundamental rights of sexual and gender minority individuals in NLSA v. UOI (2014), Puttaswamy v. UOI (2017) and Navtej Singh Johar v. UOI (2018), the petitioners argued for extending the right to marry and establish a family to sexual and gender minority individuals based on Articles 14, 15, 19, 21 and 25 of the Indian Constitution.

High Courts have considered the constitutionality of Indian marriage laws. The Madras High Court held that refusal to register the marriage between a Hindu cisgender man and a Hindu transgender woman under Hindu Marriage Act violates fundamental rights guaranteed under Articles 14, 15, 19, 21 and 25 of the Indian Constitution in Arun Kumar v. Inspector General of Registration (2019).

The petitioners requested that the Supreme Court declare that the gender change of a spouse would not automatically void solemnised marriage. As an extension of recognising the right to marry and establishing a family, the petitioners argued for the entitlement of a foreign-origin sexual or gender minority spouse of an Indian Citizen or Overseas Citizen of India to apply for registration as an Overseas Citizen of India.

==== Issues in secular marriage law ====
The notice and objections provisions detail the requirement for registering a marriage under the secular marriage laws— Special Marriage Act and Foreign Marriage Act. The individuals intending to marry must publish their details in Marriage Notice Book meant for public inspection. Within thirty days of publication, any person can object to their marriage, and a marriage officer, who has the power of a civil court, handles the objections.

===== Non-equality =====
The intention of the notice and objections provisions is to address the situations where individuals might hide the breach of prerequisites of marriage. However, such deterrents are absent in the personal laws governing marriage. Evidently, notice and objection provisions are not the only way to address the problem of a breach of prerequisites of marriage. The provisions are grossly disproportionate and violate the fundamental rights of the Indian Constitution. The provisions violates Article 14 of the Indian Constitution by creating an unequal burden on individuals who choose to marry under secular marriage laws. It violates Article 15 of the Indian Constitution by discriminating those constrained to marry under secular marriage laws from those who marry under personal laws.

===== Violations of freedom of expression =====
The provisions violate the freedom of expression guaranteed by Article 19 by enabling continuing harassment and persecution. Multiple news reports document the role of the provision in enabling continuing harassment and persecution. The 2010 Indian case studies documented the barrier posed by these procedural requirements of the secular marriage laws. The Law Commission published a consultation paper on the Reform of Family Law that recognised the notice and objection provision of secular marriage laws as an impediment to personal autonomy. The Law Commission published a report on the Prevention of Interference with the freedom of Matrimonial Alliances that recommended the removal of the notice and objection provisions of the secular marriage laws to prevent "high-handed or unwarranted interference" in marriages.

===== Violations of decisional autonomy =====
The provisions violate the decisional autonomy guaranteed by Article 21 by authorising any person to object to the marriage. The Law Commission published a consultation paper on the Reform of Family Law that recognised the provisions as an impediment to personal autonomy protected by Article 21. The provisions force individuals to surrender their right to privacy to exercise their right to marry. The Supreme Court held that a requirement that forces the individual to give up one constitutional right to exercise another is unconstitutional in the ruling of Ahmedabad St. Xavier's College Society v. State of Gujarat (1974).

High Courts have considered the constitutionality of the provisions. Remarking that unwarranted disclosure of the marriage plans might jeopardise the marriage and endanger the lives of the couple, the Delhi High Court deprecated the practice of sending notices to residential addresses in the ruling of Pranav Kumar Mishra v. Govt. of NCT of Delhi (2009). Relying on the right to personal liberty and privacy, Allahabad High Court read down the notice and objection provision of the Special Marriage Act as a directory and not mandatory in the ruling of Safiya Sultana v. State of Uttar Pradesh (2021).

==== Representative and heirs ====
Despite the landmark decision of the Supreme Court asserting the right to self-determination of sexual orientation and gender identity in NLSA v. UOI (2014), Puttaswamy v. UOI (2017) and Navtej Singh Johar v. UOI (2018), the birth or adoptive family continues to interfere and restrict the self-determination. As the vast majority of Indian laws define 'family' to be persons related by marriage, birth or adoption, the petitioners have presented a compelling case for legal recognition of their marital relationships to formalise access to rights and obligations. However, many others do not share the aspiration for married life, and the law cannot ignore them. They may choose friends, domestic partners and other persons of vital importance to assign rights and obligations.

While the conflict with the birth or adoptive family may have given rise to the idea of chosen family, it does not challenges birth or adoptive family bonds but allows for a more inclusive understanding of adult relationships. Most sexual and gender minority individuals, informed by their lived experience of family rejection, hostility and violence, require a legal substitute for the family for healthcare, social and economic rights and obligations. Recognising any person as capable of serving the best interests of an individual in a state of vulnerability or incapacitation, the Mental Healthcare Act of 2017 authorised an individual to appoint any person as the nominated representative. Legal limiting next of kin to persons related by marriage, birth or adoption violates the decisional autonomy of sexual and gender minority individuals.

The Supreme Court has recognised the principle of substantive equality, which prohibits the State from expecting conformity as a price for equality in Lt. Col. Nitisha v. UOI (2021). The Supreme Court held that married and unmarried persons have equal decisional autonomy to make decisions about their welfare in X v. Principal Secretary, Health and Family Welfare Department, Govt. of NCT of Delhi (2022). The Supreme Court held that atypical families deserve equal protection under the law guaranteed in Article 14 in Deepika Singh v. Central Administrative Tribunal (2022). Relying on these precedents, the petitioners argued that unmarried sexual and gender minority individuals deserve recognition and protection of the law when they seek to nominate any person beyond the constraints of biological or adoptive families.

High Courts have expanded the scope of legal heirs for intersex, non-binary and transgender people in Illyas v. Badshah alias Kamla (1990) and Sweety v. General Public (2016). The petitioners request the Supreme Court to declare that a person can nominate anyone in the place of 'next of kin' under all relevant laws.

==== International treaties ====
India is a party to various international treaties concerning human rights. India voted to adopt the Universal Declaration of Human Rights (UDHR) in United Nations General Assembly on 10 December 1948, and the same is enforceable in India under the Protection of Human Rights Act of 1993. India ratified the International Convention of Civil and Political Rights (ICCPR) and the International Covenant on Economic, Social and Cultural Rights (ICESCR) on 10 April 1979. Over the last three decades, International human rights law has developed an established jurisprudence on the rights to equality, privacy and autonomy of sexual and gender minority individuals and protection from discrimination based on sexual orientation and gender identity.

Since the Supreme Court enforced the international treaties discussed above while ruling in the NLSA v. UOI (2014) and Navtej Singh Johar v. UOI (2018), the petitioners argued extending the right to marry and establish a family to sexual and gender minority individuals based on the following articles:

- Article 7 of the UDHR, Article 26 of ICCPR and Article 2 of ICESCR prohibit discrimination based on 'sex... or other status.' The UN Human Rights Committee stated that the 'other status' includes sexual orientation. The UN Committee on Economic, Social and Cultural Rights urged the member states to ensure that a person's sexual orientation is not a barrier to realising Covenant Rights.
- Article 16 of the UDHR, Article 23 of the ICCPR and Article 10 of ICESCR guarantee the right to marry and establish a family. Travaux préparatoires shows that drafters of UDHR changed the language in the right to marry from 'everyone' to the specific 'men and women' to highlight that women have the right to marry. The drafters did not intend to exclude same-sex couples from marriage. The UN Human Rights Committee urged member states to recognise marriage for same-sex couples to fulfil their ICCPR obligations.
- Article 12 of the UDHR and Article 17 of the ICCPR prohibit arbitrary interference with their privacy, family, home or correspondence.

==== Soft Law ====
The Supreme Court held that Yogyakarta Principles on the Application of Human Rights Law in Relation to Sexual Orientation and Gender Identity (2007) is consistent with various fundamental rights enshrined in the Indian Constitution and stated that they must be recognised and followed in the decision of NLSA v. UOI (2014) and Navtej Singh Johar v. UOI (2018). The petitioners pointed to:

- Principle 24 of the Yogyakarta Principles, which recognises the right to establish a family, regardless of sexual orientation and gender identity. It calls for the State to recognise same-sex marriage or registered partnership and ensure that same-sex married or registered partners have the entitlements, privileges, obligations and benefits available to opposite-sex married or registered partners.

==== Obergefell v. Hodges (United States, 2015) ====
In anticipation of an oppositional argument that could emphasise marriage as traditionally and historically being limited to opposite-sex couples, the petitioners argue that generations of denial are not an argument for its perpetuation. They point to the majority opinion of Obergefell v. Hodges (2015), in which Associate Justice Kennedy wrote that if rights were defined by who exercised them in the past, then past practices would serve as continued justification for denying the new groups the rights.

In anticipation of an opposition prophesy that upholding everybody's fundamental right to marry would diminish the worth of opposite-sex marriages, petitioners point to the conclusion of the majority on the same discussion in Obergefell v. Hodges (2015), "it is wholly illogical to believe that state recognition of the love and commitment between same-sex couples will alter the most intimate and personal decisions of opposite-sex couples."

While deciding the Sunil Batra v. Delhi Administration (1978), the Supreme Court held that the despite the lack of the Due Process Clause in the Constitution of India same consequence ensued after the decisions in R.C. Cooper v. Union of India (1970) and Maneka Gandhi v. Union of India (1978). Affirming the verdict of Sunil Batra v. Delhi Administration (1978), the Supreme Court held that substantive due process is applied to the fundamental right to life and liberty in Mohd Arif v. The Registrar (2014).

Finally, the Supreme Court held that Article 14 of the Indian Constitution corresponds to the Equal Protection Clause of the Fourteenth Amendment of the United States Constitution in Chiranjit Lal Chowdhuri v. UOI (1950). Hence, the United States Supreme Court ruling in Obergefell v. Hodges (2015), which held the fundamental right to marry is guaranteed to same-sex couples by both the Due Process Clause and the Equal Protection Clause of the Fourteenth Amendment of the Constitution is relevant to the current case.

==== Recognition of foreign marriage ====
The Supreme Court recognised the principles of comity of nations in the ruling of Mirza Ali Akbar Kashani v. United Arab Republic (1966), Tractor Export v. Tarapore & Co. (1969) and Gramophone Company of India Ltd. v. Birendra Bahadur Pandey (1984). The petitioners called attention to the fact that 32 countries have recognised same-sex marriage. Since Foreign Marriage Act has extraterritorial operations, petitioners argued that it should be read to conform with international developments.

==== Citizenship of sexual and gender minority spouse ====
The petitioners argue that the Citizenship Act does not authorise the officials to examine the marriage under Indian law. Therefore, as long as the marriage is validly registered overseas and the sexual or gender minority spouse of foreign origin satisfies other conditions, they are entitled to apply for OCI. They point to the ruling of the Israeli High Court of Justice that registration officials, who are not competent to examine the validity of the marriage under Israeli law, should register the same-sex marriage of Israeli Citizens performed validly overseas in Ben-Ari v. Director of Population Administration (2006).

==== Legislative policy ====
The petitioners highlighted various entitlements, privileges, obligations and benefits limited to marital, blood or adoptive relationships. These legal provisions exclude legally unrecognised spouses and families of sexual and gender minority individuals.

===== Healthcare =====
When a patient cannot communicate their wishes due to being in a persistent vegetative state, having a form of dementia or similar illness, or being under anaesthesia, legally unrecognised spouses and families of sexual and gender minority individuals are not allowed to make healthcare decisions for them.

Legally unrecognised spouses and families of sexual and gender minority individuals face discrimination in organ donation in the case of both living or deceased partners. Under the Transplantation of Human Organs and Tissues Act of 1994, the declaration to donate organs requires the presence of at least one marital, blood or adoptive relative. As a result, unrecognised spouses and families cannot make these vital decisions about sexual and gender minority family members. Sexual and gender minority partners need prior approval of the Authorisation Committee under the Transplantation of Human Organs and Tissues Act. The Committee evaluates the proof of affection or attachment to the intended recipient of the organ before permitting organ donation, which legally married couples need not provide.

===== Finance =====
Sexual and gender minority family members lack the rights around succession, maintenance, joint ownership of assets, taxation and benefits. As private entitlements exclude sexual and gender minority family members, sexual and gender minority individuals face more barriers and higher scrutiny in privately offered life insurance nominations, owning joint bank accounts and lockers, and mutual funds and savings plans.

According to the Income Tax Act of 1961, the payments made on behalf of a spouse are included in the deduction when computing the total income. These deductions include the payments made towards life insurance, a deferred annuity of the life of a spouse, the spouse's provident fund set up by the Central Government and the spouse for participation in the Unit-linked Insurance Plan. Sexual and gender minority family members cannot claim such deductions. According to the Supreme Court ruling on Rajesh v. Rajbir Singh, the spousal consortium considered in the claims, including the claims for injury and death in the Motor Vehicle Act of 1988 cases, is only available to married couples. Hence the legally unrecognised spouses of sexual and gender minority individuals are denied such claims.

===== Employment =====
Without recognition of the right to marry, couples from sexual and gender minority communities cannot access the benefits available to opposite-sex couples through various legislation. Couples from sexual and gender minority communities in government service cannot request same-city postings. A sexual and gender minority partner cannot receive the healthcare coverage provided to the spouse of government employees.

The government grants an appointment on compassionate grounds to a dependent family member of a government servant dying or retired on medical grounds and leaving their family without any livelihood. Couples from sexual and gender minority communities are not eligible for compassionate appointments or family pensions.

Under the current reading of the Indian Acts, sexual and gender minority employee cannot nominate their legally unrecognised family for benefits and entitlements as long as their biological or adoptive family members are alive. Some of the Acts highlighted by the petitioners are:

- Employee's Compensation Act of 1923,
- Employees' Provident Funds Act of 1952,
- Payment of Gratuity Act of 1972,
- Payment of Wages Act, 1936 and
- Unorganised Workers' Social Security Act of 2008.

Since private entitlements, such as healthcare and other spousal benefits extended in private employment, exclude sexual and gender minority family members, sexual and gender minority individuals face more barriers and higher scrutiny in acquiring spousal benefits.

===== Housing =====
Couples from sexual and gender minority communities do not have the right to reside in a shared household. Hence, sexual and gender minority individuals cannot rely on their partner's rented or owned home to prove residence for official purposes.

===== Parenthood =====
Without recognition of the right to marry, couples from sexual and gender minority communities cannot have children through adoption, surrogacy, or assisted reproductive technologies.

The Juvenile Justice Act of 2015, along with relevant rules, does not allow unmarried couples and couples in a live-in relationship to adopt children as a couple. The Adoption Regulations of 2022 state that a child cannot be given in adoption to a couple unless they have at least two years of a stable marital relationship. In line with the Adoption Regulations, the Central Adoption Resource Authority has decided that single prospective adoptive parents, who are in a live-in relationship with a partner, will not be considered eligible to adopt a child.

The Surrogacy (Regulation) Act of 2021 allows only married couples to have children through surrogacy. The Assisted Reproductive Technology (Regulation) Act of 2021 allows only infertile married couples to obtain the services of an authorised clinic or bank for assisted reproductive technologies.

Since the parents cannot get married, the child has no legal relationship with an unrelated parent. As a result, various entitlements, privileges, obligations and benefits are unavailable to the unrelated parent and the child. An unrelated parent cannot make medical decisions in the case of an emergency.

===== Judicial proceedings =====
The Indian Evidence Act of 1872 provides spousal privilege, that is, immunity from being compelled to disclose any communication between spouses during their marriage. Additionally, they cannot disclose any communication without their partner or partner's representative's consent. Couples from sexual and gender minority communities do not have this crucial protection privilege under Indian evidentiary law.

The Protection of Women from Domestic Violence Act of 2005 protects women in an opposite-sex marital or live-in relationship. The law extends its protection to women living in a household, such as sisters or mothers, but fails to protect sexual and gender minority women in a relationship.

==== Entry and residence permits ====
A spouse of foreign origin of an Indian Citizen or OCI is entitled to apply for registration as an OCI under the Citizenship Act. OCI is a form of permanent residency which allows cardholders to live and work in India indefinitely. Without recognition of the right to marry, a foreign-origin sexual or gender minority spouse is not eligible for OCI Card.

Recognition of the right to marry for sexual and gender minority individuals is crucial for acquiring a visa and residency. Sexual and gender minority families cannot declare the name of their spouse or parent on their passports. Similarly, OCI cardholders are subject to the notification issued by the Union Government— for example, during the COVID-19 pandemic, the Union Government allowed OCI cardholders with Indian parents or spouses alone to enter the country.

==== Social exclusion and violence ====
Legally sanctioned exclusion, such as the prohibition of marriage between sexual and gender minority individuals, constitutes a form of structural discrimination which reinforces ignorance and prejudice and leads to widespread discrimination, rejection and violence against sexual and gender minority individuals in India. The petitioners demonstrate widespread discrimination, rejection and violence against sexual and gender minority individuals in India by reporting relevant peer-reviewed studies and news articles.

Family honour culture is one of the reasons for the harassment of sexual and gender minority individuals in India. A 2021 multinational study documented the attitudes towards violence against sexual and gender minority individuals in five countries: India, Pakistan, Malaysia, Iran and England. Indians ranked second, following Pakistanis, for their belief that gay men had damaged their family honour and their acceptance of verbal abuse and life-threatening violence by the family towards gay men.

Familial harassment takes various forms of violence and violations. A 2016 Indian study reported the family as the primary source of psychological, physical and sexual violence against sexual and gender minority individuals that normalises such violence for sexual and gender minority individuals in India. 2011 Indian qualitative study documented the endemic and pervasive nature of violence faced by sexual and gender minority women, such as psychological and verbal abuse, bodily harm, forced marriage, wrongful confinement, medical abuse and corrective rape. Familial harassment and rejection are common reasons for homelessness and suicide among sexual and gender minority individuals in India. India lacks comprehensive statistics on suicide among sexual and gender minority individuals in India. A 2011 Mumbai-based study of men who have sex with men found 45 per cent to be suicidal, with 15 per cent categorised as high risk. A 2016 Indian study estimated the suicide rate among transgender Indians as 31 per cent, and at least 50 per cent of them have attempted suicide at least once before their 20th birthday.

Couples from sexual and gender minority communities face familial harassment in the form of forced separation and wrongful detention or reporting their partners of kidnapping. If the couple were separated and detained by the parents, the partner has to approach a High Court for a writ petition for habeas corpus. The Courts frequently question the locus standi of the individual due to the non-recognition of their relationship. On the other hand, if the parents had reported the kidnapping, the police ascertained if the partner had left on their own accord. However, the seemingly straightforward procedure of recording the individual's statement to determine whether they are acting out of their free will gets complicated due to societal prejudice validated by the lack of the right to marry for sexual and gender minority individuals in India.

Reports have documented instances where lesbian couples have considered, attempted or committed suicide together. A lesbian couple, Asha Thakor and Bhavna Thakor, facing opposition from their family in rural Gujarat, committed suicide shortly after eloping to the city. The couple had eloped to find a safe space and acceptance but never found it. Similarly, a gay couple from rural Assam, Ankur Das and Brajen Thakuria committed suicide after their families firmly opposed their relationship and blamed them for one of their mother's early death. Despite the existence of suicide notes and social media posts, most of the cases end with first information reports and news articles, without any investigations and persecution of those abetting suicide.

===== Housing, education and employment =====
In the larger society, sexual and gender minority individuals in India face prejudice in housing, education and employment. Sexual and gender minority individuals in India encounter discrimination from property owners and landlords, leading to a denial of housing and forced evictions. A 2018 UNESCO-supported Indian study found that 60% of middle school students (ISCED Level 2), 60% of high school students (ISCED Level 3) and 50% of higher secondary school students (ISCED Level 3) were victims of physical violence due to sexual orientation and gender identity. As a result of the harassment, the students reported they had reduced social interaction with their peers (73%), suffered from anxiety and depression (70%), and discontinued school (33.2%). Prejudice in the workplace manifests as harassment and discrimination in the recruitment process and promotions.

===== Effects of repression =====
The fear of familial harassment and rejection causes sexual and gender minority individuals in India to conceal their identity and remain in the closet. However, this does not guarantee their safety. According to a 2015 Indian survey, the majority of gay men who experienced physical violence (52.4%), sexual abuse (55%) and psychological abuse (46.5%) lived with their parents and were most often closeted. In contrast, gay men who lived with their partners or sexual and gender minority individuals faced little abuse. Closeted gay men living with parents cannot freely seek peer support from other sexual and gender minority individuals when faced with violence. Subsequently, most sexual and gender minority individuals in India grow old facing life without lawful companionship and confronting the reality of loneliness, which research shows carry a risk comparable to if not exceeds, that of other well-accepted factors, including smoking up to 15 cigarettes a day, obesity, physical inactivity and air pollution.

===== Social assimilation through inclusive policies =====
In light of widespread discrimination, rejection and violence against sexual and gender minority individuals in India, the petitioners argued the sexual and gender minority-inclusive policies — for relationships, parenthood, healthcare, education and employment — provides opportunities to assimilate into society To make their case, the petitioners highlighted the historical role of Indian statutory reforms, such as the abolishment of Sati and recognition of inter-caste marriage and widow remarriage, in aiding the social assimilation of marginalised Indians. The petitioners highlighted the instances where the Indian Courts got rid of various socially regressive practices in defiance of social and religious norms— Mary Roy v. State of Kerala (1986), Githa Hariharan v. Reserve Bank of India (1999), Shayara Bano v. UOI (2017), Joseph Shine v. UOI (2018) and Arun Kumar v. Inspector General of Registration (2019).

Scholars reason that the legal recognition of marriage between sexual and gender minority individuals is often accompanied by media attention and increased visibility, which is associated with increased social support for sexual and gender minority individuals. The increased social support could translate into improved familial and peer acceptance, which is associated with improved mental health. A 2017 U.S. study found sexual and gender minority teens' suicide attempts declined in U.S. states that enacted laws recognising same-sex marriage. The study also reported the effect of legal recognition of same-sex marriage persisted two years after recognition, disproving the argument that legal recognition of same-sex marriage would negatively affect sexual and gender minority individuals due to social and political backlash. More directly, the legal recognition of the right to marry would extend the previously discussed benefits, entitlements, privileges and obligations to couples from sexual and gender minority communities and improve their quality of life.

==== Economic cost of social exclusion ====
The petitioners argued that the structural discrimination against sexual and gender minority individuals in India, such as the prohibition of marriage between sexual and gender minority individuals, hurts economic output— an unnecessary cost to all Indian citizens. Cross-country studies have estimated that the legal provision of same-sex marriage is associated with a long-term increase in GDP per capita of 54 to 64 per cent.

Discrimination in the workplace leads to underutilisation of human capital if a less skilled worker from favoured groups is hired or promoted instead of a skilled sexual and gender minority worker. If the skilled sexual and gender minority workers cannot find a suitable option, then the unutilised or underutilised skilled sexual and gender minority workers constitute a loss to economic output.

In addition to discrimination, the harassment of sexual and gender minority workers can reduce their productivity, even if their wages and employment are not directly affected. A 2016 study found that 40 per cent of sexual and gender minority workers experienced harassment by their peers, and 66 per cent heard negative comments about sexual and gender minorities. A 2019 study found that sexual and gender minority workers are 10 per cent less productive in the same job as the general population, leading to a loss of 0.4 per cent of GDP annually.

Several studies found a positive association between sexual and gender minority-inclusive policies and financial measures like stock prices, asset returns, per-worker output and employee innovation. It is not a coincidence that 91 per cent of Fortune 500 companies included sexual orientation in their non-discrimination policies in 2019.

===== Emigration =====
When denied equal rights, sexual and gender minority individuals who can migrate, often highly educated or financially resourceful individuals, migrate to countries that afford better protection. Sexual Migration— migration where sexual orientation is an influential factor— is a well-documented and widespread phenomenon. Studies focusing on Indian migrants have documented the lack of sexual and gender minority rights in India as a motivating factor for the decision. Due to the lack of Indian studies on sexual migration, the petitioners pointed to the Hong Kong study, which reported that 52.5 per cent considered leaving because of their sexual orientation, of whom 91.3 per cent cited the lack of legal recognition of marriage between sexual and gender minority individuals as a reason.

===== Foreign revenue =====
Research shows a positive correlation between acceptance of homosexuality and foreign investments. When comparing cities, there is a positive association between homosexual residents, foreign-born residents and the number of successful businesses. Additionally, sexual and gender minority tourism was worth 211 billion dollars in 2016. Sexual and gender minority travellers tend to spend more than cisgendered heterosexual travellers, but they are unlikely to choose destinations which lack adequate protections for sexual and gender minority individuals.

===== Health disparity =====
The studies show the stigma and social exclusion experienced by sexual and gender minority individuals in India lead to higher incidences of physical and mental health problems among sexual and gender minority individuals in India compared to the general population drastically reducing their ability to engage in productive work and contribute to overall economic activity. Canadian and US studies on the cost of stigma and social exclusion have used data on depression, suicide, smoking, alcohol abuse, substance abuse, HIV, hospitalisation, lost days of work, and early mortality. Since India lacks such comprehensive data on the health disparity of sexual and gender minority individuals in India, the 2014 World Bank study considered only depression, suicide and HIV among sexual and gender minority individuals in India. The study estimates stigma and social exclusion of sexual and gender minority individuals in India cost India up to 1.3 per cent of its GDP annually.

Researchers' preferred explanation for the higher incidences of mental health problems among sexual and gender minority individuals is that stigma, prejudice, and discrimination create a stressful social environment that can lead to these problems. Rates of depression among sexual and gender minority individuals in India are 6 to 12 times higher than the general population. A Mumbai-based study of men who have sex with men found 45 per cent to be suicidal, with 15 per cent categorised as high risk. This range of suicidal ideation among sexual and gender minority individuals in India is 7 to 14 times the suicidal ideation among the general population from developing countries, including India.

Social exclusion might make healthcare services less relevant or accessible to sexual and gender minority individuals in India. A study found that prejudice in society, specifically among healthcare providers, and experiencing negative consequences when disclosing their identity was associated with lower access to HIV preventive measures among sexual and gender minority individuals.

=== Respondent ===
On 12 March 2023, the Union Government under the leadership of the Bharatiya Janata Party filed a counter-affidavit in the Supreme Court, opposing extending the right to marry to sexual and gender minority individuals in India. The Union Government argued that the challenge to notice and objection provisions of the Special Marriage Act and Foreign Marriage Act and adoption regulations unrelated to same-sex marriage. Therefore, the Supreme Court should exclude those matters from the current Case. This section contains a summary of relevant precedents, issues and laws submitted.

==== Fundamental rights ====
The Union Government argued that denying the right to marry for sexual and gender minority individuals in India does not violate the fundamental rights guaranteed under Articles 14, 15, 19, 21 and 25 of the Indian Constitution. To make their case, they point to the Supreme Court ruling in Navtej Singh Johar v. UOI (2018) that explicitly differentiated and excluded marital relationships while reading down Section 377 of the Indian Penal Code for violating fundamental rights. They argue that the Supreme Court decriminalised homosexual conduct but did not legitimise it.

Normativity is an intelligible differentia which distinguishes opposite-sex couples from couples from sexual and gender minority communities. The rationale for this classification is to ensure social stability through legal recognition of marriage. Hence the non-recognition of marriage between sexual and gender minority individuals does not violate Article 14 of the Indian Constitution, which guarantees equality before the law or equal protection of the laws within the territory of India.

Opposite-sex couples living together do not enjoy the same status as opposite-sex married couples. The Supreme Court held the presumption of the marriage of couples living together is rebuttable in Badri Prasad v. Director of Consolidation(1978). Not every form of opposite-sex relationship is on par with opposite-sex marriage. Since the non-recognition of marriage between sexual and gender minority individuals is not discrimination only based on sex, it does not violate Article 15 of the Indian Constitution.

While all citizens have a right to an association under Article 19 of the Indian Constitution, the State is not obligated to recognise such associations. The State limits the legal recognition of marriage to opposite-sex couples. While the State does not recognise various forms of marriages, unions or relationships between individuals in society, they are not unlawful either.

===== Right to life and personal liberty =====
The Union Government argued against any interpretation of Article 21 of the Indian Constitution to include any implicit approval of the right to marry for sexual and gender minority individuals. They point to the Supreme Court decision that explicitly differentiated and excluded marital relationships while reading down Section 377 of the Indian Penal Code for violating Article 21 in Navtej Singh Johar v. UOI (2018).

Since the fundamental rights guaranteed by Article 21 are subject to the procedure established by the law, and the Indian marriage laws explicitly limit the recognition to opposite-sex couples, the Supreme Court cannot extend the right to marry to include couples from sexual and gender minority communities. The Supreme Court held that Article 21 provides the right to marry a person of choice but also included that the law may regulate the conditions of a valid marriage in Shafin Jehan vs Asokan K.M (2018).

Marriage is between two individuals with a profound impact on their personal lives, causing petitioners to seek recognition of marriage under the right to privacy, which is intrinsic to Article 21 of the Indian Constitution. However, when considering legal recognition of their marriage and ancillary rights, the State cannot relegate marriage as a concept within the private domain. The legal recognition of marriage is a public recognition of their relationship.

Even if the petitioners can claim the right to marry under Article 21, the legislature can curtail the rights on constitutionally permissible grounds such as legitimate State interest.

===== Right to freedom of conscience and religion =====
Article 25 of the Indian Constitution protects personal laws. The Supreme Court reaffirmed the constitutional protection of personal laws when ruling in Shayara Bano v. UOI (2017).

==== Constitutional exception to fundamental rights ====
The Union Government pointed to the Supreme Court ruling that reading fundamental rights is not to be done in isolation but along with the Directive Principles of State Policy and the Fundamental Duties in Javed v. State of Haryana (2003). They argue that the principles of legitimate state interests as an exception to fundamental rights would be applicable in the current case.

===== Legitimate state interests =====
The Union Government argued that a larger legislative framework around the legislative understanding of marriage between opposite sexes demonstrates the legitimate state interest in limiting legal recognition of marriage. The legal recognition of marriage limited to opposite-sex couples is the norm throughout history and foundational to both the existence and continuance of the State.

Considering the historical and religious norms and social value of marriage, Union Government argued that the State has a legitimate interest in limiting legal recognition of marriage to opposite-sex couples. While deciding on Ram Shiv Kumar v. State of Haryana (1981) and Dalmia Cement (Bharat) Ltd. v. UOI (1996), the Supreme Court held that considerations of social morals are relevant in the process of legislating and legislature can judge and enforce such societal morality and public acceptance. The Supreme Court held that the right to privacy is not absolute and is subject to lawful actions to prevent crime and disorder or protect the rights and freedom of others, health or morals in the Mr 'X' v. Hospital 'Z' (1998). Similarly, the Supreme Court held that the freedom guaranteed by Article 301 of the Indian Constitution is not available to the liquor trade because liquor is a harmful substance detrimental to public health, order and morality.

====== Historical and religious norms ======
Codified statutory or uncodified personal laws evolved based on societal values and beliefs, cultural history and religious beliefs. The concept of marriage is a concept emanating from the personal laws of citizens. In Hinduism, marriage is a sacrament for reciprocal duties between a cis man and cis woman. In Islam, marriage is a contract between a cis man and cis woman. With the evolution of jurisprudence, the legislature codified some aspects of marriage. The legal recognition of opposite-sex marriage is to give the relationship a formal character and ensure that all statutory provisions governing the relationships, rights, liabilities, privileges and consequences are available. Despite the statutory recognition of marriage, it relies on historical customs, rituals and practices.

====== Social values ======
Marriage is a social institution that provides security, support and companionship. Marriage has social and moral obligations in addition to legal obligations and plays a significant role in child-rearing. Same-sex individuals living together and having sexual relationships, which the Supreme Court decriminalised, cannot be compared with the Indian family unit. Indian family unit, which consists of a cis man and cis woman as a husband and wife, and the children born to them, is a quintessential building block for the existence and continuance of the society.

==== International and comparative law ====
Given the context of the current case, the Union Government argued that Western decisions, without any basis in Indian Constitutional law jurisprudence, cannot be imported. The Supreme Court rejected the US decision that relied on the due process clause of the Constitution of the United States, which was absent in the Indian Constitution as it relied upon the tests of reasonableness in the ruling of Collector of Customs, Madras v. Nathella Sampathu Chetty (1962) and Santokh Singh v. Delhi Administration (1973).

==== Legislative policy ====
The acceptance of marriage between two individuals of the same gender is neither recognised nor accepted by any uncodified personal or codified statutory laws, such as the Christian Marriage Act of 1872, the Parsi Marriage and Divorce Act of 1936, the Special Marriage Act, the Hindu Marriage Act and the Foreign Marriage Act. Through specific references to opposite sexes, the legislative intent to limit the legal recognition of marriage to opposite-sex couples is clear. The Supreme Court affirmed that marriage is a legal union of a man and a woman in the ruling of Mr 'X' v. Hospital 'Z' (1998) and Reema Aggarwal v. Anupam (2004).

Extension of the right to marry to sexual and gender minority individuals would make laws governing marriage, ancillary rights and special provisions for married women otiose. The Supreme Court ruled that the 'relationship in the nature of marriage' specified in the Protection of Women from Domestic Violence Act does not include same-sex relationships in Indra Sarma v. V.K.V. Sarma (2013). The Union Government presented a list of legislations that will be affected if the Supreme Court extend the right to marry to sexual and gender minority individuals, demonstrating the consistent legislative policy that limits marriage to opposite-sex couples and the incompatibility between the right and the current Legislative Policy.

The above list demonstrates the clear legislative intent to limit the legal recognition of marriage to opposite-sex couples. The Supreme Court held that Judiciary is bound to the literal interpretation when the words of a statute are clear and unambiguous in the ruling of the Raghunath Rai Bareja v. Punjab National Bank (2007). While ruling in Subramanian Swamy v. Raju (2014), the Supreme Court held that the Judiciary could read down only when the reading of the provision produces an absurd or unworkable result and reads down a law to give effect to its legislative intent. It is not permissible for the Judiciary to change the entire legislative policy of the country deeply embedded in religious, societal, cultural and legal norms.

Recognising marriage and conferring ancillary rights, which have consequences in law and privileges, is a legislative function. The legislature would have to consider and deliberate on the right to adopt and other rights that would naturally follow the recognition of the right to marry for sexual and gender minority individuals. Only a legislature, which reflects the collective wisdom of the nation, can enact legislation based on societal values, beliefs and acceptability, and cultural history to govern, regulate, permit or prohibit human relationships, including issues such as marriage, adoption, divorce, and maintenance.

Regarding sexual or gender minority spouses, the respondent argued that the legislative intent of the Citizenship Act is to provide a mechanism for foreign citizens married to Indian Citizens or Overseas Citizens of India to obtain Overseas Citizens of India. It was never intended to recognise same-sex marriage. The Supreme Court held that Parliament is presumed to know the law of the land when it is legislating in Bhagwati Steel Rolling Mills v. CCE (2016). When the Parliament enacted the Citizenship Act, it was aware of laws limiting legal recognition of marriage to opposite-sex couples. Therefore, the gender-neutral language of the Citizenship Act does not recognise a foreign-origin sexual or gender minority spouse.

=== Intervenors ===
==== National Commission for Protection of Child Rights ====
The National Commission for Protection of Child Rights (NCPCR), a statutory body of the Union Government, intervened in the case opposing the extension of the right to adopt for sexual and gender minority individuals in India.

It argued that the current Legislative Policy does not envision same-sex adoptions. The Hindu Adoption and Maintenance Act of 1956 explicitly recognises opposite-sex couples. Therefore, it implies that the Act does not recognise adoption by same-sex couples. The Juvenile Justice Act of 2015 prohibits single men from adopting a girl child. Therefore, it would restrict the gay couple from adopting a girl child.

India ratified the United Nations Convention on the Rights of the Child and the Hague Convention on Protection of Children and Co-operation in Respect of Intercountry Adoption on 11 December 1992 and 6 June 2003, respectively, and the treaties do not mention same-sex adoptions. Therefore, it can be inferred that it does not recognise same-sex adoptions.

Additionally, a 2015 report argues that studies showing no differences between same-sex and opposite-sex parents are flawed due to low sample sizes, selective choosing of the participants and biased responses by the participants. The report asserts that more rigorous studies show that children raised by parents in a same-sex relationship face greater emotional, developmental, and other difficulties than those raised by mothers and fathers, particularly by their married biological parents.

A 2015 US study found that emotional problems were twice as prevalent for children with same-sex parents than for opposite-sex parents. The study found the lowest risk of emotional problems in children living with both biological parents who were married. A longitudinal US study found that children of same-sex parents experienced an increased rate of depression and obesity as an adult.

Relying on the US Centers for Disease Control and Prevention report that gay and bisexual men are at high risk for sexually transmitted diseases, the NCPCR argued that gay and bisexual men could put their adopted children at risk.

==== Delhi Commission for Protection of Child Rights ====
The Delhi Commission for Protection of Child Rights (DCPCR), a statutory body of the Delhi Government led by the Aam Aadmi Party, intervened to support extending the right to marry and adopt for sexual and gender minority individuals in India.

It argued that the impact of legal recognition of same-sex marriage on gendered language in the current Legislative Policy does not present a serious concern. The Fundamental Rights conferred by the Constitution, which relies on gender-neutral terms such as "person" and "citizen", cannot be limited by the gendered language of the Statutes. The State has legal obligations to ensure non-discrimination of transgender people in matters including succession under the Transgender Persons Act of 2019 and NLSA v. UOI (2014). These mandates have warranted deviation from the literal interpretation of laws.

One of the reasons for gendered language is to ensure higher protection for women in heterosexual marriages, such as the Domestic Violence Act of 2005, the Dowry Prohibition Act of 1961 and sections granting additional grounds for divorce to women. Recognising same-sex marriage would not affect these provisions as they would still be relevant in opposite-sex marriages. Other conditions, such as maintenance, can be read down as gender-neutral.

The Indian Succession Act of 1925 governs the succession for the marriage registered under Special Marriage Act unless both parties are Hindu, Sikh, Buddhist or Jain. The Supreme Court reviewed the gendered language in the Hindu Minority and Guardianship Act of 1956 in Githa Hariharan v. Reserve Bank of India (1999). Similarly, the Hindu Succession Act of 1956, through legislative amendments and judicial decisions, has been made more gender-neutral.

Uncodified personal laws are not subject to judicial review. As uncodified personal laws govern guardianship for Muslims, Muslim same-sex spouses can rely on the Guardians and Wards Act of 1890 and seek the appointment of guardians through court on a case-to-case basis. Similarly, uncodified personal laws govern succession for Muslims. If Muslim same-sex couples register their marriage under Special Marriage Act, succession will be handled by Indian Succession Act.

Additionally, more than 50 countries allow same-sex couples to legally adopt children, including 2 in Asia — Israel and Lebanon — 22 in Europe, and 16 in the Americas. Constitutional Courts have agreed that there is no reason to deny adoption rights due to sexual orientation, including the South Africa in the National Coalition for Gay and Lesbian Equality v. Minister of Home Affairs (2000) and Du Toit v. Minister of Welfare and Population Department (2002), the United States in Florida Department v. Adoption of X.X.G (2010) and Obergefell v. Hodges (2015), the European Court of Human Rights in Salguiero Da Silva Mouta v. Portugal (1999) and E.B. v. France (2008) and Inter-American Court of Human Rights in Advisory Opinion (2018).

A Brazilian legal and psychoanalysis found that the relevant factors in determining whether a couple can be a good parent depend on the capacity to care for the child and the quality of the relationship between parent and child.

Multiple studies have shown that same-sex parents are no different from opposite-sex parents. An American Psychological Association report concluded that the home environment provided by same-sex parents to support and enable the psychosocial growth of their children is not different from the home environment provided by opposite-sex parents. A 2021 study analysed the administrative data from several population registers from the Netherlands from 2006 to 2018. The study included complete population coverage, reliable identification of same-sex families, verifiable educational outcomes and detailed measures of family dynamics over the children's life course. The study found that in a socio-political environment characterised by high levels of legislative or public support, children of same-sex parents achieved as well as children of opposite-sex parents.

As same-sex couples started adopting in 1995 but were allowed to marry only in 2013, a study found that the delay affected same-sex families negatively, including the health, education and other responsibilities toward their children.

The DCPCR also relied on the scientific consensus that sexual orientation and gender identity are established at least by adolescence. A Systematic Review and Meta-Analysis found that sexual orientation develops around the age of 13.

In the socio-legal environment where sexual and gender minority individuals do not have equal rights as cisgender heterosexual counterparts, acceptance, assimilation and legitimacy remains troubled. Despite the US Supreme Court ruling on same-sex marriage, the US State of Ohio refrained from enacting anti-discrimination laws, creating a less favourable legal environment for sexual and gender minority individuals than other states. A study found that sexual and gender minority adolescents in Ohio were twice as likely to face bullying and harassment in school than their cisgender heterosexual counterparts.

===== Guidelines =====
The DCPCR recommended the following guidelines to ensure the well-being of children in same-sex adoptions:

- The Union and State Governments create public awareness that same-sex families are as "normal" as opposite-sex families and that children of same-sex families are not incomplete.
- School boards and educational institutions normalise same-sex families proactively.
- National and State Council for Education, Research and Training to review and eliminate homophobic content and include a more diverse understanding of the families in school textbooks.
- Relevant Authorities should create dedicated helplines and set aside resources for counselling for children facing stigma and bullying due to belonging to a same-sex family unit.

==== Jamiat Ulema-e-Hind ====
Islamic organisation Jamiat Ulema-e-Hind and Telangana Markazi Shia Ulema Council intervened in the case opposing the extension of the right to marry and establish a family to sexual and gender minority individuals in India on socio-legal and religious grounds.

It argued that marriage, founded on established societal norms, cannot change following newly developed values emerging from a different worldview in a different paradigm. The concept of same-sex marriage attacks the family system rather than building a family through the process. Same-sex marriage recognition in certain countries, which achieved a certain threshold of social order in terms of education and social acceptance, cannot justify introducing the concept in India.

Moreover, a person identifying as a follower of a particular religion should believe in the foundational norms of the same. When a person fails to follow the religious norms, they are considered a sinner. A person who questions and seeks to amend well-established religious norms is not a follower of the religion. Therefore, there cannot be an imposition of a radical non-religious view on established, inseparable and core principles of religion.

According to Islam, marriage is a sacred contract between a cis man and cis woman. The current sexual and gender minority rights movement originated from the Western sexual liberation movement, an atheistic movement, in the 1960s. Therefore, atheistic values should not be allowed to create any space within the religiously governed personal laws of the communities.

The Supreme Court held that personal laws have constitutional protection under Article 25 in Shayara Bano v. UOI (2017). The petitioner's request is against the established understanding of marriage in all personal laws.

The legislative intent to recognise marriage as a union of a cis man and cis woman is evident. The Supreme Court recognised the separation of power as a part of the basic structure of the Indian Constitution in Kesavananda Bharati v. State of Kerala (1973). The legislature enacts laws as per the social acceptability based on the prevailing values of a society. The Supreme Court held that judicial adjudication cannot be equated to law-making by legislators in Ashwani Kumar v. Union of India (2020).

==== Telangana Markazi Shia Ulema Council ====
Islamic organisation Telangana Markazi Shia Ulema Council intervened in the case opposing the extension of the right to marry and establish a family to sexual and gender minority individuals in India on socio-legal and religious grounds.

== Preliminary hearings ==
Court	Date	Judges	
High Court of Kerala	27 Jan 2020	J. Anu Sivaraman	The Bench admitted the petition from a gay couple, Nikesh and Sonu, seeking legal recognition of their marriage
High Court of Delhi	14 Sep 2020	CJ. D.N. Patel and J. Prateek Jalan	The Bench admitted the petition from sexual and gender minority individuals, Abhijit Iyer Mitra, Gopi Shankar M, Giti Thadani and G. Oorvas, seeking legal recognition of same-sex marriage.
Supreme Court of India	25 Nov 2022	CJI. D.Y. Chandrachud and J.Hima Kohli	The Bench admitted two petitions from gay couples, Supriya Chakraborty & Abhay Dang and Parth Phiroze Mehrotra & Uday Raj Anand, seeking legal recognition of their marriage. The Bench sought a response from the Union Government.
Supreme Court of India	3 Jan 2023	CJI. D.Y. Chandrachud and J. P.S. Narasimha	The Bench listed the transfer petition about the pending High Court cases pertaining to marriage between sexual and gender minority individuals to the next hearing date for Supreme Court cases pertaining to marriage between sexual and gender minority individuals.
Supreme Court of India	6 Jan 2023	CJI. D.Y. Chandrachud, J. P.S. Narasimha and J. J.B. Pardiwala	The Bench admitted four new petitions to join the case. The Bench directed high courts to transfer nine similar petitions— eight from Delhi High Court and one from Kerala High Court to itself.
Supreme Court of India	30 Jan 2023	CJI. D.Y. Chandrachud, J. P.S. Narasimha and J. J.B. Pardiwala	The Bench admitted the petition from a lesbian couple, Kajal and Bhawna, to join the case.
Supreme Court of India	10 Feb 2023	CJI. D.Y. Chandrachud, J. P.S. Narasimha and J. J.B. Pardiwala	The Bench admitted the petition from a lesbian couple, Amburi Roy and Aparna Saha, to join the case.
Supreme Court of India	20 Feb 2023	CJI. D.Y. Chandrachud, J. P.S. Narasimha and J. J.B. Pardiwala	The Bench admitted the petition from three trans women, Akkai Padmashali, Vyjayanti Vasanta Mogli and Uma P, to join the case.
Supreme Court of India	3 Mar 2023	CJI. D.Y. Chandrachud, J. P.S. Narasimha and J. J.B. Pardiwala	The Bench admitted the petition from three anonymous couples from sexual and gender minority communities facing an immediate threat and four sexual and gender minority rights activists, Rituparna Borah, Chayanika Shah, Minakshi Sanyal and Maya Sharma, to join the case.
Supreme Court of India	13 Mar 2023	CJI. D.Y. Chandrachud, J. P.S. Narasimha and J. J.B. Pardiwala	Solicitor General filed the government's response, arguing the petition as wholly unsustainable, untenable and misplaced and urging the 3-judge Bench to dismiss the petition. Considering the cases involve constitutional and statutory questions of law, the Bench invoked Article 145(3) and referred it to the 5-judge Constitutional Bench. The Bench also admitted a petition from Harish Iyer to join the case.

== Oral arguments ==
The oral arguments before the Constitution bench commenced on 18 April 2023. After a total of ten days of hearings from both the petitioners and respondents, the Bench concluded the hearings and reserved their verdict on 11 May 2023.

=== Jurisdiction ===
On 18 April 2023, Solicitor General Mehta filed an affidavit from the Union Government, arguing that petitions lacked tenability. He reasoned that the issues raised in the Case were in the jurisdiction of the Parliament and the State Legislatures. He maintained that the subjects were out of the Supreme Court's jurisdiction and urged the Bench to dismiss the Case. Senior Advocate Rohatgi and Vishwanathan swiftly countered the arguments put forth by Solicitor General Mehta. They strongly asserted their right to be heard by the Supreme Court, as guaranteed by Article 32, particularly on matters related to the infringement of fundamental rights guaranteed by Part 3 of the Indian Constitution. Chief Justice D.Y. Chandrachud and Justice S.K. Kaul rejected the Solicitor General's motion to pre-empt the submissions of petitioners.

Senior Advocate Rohatgi emphasized that the Supreme Court has the jurisdiction and responsibility to address violations of fundamental rights, even if only a few individuals are affected. He argued that waiting for parliamentary action is not an adequate response when fundamental rights are at stake.

I have no voice in Parliament. [However,] I have a voice [when it comes to] coming to open the doors of this court [and to] come here and plead before your Lordships.

— Senior Advocate Rohatgi, 19th April 2023

Senior Advocate Rohatgi pointed out that justices have consistently rejected the argument that the number of affected individuals is insignificant, as even one person's fundamental rights being violated is enough to seek redress from the Court. The duty of the Court under Article 32 of the Constitution is to protect and uphold the rights of individuals, regardless of their minority status.

Senior Advocate Guruswamy argued that the Indian Parliament, unlike British Parliament, is not a sovereign body with unlimited powers but is constrained by the Constitution. Chief Justice D.Y. Chandrachud pointed out that Parliament has legislative authority over the matters covered in the case, such as marriage, divorce, and adoption. They discussed the need for Parliament to enact laws to give effect to certain rights, as seen in the case of privacy. Senior Advocate Guruswamy emphasized that citizens have the right to approach the Supreme Court under Article 32 when fundamental rights are violated. She contended that marriage constitutes a fundamental right, and she argued that the court must engage in statutory interpretation to grant statutory recognition of this right to couples from sexual and gender minority communities.

==== Statutory Interpretation ====
In addressing concerns about the courts' institutional capacity to interpret laws, Senior Advocate Singhvi referenced the UK House of Lords case, Ghaidan v. Godin-Mendoza, where statutory interpretation was separated from parliamentary intent and statutory text, including instances of unambiguous language, introducing an approach that prioritizes convention rights. He highlighted the court's authority to reinterpret legislation to align with convention rights within the constraints of the "thrust" of legislation and institutional capability of the court. Senior Advocate Singhvi highlighted that the underlying thrust of the Special Marriage Act in India is to allow individuals, irrespective of their religious beliefs, to enter into marriages, emphasizing the need for its interpretation to align with the Constitution of India.

==== Workability of law ====
Senior Advocate Kirpal addresses concerns raised by the Bench and the Union Government regarding the practicality and effectiveness in recognizing fundamental rights through judicial interpretation. He argued against accepting unworkability as a defence against judicial review of laws that infringe upon fundamental rights. Senior Advocate Kirpal emphasizes that accepting the workability defence would enable Parliament to intentionally draft laws in a way that protects them from judicial review, even if they violate fundamental rights. This precedent would undermine the Court's constitutional duty to protect the fundamental rights of citizens.

==== Personal law ====
On 18 April, Chief Justice D.Y. Chandrachud suggested steering clear of personal law and focusing on the Special Marriage Act for the arguments. Senior Advocate Guruswamy expressed concerns about the Hindu Marriage Act, to which the Chief Justice D.Y. Chandrachud responded that confining themselves to the Hindu Marriage Act may not be sufficient, considering other marriage acts applicable to different religious communities. Chief Justice D.Y. Chandrachud proposed an incremental approach to the interpretation of laws and societal evolution. Justice S.K. Kaul highlighted the importance of focusing on the core issue and suggested confining the discussion to the interpretation of the Special Marriage Act without delving into personal law issues.

=== Right to marry ===
The petitioners reasoned that the right to marry falls within the fundamental rights outlined in Articles 19 and 21 of the Constitution. Senior Advocate Rohatgi, representing the petitioners, argued that family, marriage, and procreation are integral to human dignity, which is safeguarded by Article 21. He further emphasized that procreation encompasses adoption, IVF, and surrogacy in today's context. Additionally, he highlighted the Supreme Court's ruling in Puttaswamy v. UOI, which recognized marriage as a component of privacy. Senior Advocate Ramachandran reiterated that the right to marry is a part of the right to life as enshrined in Article 21.

Senior Advocate Rohatgi argued that the right to marry has been recognised as a constitutional right by the Supreme Court in Shakti Vahini v. UOI (2018), Shafin Jahan v Ashokan K.M. (2018) and Laxmibai Chandaragi B. v. State of Karnataka (2021).

Senior Advocate Anand Grover focused his arguments on the concept of 'intimate association' in US Courts, citing relevant cases such as Griswold v Connecticut (1965), Roberts v. United States Jaycees (1984), and Obergefell v. Hodges (2015). He argued that these cases recognized marriage as a fundamental right that brings harmony to a way of life. Senior Advocate Kothari, representing the petitioners, relied on the Universal Declaration of Human Rights and the International Convention of Civil and Political Rights to argue that the right to marry and form a family are fundamental rights.

=== Sexual and gender minority rights ===
Senior Advocate Singhvi, representing the petitioners, claimed that the right to choose in marital relationships regardless of sex, sexual orientation, gender, and gender orientation is at the heart of this case. He argued that individuals within the sexual and gender minority community have the right to marry without facing discrimination. He emphasized that discriminating against homosexual couples based on inherent characteristics like sexual orientation and identity would violate the Right to Equality. Even if a law is specifically created to establish such a classification, it must still adhere to the principles of equality and non-discrimination outlined in Article 14. Senior Advocate Kirpal, representing the petitioners, emphasized that the sexual and gender minority community's pursuit extends beyond seeking equal rights already granted to heterosexual individuals; it is a declaration of their inherent entitlement to fundamental rights.

Senior Advocate Singhvi further stated that the freedom of expression under Article 19 encompasses the right to express one's gender in all its forms. Excluding sexual and gender minority individuals from the right to marriage also infringes upon their right to dignity. It is the government's responsibility to ensure that laws comply with the Constitution.

Senior Advocate Vishwanathan, representing the petitioners, discussed the Transgender Persons (Protection of Rights) Act of 2019 and the NALSA v. UOI Judgment (2014), emphasizing that these legal frameworks grant transgender and non-binary individuals various rights, including voting, marriage, and property ownership.

Senior Advocate Anand Grover pointed out that according to the law, if a cisgender man marries a cisgender woman and later identifies as a woman, the marriage is not considered invalid. The law acknowledges the existence of such marriages, as they are a part of our society. Senior Advocate Kothari, representing the petitioners, argued for the equal rights of trans persons to marry and form families. She emphasized that family is not exclusive to heterosexual individuals and highlighted that trans persons already have families. However, she pointed out that their right to marry is not recognized, leading to discrimination based on sex under Article 15 of the Constitution.

==== Heteronormative framework ====
Senior Advocate Singhvi has rejected the argument that the State's definition of marriage, limited to a union between a man and a woman, can serve as a valid basis for denying the recognition of same-sex marriages, considering it as a circular and self-referential form of reasoning.

Senior Advocate Rohatgi emphasized the need to dismantle the heteronormative framework of marriage, acknowledging that intimate relationships are integral to the right to privacy. Drawing upon the Obergefell v Hodges (2015) case and other foreign precedents, he argued against imposing restrictions on consensual adult intimacy. Senior Advocate Rohatgi pleaded for recognizing the rights of sexual minorities to freely navigate public spaces, ensuring their right to marry and equal treatment in all aspects of life, including public employment and benefits.

Senior Advocate Luthra discussed an Austrian legal case that invalidated the distinction between marriage and registered partnerships for both same-sex and opposite-sex couples. She emphasized that although these institutions granted similar rights, they were inherently unequal due to discrimination based on sexual orientation. Emphasizing the Constitutional principles of equality and non-discrimination, she argued for the recognition of marriages of couples from sexual and gender minority communities.

Senior Advocate Kirpal contested the Union Government's assertion that marriage between sexual and gender minority individuals undermine the institution of marriage. He argued that in a marriage-centric society like India, excluding sexual and gender minority individuals from marriage leads to lavender marriages, trapping gay men and lesbian women in unhappy and disingenuous relationships. He further highlighted the potential harm caused when a gay man deceives a heterosexual woman into marriage. Senior Advocate Kirpal emphasized that these situations are more detrimental to marriage. Additionally, he highlighted that granting sexual and gender minority individuals the right to marry would not infringe upon the rights of heterosexual individuals.

==== Procreation ====
Senior Advocate Rohatgi argued that procreation, which encompasses diverse methods like adoption, IVF, and surrogacy in contemporary times, is integral to human dignity and is protected under Article 21.

Senior Advocate Vishwanathan challenged the notion that the inability to procreate justifies denying the right to marry. He emphasized that marriage laws do not impose an upper age limit, allowing individuals beyond reproductive capacity to enter into marriage. Additionally, He stressed that the ability or intention to have children is not a prerequisite for marriage. He argued that procreation is a secondary aspect of marriage, rather than a fundamental requirement.

Expressing concerns about the Union Government's argument, Senior Advocate Vishwanathan highlighted the harmful consequences of denying the right to marry for sexual and gender minority individuals based on their inability to have children. He presented a hypothetical scenario illustrating the detrimental effects and the infringement on their security and rights. Justice S.R. Bhat cautioned against extreme possibilities and emphasized the importance of considering realistic situations. To support his point, Senior Advocate Vishwanathan cited instances of eugenics practices in other countries, underscoring the potential dangers. He also argued against the perception that marriage is solely for procreation, emphasizing its broader significance. Justice S.R. Bhat echoed this sentiment, stating that procreation should not be disproportionately emphasized in such a manner.

==== Parenthood ====
Senior Advocate Vishwanathan argued that there is no evidence to suggest that couples from sexual and gender minority communities are unable to provide the safety, welfare, and security that children require. Chief Justice D.Y Chandrachud acknowledged that even in traditional households, there can be instances of domestic violence and emphasized that absolutes do not exist.

=== Cultural, social and religious values ===
Senior Advocate Singhvi, representing the petitioners, highlighted the need for laws to adapt to the evolving nature of society. He strongly argued against prioritizing societal values over the Constitutional principles of equality and non-discrimination, firmly asserting that culture and morality should not override the Constitution.

Senior Advocate Singhvi outlined several motives behind people's desire for marriage, including seeking societal recognition and acceptance of their relationships, ensuring safety and security, finding personal fulfilment, and embracing a fundamental aspect of family life.

Senior Advocate Singhvi highlighted the secular nature of the Special Marriage Act, emphasizing its departure from cultural-based personal marriage laws. He cited the objectives of the Act, which aimed to enable individuals in India, regardless of their faith, to enter into a marriage. Chief Justice D.Y. Chandrachud inquired about the faith-agnostic nature of the Act, to which Singhvi concurred. Additionally, Senior Advocate Singhvi noted that if the Act remained independent of faith, it would similarly transcend cultural contexts due to the strong intertwining of religion and culture.

==== Urban elitism ====
On 19 April, the government argued before the court that the concept of same-sex marriage was a "mere urban elitist view for the purpose of social acceptance."

As Senior Advocate Singhvi argued that sexual orientation is an innate characteristic, Chief Justice D.Y. Chandrachud observed that it counters the claim that sexual orientation might be elitist, urban-centric, or influenced by class bias. Chief Justice D.Y. Chandrachud further explained that an innate characteristic could exhibit class bias and remarked that its manifestations might be more prevalent in urban areas due to increased acceptability.

Senior Advocate Vishwanathan represented Zainab Patel, a trans woman petitioner disowned by her family. He highlighted that despite her experience of being forced to beg on the streets, Zainab Patel's resilience and determination propelled her to achieve the position of Director at KPMG. He criticized the Union Government for lacking compassion in labelling her as an urban elitist.

Senior Advocate Kothari, representing Akai Padmashan, a trans woman petitioner disowned by her family, highlighted that at 15 years old, Akai Padmashan faced homelessness and had to leave school. Noting Akai Padmashan's successful reintegration into mainstream society, Senior Advocate emphasized recognizing that these individuals often come from impoverished and working-class backgrounds. Senior Advocate Kothari criticized the Union Government for unjustly labelling their struggles as elitist concerns.

Senior Advocate Anand Grover rebutted the Union Government's argument that relationship between sexual and gender minority individuals were 'urban' and 'elitist' ideas by presenting evidence of 10 court protection orders of sexual and gender minority individuals in India, all hailing from poor and rural backgrounds.

In response to the respondents' attempt to portray marriage between sexual and gender minority individuals as urban elitist concept. Senior Advocate Ramachandran, representing the lesbian couple Kajal and Bhawna, highlighted the insightful words of Justice Vivian Bose from 1956.

The Constitution also exists for the common man, for the poor and the humble, for those who have businesses at stake. For the butcher, the baker, and the candlestick maker.

— Justice Vivian Bose, Bidi Supply Company v. Union of India (1956)

Senior Advocate Ramachandran specifically highlighted Kajal's occupation as a baker, emphasizing that she embodies the very individuals Justice Vivian Bose had in mind. He further noted that Kajal, a Dalit woman from Muktsar in Punjab, and Bhavna, from Bahadurgarh in Haryana, belong to a backward caste, challenging the notion of an urban elite. He argued that the recognition of their marriage provides essential societal protection from their own unsupportive natal families.

Senior Advocate Vrinda Grover drew the Bench's attention to the violence and discrimination faced by sexual and gender minority individuals, particularly trans individuals, from their own families. She emphasized that trans persons are often compelled to suppress their identities in front of their natal families. In line with the arguments put forth by Senior Advocate Ramachandran, she asserted that recognizing their marriages is essential to provide them with the support and protection that their natal families have failed to provide.

==== Western influence ====
Senior Advocate Rohatgi countered the Union Government's claim that relationships between sexual and gender minority individuals were a Western influence. He emphasized the historical presence of homosexuality in Indian culture predating the imposition of Victorian morality by the British in the 1800s. Senior Advocate Rohatgi supported his argument with evidence from the Khajuraho temple carvings, which depict same-sex relationships existing in India for centuries. Senior Advocate Anand Grover further highlighted the respectful recognition of transgender individuals in ancient Indian scriptures. He attributed the negative attitudes towards them to British influence, which permeated our society. These evidence contradicts the notion that relationships between sexual and gender minority individuals are solely an imported concept.

=== Comity of nations ===
Senior Advocate Luthra, representing the same-sex couple, emphasized that their marriage, legally recognized in the United States but not in India, should be recognised in India under the Foreign Marriage Act of 1969. She pointed out that the Act states that the recognition can be denied only if the foreign marriage is inconsistent with international law or the comity of nations. She highlighted the discrepancy that arises when a marriage is recognized in one country but loses recognition upon entering India. She pointed out that the recognition of same-sex marriages in 34 countries, including the country where the marriage took place, indicates conformity with international legal standards.

=== Legal relief sought ===
==== Constitutional recognition ====
Senior Advocate Rohatgi argued against a mere amendment to the act without a clear declaration. He reasoned that relying solely on the interpretation of the act would leave it vulnerable to potential future amendments, which could lead to unfavorable outcomes. Consequently, he respectfully urged the court to issue a constitutional declaration that would explicitly recognize marriage for diverse groups, drawing parallels to the recognition already afforded to heterosexual couples.

==== Statutory recognition ====
Senior Advocate Rohatgi argued that declaration of constitutional recognition of right to marry would be symbolic and it is necessary to provide statutory recognition to exercise the right.

Senior Advocate Rohatgi began explaining potential ways the Special Marriage Act could be interpreted by the court, highlighting that if the court recognizes a constitutional right to marriage for sexual and gender minority couples, the Act, being subservient to the Indian Constitution, might be deemed unconstitutional due to its exclusive clauses. He stressed that his purpose in outlining these possible judicial interpretations is to protect the Act's constitutional validity.

Senior Advocate Singhvi contended that using legislative intent as a defense against an equality challenge is invalid, as it constitutes circular and self-referential reasoning. He cited the UK House of Lords case, Ghaidan v. Godin-Mendoza, to advocate for an interpretation of statutes that aligns with the constitution, emphasizing the significance of fundamental rights over legislative intent and statutory language. He highlighted that the underlying thrust of the Special Marriage Act in India is to allow individuals, irrespective of their religious beliefs, to enter into marriages, emphasizing the need for its interpretation to align with the Constitution of India.

===== Marriageable age =====
The minimum age for marriage is specified in Section 4(c) of the Special Marriage Act and Section 4(c) of the Foreign Marriage Act, which mandates that a man must be 21 years old, and a woman must be 18 years old.

On 19 April, while advocating for a gender-neutral interpretation of various sections of the Special Marriage Act, Senior Advocate Rohatgi argued that retaining the terms "male" and "female" for determining the minimum age for marriage is necessary to prevent legal ambiguity arising from gender-based differences in marriageable age. Chief Justice D.Y. Chandrachud further inquired about the minimum age for marriage concerning gender non-binary individuals.

===== Prohibited degree of kinship =====
The prohibited degree of kinship are outlined in Section 2(b) of the Special Marriage Act, stating that a man cannot marry anyone listed in Part I of the first schedule, which exclusively includes female relatives, and a woman cannot marry anyone listed in Part II of the first schedule, which exclusively comprises male relatives. The prohibited degrees of relationships, as delineated in Section 2(b) of the Special Marriage Act, apply to marriages conducted under the Foreign Marriage Act, as per Section 2(a) of the Foreign Marriage Act.

On 19 April, Senior Advocate Rohatgi argued that unintended consequences arising from recognizing marriages for couples from the sexual and gender minority community could be resolved by interpreting Section 2(b) of the Special Marriage Act to allow the terms "man" and "woman" to be understood as "person," effectively merging the gendered lists.

==== Recognition of ancillary rights ====
On 18 April, Senior Advocate Guruswamy argued that merely recognizing the fundamental right to marry would not sufficiently address the practical aspects of life for sexual and gender minority individuals. She reasoned that in addition to the right to marry, there is a need for specific laws that enable them to access insurance, purchase or rent homes, open bank accounts, and engage in similar activities. Senior Advocate Guruswamy emphasized that if the Supreme Court fails to address these practical aspects in the present instance, the petitioners would be compelled to repeatedly approach the court for resolution on each individual aspect.

On 27 April, as Solicitor General Mehta firmly opposed recognising the marriage of couples from sexual and gender minority communities, Chief Justice D.Y. Chandrachud told Solicitor General Mehta to provide an alternative solution to accommodate the various rights available to married couples for same-sex couples. On 3 May, Solicitor General Mehta told the Bench that a committee would be formed under the Cabinet Secretary. The Bench noted that committee would require coordination with multiple ministries, and suggested the petitioners to submit a list of issues. Further, the Bench clarified that they would still be deciding the right to marry in the Case. The administrative measure of forming a committee is something that must take place regardless of how the case is decided.

== Judgment ==
On 17 October 2023, the Supreme Court ruled unanimously that the legalization of same-sex marriage is a matter for the Parliament to decide, not the courts. In a 3–2 decision, it ruled against ordering the government to introduce civil unions, and in a separate 3-2 decision, ruled against ordering the government to allow adoption by same-sex couples. However, the court unanimously accepted the government's suggestion that it set up a high-powered committee headed by the Cabinet Secretary to investigate the discrimination faced by LGBT people and study providing limited legal rights and benefits to same-sex couples, including with regard to access to joint bank accounts, recognition as next-of-kin, medical decisions for a hospitalised partner, prison visitations, and succession rights. Chief Justice Chandrachud wrote that the court could not declare the SMA unconstitutional because this would bar inter-faith and inter-caste marriages, and argued that reading same-sex couples into the Act would violate the separation of powers:

This court cannot either strike down the constitutional validity of the Special Marriage Act or read words into the Special Marriage Act because of its institutional limitations. The court, in the exercise of the power of judicial review, must steer clear of matters, particularly those impinging on policy, which fall in the legislative domain. […] The judiciary cannot legislate."

Chandrachud refuted the government's arguments that homosexuality was "urban" or "elitist", and reiterated judicial precedent that discrimination on the basis of sexual orientation is prohibited by the Indian Constitution. He also ruled that Parliament has the power to legalise same-sex marriage, "The institution of marriage is not static - all social institutions transform over time and marriage is no exception. Despite vehement opposition to departure from practice, the institution of marriage has changed, it has metamorphosed. It has transformed from the time of our ancestors 200 years ago." Justice S.K. Kaul agreed with Chandrachud that same-sex relationships had been recognised in India from antiquity, "not just in terms of sexual activities but as relationships that fostered love, emotional support and mutual care", but ruled that the "court cannot grant [LGBT] people the right to marry as that is a legislative exercise". The majority opinion of the court also states that transgender people may marry. "A transgender man can marry a transgender woman. If a transgender person wishes to marry a heterosexual person, their marriage will be recognised if one is a man and another a woman."

== Review Petition ==
One of the petitioners in Supriyo filed a petition for review by the Supreme Court on 1 November 2023. The petitioner asked the court to review the decision in light of "its self-contradictory conclusion": "The Petitioners respectfully submit that this Court ought to review and correct its decision […] because the impugned judgment suffers from errors apparent on the face of the record and is self-contradictory and manifestly unjust."

On 9 January 2025, the Supreme Court rejected petitions seeking a review of an October 2023 verdict which refused to legalise same-sex marriage.

== Legal Analysis ==
Masoom Sanyal underscored a fundamental incongruity in the majority's approach, wherein explicit determinations of discrimination coexist with a reluctance to furnish a direct remedy. He asserted that the court, upon discerning indirect discrimination, should not absolve itself from the constitutional obligation to rectify the injustice. Masoom Sanyal brought attention to Justice S.K. Kaul's dissenting stance, wherein Justice referenced South African constitutional principles and advocated for an interpretive methodology that considers the 'spirit, purport, and objects' of fundamental rights in statutory interpretation. Masoom Sanyal advocated for embracing judicial creativity within the confines of safeguarding fundamental rights and upholding the Constitution.

Mihir Rajamane and Deeksha Viswanathan challenges the perceived conflict between queer demands for gender neutrality and feminist demands for gender protection, advocating for a 'queer-feminist' frame. They recognise that existing gender inequalities in society and agree that the gendered laws are often necessary to ensure true equality in the context of 'social reality.' However, they highlight the instances where gendered provisions were critiqued for perpetuating gender hierarchy and warned against the potential harm of gendered legal measures reinforcing harmful stereotypes. They discussed the anti-stereotyping principle, as developed in judicial decisions, to underscore the need for critical evaluation of the impact of gendered provisions. Mihir Rajamane and Deeksha Viswanathan advocated for an approach that does not privilege either neutrality or 'protection', but the actual effect on the freedoms of women and gender minorities.

== Commentary ==
The hearings on marriage between sexual and gender minority individuals ignited a public debate on the issue, thereby increasing public awareness about sexual and gender minority individuals in India and their experiences. The media provided a platform for sexual and gender minority individuals in India to share their stories and perspectives.

=== Jurisdiction ===
A group of retired judges pointed out that separation of power is a basic structure of the Constitution and argued that law-making power is an exclusive domain of the legislature. Rohin Bhatt countered that it is not a judiciary overreach but one of interpreting the statutes. Anish Gawande pointed out that judicial review played a crucial role in protecting fundamental rights granted to Indian citizens, especially when the Legislature was hesitant to act. Despite facing political opposition, the Court's commitment to upholding these rights has been a cornerstone of Indian democracy

Former Member of the Council of States Swapan Dasgupta and Law professors G.S. Bajpai and Ankit Kaushik joined the retired judges arguing that legal recognition of marriage between sexual and gender minority individuals concerns the entire Society. Therefore, the Society and the Parliament should debate and decide on the issue. Pointing out the lack of sexual and gender minority voices in the legislative spaces, Jaideep Singh Lalli disputed the idea of parliament having legitimacy to decide sexual and gender minority rights issues as a "representative" body. Rohin Bhatt contended that sexual and gender minority individuals could not wait for society to think it is acceptable for sexual and gender minority individuals to have equal rights. He argued that the rights are not bestowed upon sexual and gender minority individuals by society but instead accorded to sexual and gender minority individuals as equal citizens of the country.

Anish Gawande argued that a political commitment to the primacy of Parliament is important, but it must be accompanied by a firm rejection of its supremacy. Drawing attention to the lack of parliamentary debate on two private member's bills introduced on the same issue by Members of the House of the People Supriya Sule and DNV Senthilkumar, he asserted that the Parliament has failed to protect sexual and gender minority rights in India. He said the courts must ensure fundamental rights are not sacrificed at the altar of populist politics.

=== Definition of marriage ===
Mani Chander pointed out that the Union Government used an outdated American legal dictionary to define marriage in the counter affidavit. The counter affidavit included the definition of marriage as a union of one man and one woman from the 4th Revised Edition of Black's Law Dictionary published in 1968. However, the 9th Edition, published in 2009, defines marriage as a legal union of a couple as spouses.

Law professors G.S. Bajpai and Ankit Kaushik joined the retired judges in stressing the importance of procreation in marriage. Pointing to the provision for the annulment of marriage due to the infertility of a partner, G.S. Bajpai and Ankit Kaushik argued that procreation is an essential requirement in the legal conception of marriage. Rohin Bhatt retorted that the law does not apply to heterosexual couples who mutually decide against procreation. Similarly, sexual and gender minority individuals enter the relationship fully aware of their inability to procreate.

=== Ancillary rights ===
While noting that couples from sexual and gender minority communities may have a legitimate reason to seek legal protection, Tahir Mahmood pointed to the cohabitation rights recognised by the Courts. He contended that the couples forcibly separated could file for a writ of Habeas Corpus. If these were not satisfactory, he argued that same-sex could request the Parliament to pass civil partnership.

=== Health ===
The retired judges suggested that the recognition of same-sex marriage in the United States was responsible for new HIV infections in the United States. Kanav N. Sahgal pointed out that the retired judges relied on the report that identified stigma, homophobia, and discrimination as a cause for the increased susceptibility of gay and bisexual men to HIV infections to make their baseless argument. Kanav N. Sahgal argued that recognition of marriage might reduce the stigma and improve access to healthcare. According to the Indian National AIDS Control Organisation, gay and bisexual people were responsible for only 2.5 per cent of the transmission, whereas heterosexual people were responsible for 83.1 per cent.

==== Parenthood ====
Tahir Mahmood claimed that the children adopted by same-sex parents would suffer embarrassment in society. The retired judges argued that the psychological development of children adopted by same-sex parents would be affected due to the lack of "balanced parenthood". Kanav N. Sahgal pointed out that the scientific evidence suggests that same-sex parents are not different from opposite-sex parents.

=== Cultural, social and religious values ===
Most commenters noted that marriage in India is a sacred and revered institution rooted in socio-religious customs, with a complex religious and legal relationship. Rohin Bhatt pointed out that Indian law on marriage is a mixture of common law and religious law. He contended that marriage under Hindu law stopped being a sacrament when divorce was introduced. He pointed out that scholars such as Ruth Vanita and Saleem Kidwai have demonstrated that LGBT relationships were not an aberration in Hinduism.

Shahrukh Alam noted the irony in Jamiat-e-ulema-e-Hind, an organisation with a distinguished history of resisting imperialism, arguing for the hegemonic imposition of social and religious norms. She argued that Jamiat-e-ulema-e-Hind's approach to religious norms is the same as the Bharatiya Janata Party-led Union Government's approach to National Security. They both refuse to acknowledge and engage with divergent views.

==== Personal liberty ====
In response to the Jamiat-e-ulema-e-Hind's intervention application, Shahrukh Alam pointed out that some advocates in the Hijab Ban Case relied on freedom of expression and personal autonomy. They argued in good faith when they reasoned the identity should be constructed holistically without being demarcated into religious and secular spaces. She urged young people to reject the Jamiat-e-ulema-e-Hind argument that if one wants to be different, do it in one's own non-religious space.

==== Western influence ====
The retired judges claimed that those demanding the legal recognition of marriage between sexual and gender minority individuals lacked knowledge and regard for the civilisation and institution of marriage, and that the interest groups were trying to impose Western thoughts, philosophies and practices on Indian Society. Literary historian Ruth Vanita pointed out that Indian opponents arguing that marriage between sexual and gender minority individuals is against Indian culture were ironically borrowing the argument from Western opponents, who claimed that marriage between sexual and gender minority individuals is against Western culture.

=== Controversy ===
Among the commenters, 21 retired High Courts judges co-signed an open letter stating that the petitioners were attacking the root of the Indian family system. Writing for The Wire, Vrinda Gopinath reported that at least 11 of them had worked for the Bharatiya Janata Party-led government in some capacity following their retirement. She reported various ethical violations, including Justice Raghuvendra Singh Rathore detaining his daughter to prevent her inter-caste marriage, which compelled the Supreme Court to intervene.

== Reactions ==
=== Community organisations ===
==== Namma Pride ====
Bangalore-based sexual and gender minority community organisation Namma Pride and civil rights group Coalition for Sex Workers and Sexual Minorities Rights co-published an open letter responding to the affidavit filed by Union Government on 12 March 2023. The letter criticised the Union Government for disregarding its constitutional commitment to secure the rights of sexual and gender minority individuals in India and perpetuating discriminatory marriage laws. The letter called out the Union Government for the hostile statement that couples from sexual and gender minority communities and opposite-sex couples are distinct classes and that couples from sexual and gender minority communities are undeserving of equal treatment.

==== Sweekar ====
Sweekar— the Rainbow Parents is a group of parents of 400 sexual and gender minority children. They wrote an open letter to the Chief Justice of India urging him to consider marriage between sexual and gender minority individuals. They expressed their desire to see their children and our children-in-law find legal acceptance of their relationship. Noting that they are growing old and some will reach 80 years soon, they urged urgency in the matter.

==== Queerythm ====
Prijith P K, president of Thiruvananthapuram-based sexual and gender minority community organization Queerythm, accused Bharatiya Janata Party of filing a 'homophobic' counter-affidavit to cater to the social conservative voters for the upcoming elections at the cost of sexual and gender minority rights.

=== Political parties ===
==== Bharatiya Janata Party ====
BJP is a right-wing national party. On 12 March 2023, the Union Government under the leadership of BJP opposed extending the right to marry to sexual and gender minority individuals in India in the Supreme Court. The BJP-led State Government of Assam, Gujarat and Madhya Pradesh intervened in the Case opposing the extension of the right to adopt for sexual and gender minority individuals in India.

On 19 December 2022, BJP Member of the Council of States Sushil Kumar Modi expressed his opposition to the Judicial Review of the Indian marriage laws. He told the Parliament, "India is a country of 1.4 billion people, and two judges cannot just sit in a room and decide on such a socially significant subject. Instead, there should be a debate in Parliament as well as the society at large".

On 23 April 2023, the Bar Council of India, under the chairmanship of BJP member Manan Kumar Mishra, passed a Resolution stating that the Supreme Court should defer the matter to the Parliament. The Resolution received wide condemnation, including from the Supreme Court Bar Association, which reminded the BCI that Supreme Court was duty-bound to hear the petitioner before deciding on adjudication or referring to the Parliament.

At least 11 of 21 retired judges, who wrote an open letter criticising the petitioners for attacking the root of the Indian family system, had worked for the BJP-led government in some capacity following their retirement.

==== Indian National Congress ====
Congress is a centre-to-centre-left national party. As some senior leaders dismissed the extension of the right to marry to sexual and gender minority individuals in India as an unimportant or alien issue for Congress to take an official position, and others shared only their personal views, Congress does not have an official stance on the extending the right to marry to sexual and gender minority individuals in India. The Congress-led State Government of Rajasthan intervened in the Case opposing the extension of the right to adopt for sexual and gender minority individuals in India.

Congress Member of the Council of States Abhishek Singhvi, who is a lead counsel for one of the petitioners, argued for judicial intervention. He said that the questions about the possible legislative approach are meaningless as the BJP-led Union Government vociferously opposed extending the right to marry to sexual and gender minority individuals in India.

Congress Member of the House of the People Shashi Tharoor said denying civil rights to same-sex partners is wrong and unjustifiable and should be remedied without delay. Noting the resistance from the majority, he suggested a two-stage process where the first step is a civil partnership, a contract that grants the legal rights of spouses to same-sex partners. After seeing the impact on Indian society, the Union Government might recognise same-sex marriage.

Congress Member of the House of the People Manish Tewari said that following the decriminalisation of same-sex relations by the 5-judge Constitution Bench of the Supreme Court, legalisation of such relationships should be a natural corollary.

==== Trinamool Congress ====
Trinamool Congress is a centre-to-centre-right state party based in West Bengal, Tripura and Meghalaya. National general secretary Abhishek Banerjee endorsed legal recognition of marriage between sexual and gender minority individuals. A party spokesperson confirmed that it reflects the party's stance. Earlier, Mamata Banerjee, chairperson of the party and Chief Minister of West Bengal refused to comment on marriage between sexual and gender minority individuals, reasoning that it is a sub judice matter.

Trinamool Congress Member of the Council of States Derek O'Brien, who introduced a private member's bill to recognise marriage equality, published an opinion highlighting the personal experiences of sexual and gender minority individuals in India facing discrimination and prejudice. He concluded by emphasizing that the fight for same-sex marriage is not just about legalizing a union, but about fighting for the dignity and equal rights of the sexual and gender minority community.

Trinamool Congress Member of the House of the People Mahua Moitra criticised the Bar Council of India for failing their oath by promoting popular sentiment over constitutional morality. She pointed out that despite 49 per cent of Indian Citizens being women, all the members of the Bar Council of India were men. She questioned the legitimacy of the Bar Council of India in claiming to express the sentiments of 99.9 per cent of Indians.

==== YSR Congress Party ====
YSR Congress Party is a centre-left state party based in Andhra Pradesh. The YSR Congress Party-led State Government of Andhra Pradesh intervened in the Case opposing the extension of the right to adopt for sexual and gender minority individuals in India.

==== Dravida Munnetra Kazhagam ====
DMK is a centre-left state party based in Tamil Nadu and Puducherry. On 8 May 2023, DMK organising secretary R S Bharathi said the party has not decided on the stance.

DMK Member of the House of the People Thamizhachi Thangapandian, who has been closely following the proceedings, offered her full support. She awaits a favourable judgement that would make India the first UN-recognised nation from Asia to do so, a massive victory for sexual and gender minority rights globally.

==== Communist Party of India (Marxist) ====
CPI(M) is a left-wing national party. Member of the Politburo Brinda Karat said CPI(M) supports the rights of same-sex partners to get legal recognition of their relationship as a marriage. She called for judicial intervention, as the BJP-led Union Government opposed extending the right to marry for sexual and gender minority individuals in India.

==== Biju Janata Dal ====
Biju Janata Dal is a centre-left state party based in Odisha. As of 8 May 2023, the Party does not have an official stance on the issue.

In sharing his personal opinion, Biju Janata Dal Member of the Council of States Prasanna Acharya argued that Indian society is not comparable to Western society and, therefore, what may be suitable for the latter may not be appropriate for the former and opposed marriage between sexual and gender minority individuals.

==== Nationalist Congress Party ====
Nationalist Congress Party is a centrist state party based in Maharashtra and Nagaland. As of 8 May 2023, NCP does not have an official stance on the issue.

On 1 April 2022, NCP Member of the House of the People Supriya Sule had introduced a private member's bill in Parliament, to recognise same-sex marriages under the Special Marriage Act.

==== All India Anna Dravida Munnetra Kazhagam ====
AIADMK is a centre-left state party based in Tamil Nadu and Puducherry. As of 8 May 2023, the Party does not have an official stance on the issue.

On 8 May 2023, senior party leaders said that same-sex marriage is against Indian culture and raised concerns about the emotional impact on the adopted child of the same-sex couple.

==== Bharat Rashtra Samithi ====
Bharat Rashtra Samithi is a centrist state party based in Telangana. On 8 May 2023, BRS Member of the House of the People Nageshwar Rao said that opinion of state governments on same-sex marriage is irrelevant as they will abide by the Supreme Court's verdict.

==== Rashtriya Janata Dal ====
Rashtriya Janata Dal is a centre-left state party based in Bihar and Jharkhand. On 8 May 2023, RJD Vice-president Shivanand Tiwary said the party had not discussed the issue. RJD National Spokesperson Prof Subodh Kumar Mehta stated that commenting on a sub judice matter is against the ethos of the judiciary and refused to comment.

In sharing his personal opinion, RJD Vice-president Shivanand Tiwary criticized BJP's stance on same-sex marriage and supported the right of those with a same-sex sexual orientation to marry if they choose to, citing scientific evidence and examples from other countries where it is legal. He said that the recognition of same-sex marriage is next step following the decriminalisation of same-sex relations.

==== Communist Party of India ====
CPI is a left-wing state party based in Kerala, Manipur and Tamil Nadu. CPI was the first party to support legal recognition of marriage between sexual and gender minority individuals officially. On 15 March 2023, the party released a statement that criticised the BJP-led Union Government's position as a reflection of the Manuwadi worldview, which excludes and criminalises. The statement called on the Supreme Court to uphold the right and dignity of the sexual and gender minority community.

On 22 April 2023, CPI Member of the Council of States Binoy Viswam reiterated the party stands with the democratic rights of the sexual and gender minority community.

==== Lok Janshakti Party ====
Lok Janshakti Party is a state party based in Bihar. On 8 May 2023, Party Vice-president Arvind Kumar Bajpai said that part has not decided on their stance, but they are more likely to oppose it due to social and cultural values.

==== Aam Aadmi Party ====
Aam Aadmi Party is a centrist national party. Delhi Commission for Protection of Child Rights, a statutory body of the Delhi Government under the AAP leadership, intervened to support extending the right to marry and adopt for sexual and gender minority individuals.

==== Naga People's Front ====
Naga People's Front is a state party based in Manipur and Nagaland. On 11 May 2023, Küzholuzo Nienü, party leader and member of Nagaland Legislative Assembly, opposed same-sex marriage. He cautioned the Supreme Court that while society may have "grudgingly" accepted the ruling that decriminalized homosexuality, they would react in an "unsavoury" manner to the legalization of same-sex marriage,

=== Professional associations ===
==== All India Lawyers Association for Justice ====
The All India Lawyers Association for Justice criticised the Bar Council of India's resolution calling the Supreme Court to refer the matter to the Parliament as an endorsement of the doctrine of parliamentary supremacy. The association endorsed constitutional supremacy and Dr Ambedkar's constitutional morality. They expressed that excluding people based on sexual orientation and gender identity is unconstitutional.

==== Bar Council of India ====
The Bar Council of India, a statutory body that regulates the legal practice and legal education, claimed that more than 99.9 per cent of Indians opposed marriage between sexual and gender minority individuals and urged the Supreme Court to leave the matter to the Parliament. The fact-checking website Boomlive reported that the data does not support the BCI claim of over 99.9% against legal recognition of marriage between sexual and gender minority individuals. According to The Wire, Senior Advocate Manan Kumar Mishra, Chairperson of the BCI, joined the Bharatiya Janata Party in January 2014 and has been a vocal supporter.

==== Indian Psychiatric Society ====
On 9 April 2023, the Indian Psychiatric Society, a professional association for Indian psychiatrists affiliated with the World Psychiatric Association, issued a statement asserting that sexual and gender minority identities are natural variations within the range of human sexuality. Stating that there is no evidence to support the exclusion of sexual and gender minority individuals, the Society supported equal rights for sexual and gender minority individuals, including marriage and adoption. The Society cautioned that discrimination leads to mental health issues. The Society acknowledged that the children of same-sex parents might experience discrimination and stigma and urged the sensitize families, schools and communities to prevent stigma and discrimination.

Dr Alka Subramanyam, author of the statement and member of the executive council of the Society, said they reviewed scientific research conducted in countries like the United Kingdom, United States, Netherlands, and Taiwan, where same-sex marriage and adoption by couples from sexual and gender minority communities are recognised.

==== Supreme Court Bar Association ====
Supreme Court Bar Association criticised the Bar Council of India for their "inappropriate" resolution urging the Supreme Court to refer the matter to the Parliament. The Association asserted that the Supreme Court has to hear the petitions and decide whether the Court should adjudicate or refer to the Parliament. President of the Association Vikas Singh said the actions of the Bar Council of India were inappropriate and the proper way would be to intervene and argue the point.

=== Prominent individuals ===
Akkai Padmashali, a sexual and gender minority rights activist, recently wrote an open letter in which she condemned BJP MP Sushil Kumar Modi for his speech opposing legal recognition of marriage between sexual and gender minority individuals in the Council of States. In the letter, she reminded him of Dr. Ambedkar's words that constitutional morality requires cultivation, as it is not a natural sentiment. She also pointed out that the court is duty-bound to apply constitutional morality, not popular morality. As a trans woman, Akkai corrected Modi that the campaign for legal recognition of marriage between sexual and gender minority individuals is led by sexual and gender minority individuals, not left-liberal activists. On 27 January 2023, she filed a petition to join the case.

Ruth Vanita, a feminist critic and literary historian, pointed out that opponents of marriage between sexual and gender minority individuals in India who argue that it goes against Indian culture are ironically borrowing the same argument used by opponents in the West who claimed that it goes against Western culture. As Indian opponents raised the alarm that marriage between sexual and gender minority individuals would cause social havoc, she drew attention to the 31 countries that have recognised the same-sex marriage and did not experience "social havoc".

Onir, a gay filmmaker, said that humanity and equality are more important than the misplaced values of culture and society. Shortcomings of religion, especially those that come from regressive patriarchy, should not stand in the way of progress. Earlier, he criticised the United Hindu Front for protesting against the hearing. He referred to them as a "group of haters" who are "against all minorities" and emphasized that their "viciousness, lack of education, and unemployment" is a terrible combination.

Hansal Mehta, a filmmaker who directed the movie Aligarh based on the life of Ramchandra Siras, an Indian gay professor, recently expressed his support for legal recognition of marriage between sexual and gender minority individuals. Apurva Asrani, an editor and screenwriter who wrote the movie Aligarh, said that ancient Indian texts do not prohibit homosexuality and mention same-sex unions of many gods. The homophobia is a result of colonization and Abrahamic religions.

Bhumi Pednekar, an actress who portrayed the character of a teacher who identifies as a lesbian in the movie Badhaai Do, has identified herself as an ally of the sexual and gender minority community. She said that equality in every aspect of life should be afforded to everyone, regardless of their sexual orientation.

Actress Kangana Ranaut expressed that what a person does in the world defines their identity, not what they do in bed. She said that sexual preferences are private and not to be flaunted as identity cards or medals. She urged acceptance of those who disagree with one's gender identity. However, she counselled against judging people based on physical attributes. She said that people can be whoever they want to be. She encourages individuals to rise above limiting perceptions. Kangana Ranaut suggests parents teach children to see themselves beyond physical attributes and focus on their inner potential. Later, during an interview, she expressed that marriage is a matter of the heart and people's preferences are of no concern once two hearts have met.

Abhijit Ganguly, a comedian, believes that claiming same-sex relationships are against Indian culture is incorrect. He raises the question of whether the blame lies with urban elites who view Indian culture as backward and Western culture as modern or self-appointed dogmatic saviors of Indian culture fixated on their views of right and wrong.

Film director Vivek Ranjan Agnihotri said that Same-sex marriage is not an elitist concept but a human need and right that should be normalized in Indian society. Later, he published an opinion stating that social issues like same-sex marriage are complex and should be addressed by representatives of the people, not the Supreme Court. He argued that the will and the preparedness of society also should be taken into account. If people are not prepared, parliamentarians and the authorities must educate people with facts.

Tehseen Poonawalla, an entrepreneur and anchor, said that marriage to a consenting adult is a fundamental right under Article 21, and society cannot take it away. He said that sexual and gender minority community's right to marry under the special marriage act should be upheld by the Supreme Court. Celina Jaitley, an actress, supported the Indian sexual and gender minority community's fight for the right to life, dignity, and the same opportunities for marriage and family as others. Comedian Vir Das, actress Sumona Chakravarti, and Maanvi Gagroo are among the celebrities who have expressed their hope for the recognition of marriage between sexual and gender minority individuals by the Supreme Court.

=== Religious organisations ===
==== Hinduism ====
RSS is a Hindu nationalist organisation and the ideological parent of Prime Minister Modi's Bharatiya Janata Party. On 14 March 2023, during the press conference at the end of Akhil Bharatiya Pratinidhi Sabha, RSS General Secretary Dattatreya Hosabale backed the BJP-led Union Government's opposition to the extension of the right to marry for sexual and gender minority individuals in India. He said marriage is an institution for the benefit of the family and society, not for physical and sexual enjoyment.

Samvardhinee Nyas, an affiliate of RSS, interviewed persons affiliated with eight branches of medicine ranging from Ayurveda to modern medicine and submitted its finding to support the Union Government's opposition. They claimed that 60% of medical professionals claimed homosexuality was a disorder, 23.58% claimed they had "treated" such persons and "now their life is just like normal people." They reported that 84.27% of the medical professionals opposed legal recognition of marriage between sexual and gender minority individuals, and 67% claimed same-sex parents could not raise their offspring.

On 6 January 2023, the United Hindu Front protested outside the court, decrying homosexuality as against Indian culture and insisting the Supreme Court should not hear the petitions. However, the Supreme Court continued with the hearing.

Shri Sanatam Dharm Pratinidhi Sabha and Akhil Bhartiya Sant Samiti sought to intervene as an opponent to extending the right to marry and establish a family to sexual and gender minority individuals in India. Shri Sanatam Dharm Pratinidhi Sabha relied on Manusmriti and Vedas to oppose the rights. Akhil Bhartiya Sant Samiti argued that the concept of same-sex marriage is going to attack the whole family system in India.

==== Islam ====
Khalid Saifullah Rahmani, General Secretary of the Muslim Personal Law Board, released a statement supporting the Union Government's opposition to extension of the right to marry for sexual and gender minority individuals in India and stated that the Board would try to become a party to the case if necessary. It said that the act of homosexuality and same-sex marriage is contrary to religion, moral values, and social traditions and is unacceptable, illegal and a crime.

On 1 April 2023, Mahmood Asad Madani representing the Jamiat Ulema-e-Hind sought to intervene as an opponent to extending the right to marry and establish a family to sexual and gender minority individuals in India. He noted that the sexual liberation movement, which he alleges of being an atheist movement, resulted in the acceptance of homosexuality. Therefore, it should not be allowed to infringe on the religiously governed personal laws. On 10 April 2023, Telangana Markazi Shia Ulema Council sought to intervene as an opponent to extending the right to marry and establish a family to sexual and gender minority individuals in India. They argued that legitimising same-sex marriage is exclusive to Western and unsuited to Indian society. Marriage is intertwined with religion and personal law. Therefore, it is critical to consider religious perspectives.

Mohammad Salim, Vice President of the Jamaat-e-Islami Hind, backed the Union Government's opposition to extension of the right to marry for sexual and gender minority individuals in India. He said that the organisation believes in fundamental rights and advocates for freedom and minority rights. However, freedom comes with moral responsibility, and no society can accept crimes, vices and anarchy in the name of freedom and personal liberty.

==== Christian ====
Syro-Malabar Catholic Church, a Kerala-based Eastern Catholic Church in full communion with Roman Catholic Church, raised concerns that recognising marriage between sexual and gender minority individuals would lead to demand for legalising paedophilia and bestiality. The Church stated that same-sex marriages are unnatural and do an injustice to the family system in India.

=== Student organization ===
==== Law School Sexual and Gender Minority Collectives ====
Over 30 sexual and gender minority collectives from 36 law schools with more than 600 students condemned the Bar Council of India for the resolution. The students criticised the resolution as ignorant, harmful and antithetical to the Constitution. Expressing concerns about the Bar Council of India disregarding constitutional morality, they reminded them that Indian Constitution is a counterweight to majoritarianism, religious morality, and unjust public opinion.

== Opinions ==
=== Marriage ===
According to a multinational survey conducted in 2023 by the Pew Research Center, 53% of Indians expressed their support for the legal recognition of same-sex marriage, with 28% strongly in favor. Conversely, 43% opposed the legal recognition of same-sex marriage, with 31% strongly opposing it.

According to a multinational survey conducted in 2021 by Ipsos, 44% of Indians expressed support for same-sex marriage, while 18% opposed it. Additionally, 14% indicated support for civil partnerships but not marriage. The survey also revealed that 56% of Indians reported a change in their views on this topic over the past five years.

According to an Indian survey conducted in 2019 by the Mood of the Nation Poll, 62% of Indians expressed opposition to same-sex marriage, while 24% expressed support.

=== Adoption ===
According to a multinational survey conducted in 2021 by Ipsos, 66% of Indians supported the right of same-sex couples to adopt, while 21% expressed opposition. Additionally, 59% of the respondents believed that same-sex couples could be equally successful in raising children, while 26% held a different view.

== See also ==
- LGBT rights in India
- Devu G v. State of Kerala (2023)
- Arun Kumar v. Inspector General of Registration (2019)
- Navtej Singh Johar v. Union of India (2018)
