= Foreign Marriage Act, 1969 =

Indian Marriage Law

Parliament of India
- Long title: An Act to make provision relating to marriages of citizens of India outside India.
- Citation: Act No. 33 of 1969
- Enacted by: Parliament of India
- Enacted: 31 August 1969
- Commenced: 31 August 1969
- Status: In force

The Foreign Marriage Act, 1969 is an Act of the Parliament of India enacted on 31 August 1969. It was enacted due to the recommendations of the Third Law Commission with the object of streamlining the law relating to recognition of marriages solemnized outside India between Indian citizens, or an Indian citizen and a foreign citizen.

== Purpose ==
The main purpose of the act was to recognise the marriage of citizens of India outside India.

== Judicial Review ==
=== Supriyo v. Union of India ===
The petition requested the Supreme Court to recognise the marriage between any two persons, regardless of gender identity and sexual orientation, and declare the notice and objection provisions as void, by enforcing the fundamental rights guaranteed under Articles 14, 15, 19 and 21 of the Indian Constitution.

In October 2020, Vaibhav Jain and Parag Vijay Mehta filed a petition in Delhi High Court and they were joined by other petitioners over the course of time. On 6 January 2023, their petitions were transferred to Supreme Court to be heard along with Supriyo v. Union of India (2023). Additionally, most of the petitioners challenged the notice and objection provisions of the Special Marriage Act of 1954 and the Foreign Marriage Act which hurt vulnerable minorities.
