= G. R. Swaminathan =

Indian Judge

Justice G. R. Swaminathan

Judge of Madras High Court
- Incumbent
- Assumed office 28 June 2017

Personal details
- Born: 1968 (age 57–58)

G. R. Swaminathan is an Indian judge of the Madras High Court. Having been a practicing advocate since 1991, he was appointed as the assistant solicitor general for the Madurai bench of the Madras High Court. He was appointed as an additional judge of the Madras High Court on 28 June 2017, and was later made a permanent judge of the Madras High Court in April 2019.

== Early and personal life ==
G. R. Swaminathan was born in 1968, and did his schooling in Thiruvarur. He completed his Bachelors in Law in 1990. In 2015, he was a part of Hindu Munnani, a hindutva based organisation.

Swaminathan is married to Kamakshi, and the couple have a daughter and a son.

== Career ==
Swaminathan started practicing as an advocate in 1991, and later set up an independent practice in Puducherry in 1997. He relocated to Madurai after the Madurai Bench of the Madras High Court was established in 2004. In 2014, he was appointed as the assistant solicitor general for the Madurai bench of the Madras High Court. He was appointed as an additional judge of the Madras High Court on 28 June 2017, and was appointed as a permanent judge of the Madras High Court in April 2019. In 2019, he reported that he has disposed of 18,944 cases individually and 2,534 cases as part of various benches since his appointment to the High Court. As per statistics provided by the High Court, he had disposed of 52,094 cases till 2025. He is due to retire from service on 31 May 2030.

=== Cases ===
LGBT rights case (2019)

In 2019, Swaminathan was the sitting judge on the Arun Kumar v. Inspector General of Registration case. The judgement recognised a trans woman as a "bride" within the meaning of the Hindu Marriage Act 1955 and prohibited genital-normalizing surgery for intersex infants and children except on life-threatening situations. The verdict was cited in multiple court cases including the case on recognition of same sex marriage in the Supreme Court of India. The judgement was cited in a office of the United Nations High Commissioner for Human Rights report, and was highlighted in the intersex legal mapping report released by the International Lesbian, Gay, Bisexual, Trans and Intersex Association in 2023.

Maridhas sedition case (2021)

In December 2021, when Swaminathan dismissed a sedition case against Youtuber Maridhas, he was targeted by a section of social media users for his supposed right wing affiliations. They pointed to his alleged participation in an event organised by the Bharatiya Janata Party (BJP) in 2016, and his appearance in defence of Jayendra Saraswati of the Kanchi Mutt in a case against the state government as evidence of his inclinations. However, critics and lawyers pointed out that the judgement was based on technical grounds, and has precedence in similar cases in the past. They also argued that Swaminathan appeared as a counsel in defence of Perumal Murugan, in a case against the release of his book Madhorubagan by Hindutva organisations.

Passport case (2022)

In July 2022, Swaminathan lauded BJP leader K. Annamalai during a court case regarding the issuance of passports to people using forged documents. Later, a lawyer representing International Association of Democratic Lawyers, wrote to the chief justice of the Madras High Court, demanding the dismissal of Swaminathan, based on the premise that the court must be impartial and cannot endorse any political party, and asserted that Swaminathan's continued position is a threat to the autonomy of the judiciary as it would instil fear among people to express concerns against the BJP.

Vanchinathan case (2025)

In July 2025, Vanchinathan, the Tamil Nadu coordinator for the People's Rights Protection Centre, sent a letter to the chief justice of India detailing 15 accusations against Swaminathan including a preferential treatment, caste prejudice, and political partisanship against advocates from a particular community, and right-wing ideologues. The letter further said that this caused unease and concern among lawyers, especially those from marginalized communities, and called on the Supreme Court to launch a formal investigation, arguing that the judge's conduct was blurring the boundary between impartial judging and ideological activism.

Taking cognisance of the allegations, a two judge bench consisting of judges Swaminathan, and K Rajasekar, initiated suo moto proceedings against Vanchinathan. The judges considered the letter contemptuous and ordered Vanchinathan to appear on court 28 July 2025, to declare his position on the same. A section of lawyers and activists raised concerns about how the judges obtained access to a confidential letter intended solely for the Supreme Court, and organised demonstrations in support of Vanchinathan. Eight former judges of the Madras High Court urged the judges to abandon the proposed contempt proceedings against Vanchinathan, asserting that lodging a complaint against a judge does not constitute contempt of court. At his appearance at the court, as Vanchinathan declined to provide an oral response and instead demanded a formal written directive from the bench, Swaminathan is said to have called him a "comedy piece" and labeled him as a "coward".

Vedic conference (2025)

In the 17th annual talent parade of Vedic scholars held in Chennai on 30 July 2025, Swaminatan recounted a case from his days as a practicing lawyer. He said that he helped overturn the conviction of his friend, a Vedic scholar, who had falsely confessed to have caused a fatal accident to protect his sister, who had actually caused the accident that resulted in a death of a man. He said that though his friend was convicted by a lower court, he was acquitted by a higher court as none of the eyewitnesses identified him as the driver. He described the outcome as an example of "If you protect the Vedas, Vedas protect you" and called it a turning point in his spiritual outlook. The speech attracted attention against the backdrop of a separate controversy, where an advocate accused him of caste bias, prompting the Madras High Court to refer the matter to the chief justice.

Tirupparankundram case (2025)

In December 2025, Swaminathan was the hearing judge in a case that involved the lighting up of a lamp on a pillar atop the hillock at Tirupparankundram during the Karthigai Deepam festival. He permitted the lighting of a lamp on the pillar additionally based on an individual petition, while the authorities of the Subramaniya Swamy Temple had lighted the lamp at a different location over the years. The state government appealed against the judgement, stating that the judgement changed a longs standing practice, and contributed to a precarious law and order situation. The judgement, and the failure to implement the same by the government, subsequently led to various protests, counter protests, contempt of court cases, and further appeals by the state government in the Supreme Court.

On the backdrop of Swaminathan's judgement on the Tirupparankundram case, on 9 December 2025, around 120 members of parliament from the opposition bloc submitted an impeachment motion against Swaminathan to Om Birla, the Speaker of the Lok Sabha. They accused Swaminathan of partiality towards lawyers from a particular community, especially those hailing from the Brahmin caste, and those associated with right-wing political ideologies, and asserted that such conduct violated the secular tenets embedded in the Constitution of India. On 12 December 2025, 56 former judges of the Supreme Court issued an open letter expressing their opposition to the impeachment motion, and urging the parliamentarians to withdraw the motion. They called it a "brazen attempt to browbeat judges who do not fall in line with ideological and political expectations of a particular section of society", and if this is allowed to continue, "it will cut at the very roots of our democracy and the independence of the judiciary". On 20 December, another 36 former judges issued an open statement in support of Swaminathan, and urged the parliamentarians to reject the motion.
