= Deepika Singh v. Central Administrative Tribunal =

Indian Case Law

- Court: Supreme Court of India
- Full case name: Deepika Singh v. Central Administrative Tribunal & Ors.
- Decided: 16 August 2022
- Citation: C.A. No 5308/2022

Court membership
- Judges sitting: D. Y. Chandrachud, J.; and A. S. Bopanna, J.

Case opinions
- Atypical families are deserving of equal protection under law and benefits available under social welfare legislation.
- Decision by: D. Y. Chandrachud and A. S. Bopanna

Deepika Singh v. Central Administrative Tribunal & Ors. (2022) is a landmark decision of the Supreme Court of India that widens the definition of 'family' under Indian law.

== Background ==
Deepika Singh, who worked as a nurse at a government medical institute, Postgraduate Institute of Medical Education and Research (PGIMER) in Chandigarh, was denied her application for maternity leave after she gave birth. The employer stated they denied her maternity leave because she had previously taken maternity leave to care for her husband's children from a previous marriage. The two children belonged to her husband's first marriage.

Her request for an allowance under the 2013 Central Civil Service Rules' provisions for maternity leave was denied by the Central Administrative Tribunal and the Punjab and Haryana High Court.

== Judgment ==
The Supreme Court held that a woman's statutory right to take maternity leave cannot be restricted because she previously used child care leave for her non-biological children.

While ruling in favor of the petitioner, Justice Chandrachud and Justice Bopanna noted that the predominant understanding of the concept of a "family" both in the law and in society ignores both, the many circumstances which may lead to a change in one‟s familial structure, and the fact that many families do not conform to this expectation to begin with.

Familial relationships may take the form of domestic, unmarried partnerships or queer relationships. A household may be a single parent household for any number of reasons, including the death of a spouse, separation, or divorce. Similarly, the guardians and caretakers (who traditionally occupy the roles of the "mother" and the "father") of children may change with remarriage, adoption, or fostering. These manifestations of love and of families may not be typical but they are as real as their traditional counterparts.

— Justice D. Y. Chandrachud and Justice A. S. Bopanna, Paragraph 26, Page Number 19-20

Further, the Justices note that such atypical families are deserving of equal protection under law guaranteed in the Article 14 of the Indian Constitution and benefits available under social welfare legislation.

== Significance ==
The ruling expands the definition of “family” in Indian law to include unmarried partnerships, queer relationships, and single-parent families.

== See also ==
- LGBT rights in India
- Navtej Singh Johar v. Union of India (2018)
- Justice K. S. Puttaswamy (Retd.) vs Union Of India (2017)
- National Legal Services Authority v. Union of India (2014)
