= Arun Kumar v. Inspector General of Registration =

Indian LGBT Rights Case Law

- Court: Madras High Court
- Full case name: Arun kumar & Anr. versus Inspector General of Registration & Ors.
- Decided: 22 April 2019
- Citation: W. P. (MD) No. 4125 of 2019

Court membership
- Judge sitting: Justice G. R. Swaminathan

Case opinions
- A trans woman is a "bride" within the meaning of the Hindu Marriage Act of 1955; Genital-normalizing surgery (referred to as sex reassignment surgery in the case) for intersex children except on life-threatening situations are prohibited.
- Decision by: Justice G. R. Swaminathan

Keywords
- Transgender Rights, Intersex Rights, Queer Relationships, Queer Marriages

Arun Kumar & Anr. versus Inspector General of Registration & Ors. (2019) is a landmark judgement of the Madras High Court which recognised trans woman as a "bride" within the meaning of the Hindu Marriage Act 1955 and prohibited genital-normalizing surgery (referred to as sex reassignment surgery in the case) for intersex infants and children except on life-threatening situations.

The Supreme Court of India highlighted the case in its publication titled "Sensitisation Module for the Judiciary on LGBTIQA+ Community" as one of the High Court judgments that effectively addressed the difficulties and obstacles experienced by queer individuals within the justice system due to their systemic marginalization.

== Background ==
On 31 November 2018, Arun Kumar married his wife, Srija, a transgender woman, in a traditional Hindu ceremony at the Arulmighu Sankara Rameswara temple in Tuticorin; the couple subsequently sought to register their marriage with the Joint Registrar at Tuticorin under the Hindu Marriage Act 1955. The registrar refused to enter the marriage into the Tamil Nadu marriage registry on the basis that the marriage was prohibited, as under the Hindu Marriage Act, a marriage is conducted between a "bride" and a "groom"; the registrar indicated that Srija was not a "bride" within the meaning of the act. The couple thus filed suit in the Madras High Court seeking an order from the court compelling the Registrar to enroll their marriage.

== Proceedings ==
The Madurai Bench of the Madras High Court was asked to consider whether the term ‘bride’ could include transgender women, within the meaning of Section 5 of the Hindu Marriage Act 1955. The petitioners further asked the court to consider whether the refusal to register the marriage of a person based on sexual orientation or gender identity violates the right to equality before the law, freedom of speech and expression, protection of life and personal liberty and freedom of conscience and free profession, practice and propagation of religion guaranteed under the Constitution of India.

During the proceedings, the Bench was made aware that Srija was born with an intersex variation, but the school records identified her as male. Additionally, through Intersex activist Gopi Shankar, the Bench was made aware that the Ministry of Health and Family Welfare regulates medical procedures, including sex reassignment surgeries, for intersex children only after a thorough assessment of the patient and obtaining written consent from the parent or guardian.

== Opinion of the Court ==
=== Right to Marry for Transgender Persons ===
The court observed that the Universal Declaration of Human Rights provides for the right to marry and family life. The court noted the Supreme Court's verdict in Puttaswamy v. Union of India (2017), which highlighted the contradiction in recognising the right to privacy in different aspects of family life but excluding it for the decision to enter into relationships— the foundational part of family life. The court relied on the Supreme Court's ruling in Shafin Jahan v. Ashokan J.M.(2018), which recognized the right to choose a marital partner as a Constitutional right. Furthermore, the court relied on the Supreme Court's decision in NLSA v. Union of India (2014), which recognised the right to marry for a transgender person.

The court relied on the NLSA v. Union of India (2014), which held that "self-determination of gender is an integral part of personal autonomy and self-expression and falls within the realm of personal liberty guaranteed under Article 21 of the Constitution of India." Therefore, the court held that under Section 5 of the Hindu Marriage Act of 1955, transgender women are recognized as "brides" based on their self-identification as women, meaning that those who perceive themselves as women are legally considered as such.

The court held that while Parliament may not have considered that trans women would fall under the Act, "The expression “bride”...cannot have a static or immutable meaning. As noted in Justice G.P. Singh's Principles of Statutory Interpretation, the court is free to apply the current meaning of a statute to present day conditions."

Consequently, the court held that the marriage between Arun Kumar and Srija, being validly conducted, must be considered a lawful marriage insofar as failure to do so would violate Srija's constitutional rights. The court issued the writ sought by the couple, ordering the Registrar to enroll their marriage.

=== Prohibition of Genital Surgery for Intersex Children ===
During the proceedings, the Court was made aware that the Ministry of Health and Family Welfare regulates medical procedures, including sex reassignment surgeries, for intersex children only after a thorough assessment of the patient and obtaining written consent from the parent or guardian.

The court relied on the Supreme Court's verdict in NLSA v. Union of India (2014), which established that individuals cannot be compelled to undergo medical procedures, such as gender-affirming surgery (referred to as sex reassignment surgery in the case), sterilization, or hormonal therapy, in order to obtain legal recognition of their gender identity. The court noted that the World Health Organization issued a report titled "Sexual Health, Human Rights and the Law," advocating for delaying genital-normalizing surgery until intersex children reach an age where they can independently make decisions. The court relied on the Madras High Court's ruling in S. Amutha v. C. Manivanna Bhupathy to hold that the consent of the parent cannot be considered as the consent of the child.

Furthermore, the court highlighted Article 39(f) of the Constitution of India, which declares, "the State shall, in particular, direct its policy towards securing that children are given opportunities and facilities to develop in a healthy manner and in conditions of freedom and dignity and that childhood and youth are protected against exploitation and against moral and material abandonment."

Therefore, the court directed the State Government of Tamil Nadu to prohibit genital-normalizing surgery (referred to as sex reassignment surgery in the case) for intersex infants and children except on life-threatening situations.

== Compliance ==
On 13 August 2019, Department of Health and Family Welfare, a department of State Government of Tamil Nadu, issued an order banning genital-normalizing surgery (referred to as sex reassignment surgery in the case) for intersex infants and children except on life-threatening situations. The order stipulates that exceptions in cases of life-threatening circumstances will be granted by the government, following the recommendation of a committee formed by the Director of Medical Education, which must include the following members:

- A Pediatric Surgeon or Urologist.
- An Endocrinologist.
- A Social Worker, Psychology Worker, or Intersex Activist.
- A Government Representative holding the rank of Under-Secretary to the Government or higher.

In addition to Madras High Court's direction in the current case, the Department of Health and Family Welfare issued its order based on the Supreme Court's ruling in NLSA v. Union of India (2014), the World Health Organization's report titled "Sexual Health, Human Rights and the Law," and expert opinions provided by the Head of the Department of Plastic, Reconstructive, and Facio-Maxillary Surgery at Rajiv Gandhi Government General Hospital.

== Impact ==
Tamil Nadu holds the distinction of being the first in Asia and the second worldwide, following Malta, to prohibit the practice of performing genital-normalizing surgeries on intersex infants and children.

The Supreme Court featured the case in its "Sensitisation Module for the Judiciary on LGBTIQA+ Community" as a significant High Court judgment addressing the legal challenges faced by LGBTQ+ citizens. The publication highlighted the court's focus gender self-identification as the relevant factor in determining the legal treatment of marriages. It also noted that by ordering that the marriage between a cisgender man and a transgender woman be recognized, the Court included transgender people in the legal conception of marriage, traditionally confined to unions including two cisgender persons.

== See also ==
- LGBT Rights in India
- Supriyo v. Union of India (2023)
- Chinmayee Jena v. State of Odisha (2020)
- National Legal Services Authority v. Union of India (2014)
