= J. B. Pardiwala =

Indian judge (born 1965)

Hon'ble Justice J. B. Pardiwala
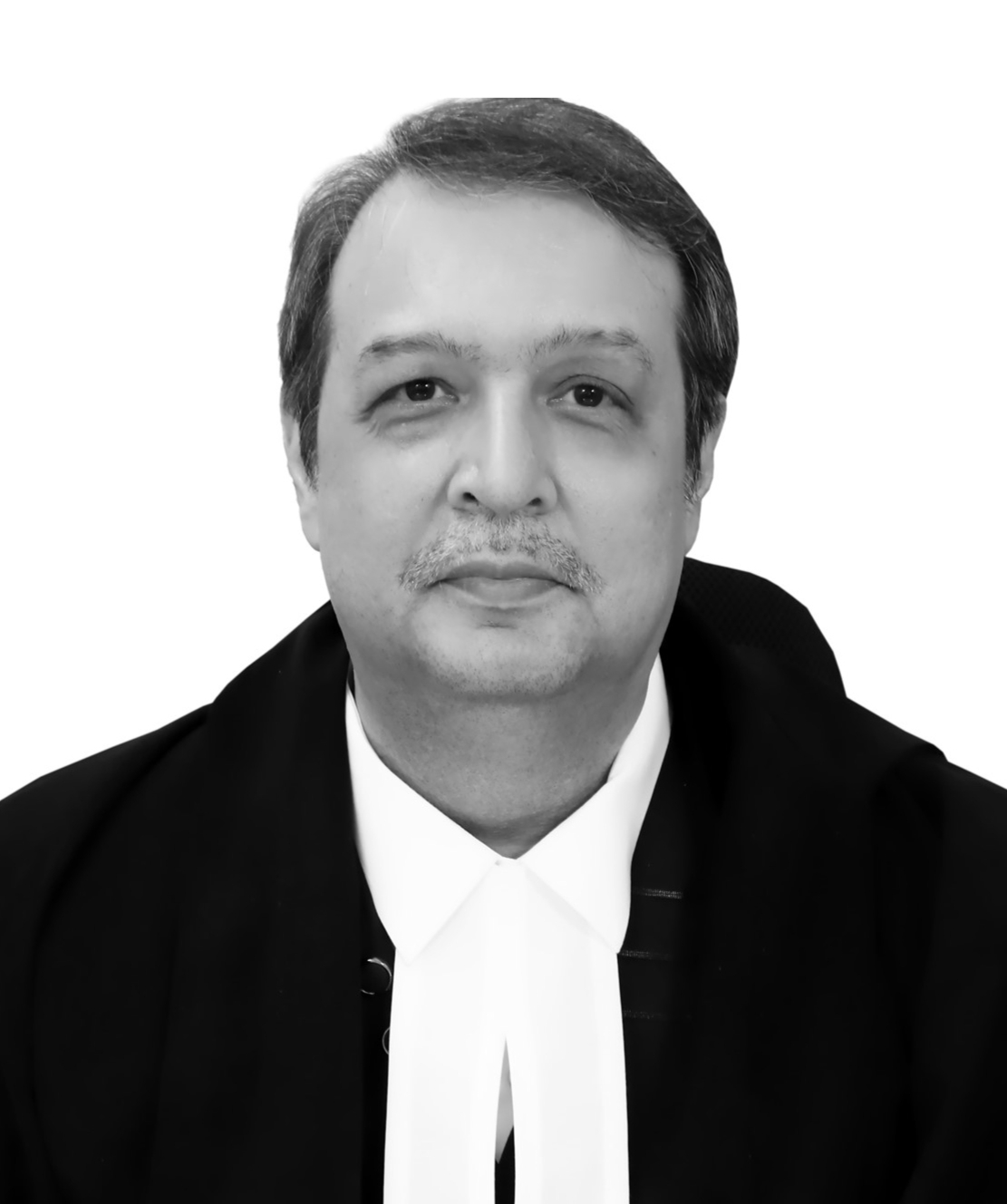

Judge of the Supreme Court of India
- Incumbent
- Assumed office 9 May 2022
- Nominated by: N. V. Ramana
- Appointed by: Ram Nath Kovind

Judge of the Gujarat High Court
- In office 17 February 2011 – 8 May 2022
- Nominated by: S. H. Kapadia
- Appointed by: Pratibha Patil

Personal details
- Born: 12 August 1965 (age 61) Bombay, India
- Education: K. M. Law College, Valsad
- Website: www.sci.gov.in

Jamshed Burjor Pardiwala (born 12 August 1965) is an Indian jurist who has been serving as a judge of the Supreme Court of India since May 2022. He is a former judge of the Gujarat High Court and is in line to become the Chief Justice of India (CJI) in May 2028. If he does become the CJI, he is expected to serve a term of 2 years and 3 months.

== Early life and career ==
Jamshed Burjor Pardiwala was born on 12 August 1965 in Bombay, into a family of lawyers. His father, Burjor Cawasji Pardiwala, was a third-generation lawyer and served as a member of the Gujarat Legislative Assembly from the Congress party.

Pardiwala studied at St. Joseph's E. T. High School in Valsad, Gujarat. He completed his degree in Law from K.M. Law College, Valsad, in 1988 and started practice at Valsad in 1989. He was elected as a member of the Bar Council of Gujarat from 1994 to 2000. He has also worked as a member of the Gujarat High Court Legal Services Authority.

== Judicial career ==
=== Gujarat High Court ===
Pardiwala was appointed as an additional judge of the Gujarat High Court on 17 February 2011 and was made permanent judge on 28 January 2013. He served in the Gujarat High Court until May 2022. During this period, he has also served as the President of the Gujarat State Judicial Academy.

=== Supreme Court of India ===
He was elevated as judge of the Supreme Court of India on 9 May 2022. He was part of the majority of the Constitution bench which upheld the 103rd Constitutional amendment of EWS reservation. He remarked, "Reservation cannot go on for an indefinite period". This judgement of the Supreme Court has been criticized by some. He is in line to become the Chief Justice of India in May 2028 and is expected to serve for a term of 2 years and 3 months.
