= P. S. Narasimha =

Judge of Supreme Court of India

Hon'ble Justice Pamidighantam Sri Narasimha
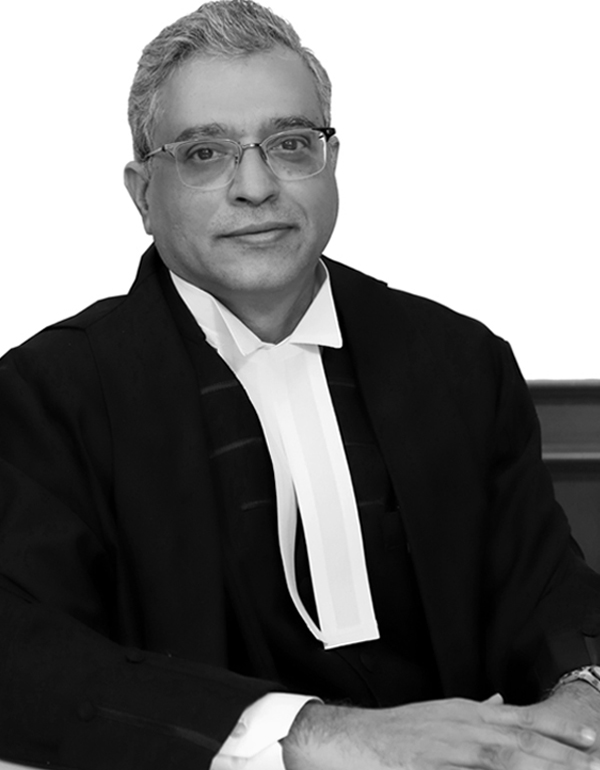

Judge of the Supreme Court of India
- Incumbent
- Assumed office 31 August 2021
- Nominated by: N. V. Ramana
- Appointed by: Ram Nath Kovind

Additional Solicitor General of India
- In office May 2014 – 15 December 2018
- Appointed by: Pranab Mukherjee

Personal details
- Born: 3 May 1963 (age 63) Hyderabad
- Education: B.A. and LL.B
- Alma mater: Nizam College Hyderabad; Faculty of Law, University of Delhi

Pamidighantam Sri Narasimha (born 3 May 1963) is a judge of the Supreme Court of India. He is a former Additional Solicitor General of India. He is well known for his work on the Ayodhya Title Dispute and the BCCI cases.

== Early life and education ==
Narasimha was born and brought up in Hyderabad. He graduated from Nizam College, Hyderabad with Bachelor of Arts degree in Economics, Political Science and Public Administration. He completed his Bachelor of Laws from Faculty of Law, University of Delhi in 1998. His father P. Kodanda Ramayya was former judge of Andhra Pradesh High Court and legal writer. His older brother P Sri Raghuram is a designated senior advocate practicing in Hyderabad.

== Career ==
In 1988 he enrolled as advocate and started practice in Andhra Pradesh High Court. Narasimha then moved to New Delhi to practice at the Supreme Court. He was the member of the Supreme Court Legal Aid Committee. He was named Senior Advocate in 2008 and was appointed as Additional Solicitor General of India in 2014.

In August 2021 he became a judge of the Supreme Court and is in line to become the 56th Chief Justice of India, if the convention of seniority is followed. On 29 June 2026 he became the member of five member supreme court collegium upon retirement of J. K. Maheshwari.
