= Akkai Padmashali =

Indian transgender activist

- Born: Bangalore, India (age 38 years)
- Occupations: Transgender rights activist; singer
- Awards: Karnataka Rajyotsava Award

Akkai Padmashali is an Indian transgender activist, motivational speaker, and singer. For her work in activism, she has received the Rajyotsava Prashasti, the second highest civilian honor of the state of Karnataka, and an honorary doctorate from the Indian Virtual University for Peace and Education. She is also the first transgender person in Karnataka to register their marriage.

== Early life and career ==
Padmashali is from Bangalore. Her father was in the airforce and her mother is a homemaker. Padmashali tried her best to conform to her assigned male gender role, culminating in a suicide attempt at the age of 12. Gradually, she disclosed to her brother about her gender identity. While travelling to school, she would watch trans women near Cubbon Park, Bangalore and she wanted to be like them. She spoke in an interview about how her parents would get angry and chide her every time she used to wear her sister's clothes or play with girls, which resulted in making her childhood a really confused one. It was her brother who tried to convince their parents, who refused to understand and accept the way she is. They would take her to doctors and other specialists. Padmashali had to drop her studies after tenth grade. Later, she was forced to go into sex work, which she continued for four years. That's when she got in touch with other transgender persons and was able to empathize with their experiences.

In an interview, Padmashali said, "I did not choose to become an anti-social element or unwanted person to the society. My fight was for 'Acceptance and Social Inclusion', for the transformation and the discrimination against biological sex which was with me since birth." Padmashali, in the company of other trans persons, realized that government policies weren't in favor of the transgender community and they face harsh inequality on various circumstances.

On 1 November 2017 when former US President Barack Obama came for his visit to India, Akkai Padmashali was the first trans woman to be invited to be a part of the Town Hall. She had been invited to the White House prior to this in 2015, but at that time she could not attend.

She is the first transgender person in the country who got a driving license stating her gender as female. Padmashali was also invited by the President of India to attend the swearing-in ceremony of the CJI of India. She is married to her long time partner, Vasu, a trans man. Padmashali is the first transgender person in Karnataka to register their marriage in Karnataka.

== Activism ==
Padmashali started her career of activism at Sangama, an LGBT Right group based out of Bangalore where she was motivated to inspire many more minds. Since then she has been fighting a battle for ensuring dignity and rights of transgender persons as well sexual minority. She felt that the draconian law of Section 377 of Indian Penal Code should be abolished, because she had been abused and violated by police on multiple occasions under this law. Police, in multiple instances would force sex from transgender persons or threaten, malign or abuse them. She founded the organization named ‘Ondede’, a human rights organization to advocate the rights of children, women and sexual minorities.

Padmashali has filed a petition in the Supreme Court of India against Section 377 stating that the colonial law is violative of the constitutional rights as well as the 2014 NALSA judgment. She was against the centre's proposed Transgender Persons (Protection of Rights) Bill 2017. In an interview, Padmashali said that she would prefer being called a woman, not a trans woman.

Padmashali has spoken out about the impacts of gentrification in Bangalore on sex workers and the LGBT community, specifically the increased prices, criminalization, and barred entry to public spaces such as Cubbon Park.

== Publications ==
- A small step in a long journey: a memoir, by Akkai Padmashali; as told to Gowri Vijayakumar. New Delhi : Zubaan, 2022. ISBN 9789390514793
