= Delhi Commission for Protection of Child Rights =

The Delhi Commission for Protection of Child Rights (DCPCR) is a statutory body established under the Commission for Protection of Child Rights (CPCR) Act, 2005. The Commission is under the Government of Delhi and is headed currently by Chairperson Anurag Kundu.

== Activities ==
The Commission is entrusted with matters on child rights including protection of children from cruelty, abuse, exploitation, substance abuse, disability discrimination, and their right to education, health, play, and enforcement of legal protection.

- DCPCR launched Child Rights Fellowship in collaboration with Ashoka University
- DCPCR is launching an International Journal of Child Rights with Justice Madan Lokur as chairperson of its advisory board.

== Current members ==
- Chairperson: Mr. Anurag Kundu
- Member Secretary: Shri. Rakesh Bhatnagar
- Members
1. Ranjana Prasad
2. Nidhi Dwivedi
3. Neeraj Kumar Pandey
4. Nitin Tyagi
5. Abhinandita Dayal Mathur

== See also ==
- National Commission for Protection of Child Rights
