= Central Adoption Resource Authority =

Statutory body of Ministry of Women & Child Development, India

Central Adoption Resource Authority (CARA) is an autonomous and statutory body of Ministry of Women and Child Development in the Government of India. It was set up in 1990. It is a statutory body under Juvenile Justice (Care and Protection of Children) Act, 2015. It functions as the nodal body for the adoption of Indian children and is mandated to monitor and regulate in-country and inter-country adoptions. CARA is designated as the Central Authority to deal with inter-country adoptions in accordance with the provisions of the 1993 Hague Convention on Inter-country Adoption, ratified by Government of India in 2003.

India has multiple adoption laws. Traditionally, the 1956 Hindu Adoption and Maintenance Act (HAMA), adoption, subject to the requirements and rigors of the Act, is available in India to Hindus, Buddhists, Jains, and Sikhs, and others subject to Hindu family law or custom. For others, the 1890 Guardians and Wards Act applies, but which provides only guardianship, not adoption, for those not subject to Hindu family law or custom. CARA primarily deals with the adoption of "orphaned, abandoned and surrendered" children through recognised adoption agencies. In 2018, CARA has allowed individuals in a live-in relationship to adopt children from and within India.

== Preference Controversy ==
As required by the 1993 Hague Convention, Article 4(b), children residing in India are always offered to Indian families before any foreigner. However, after taking office in 2014, Prime Minister of India Narendra Modi changed the law to put Non-Resident Indian (NRI) citizens and couples on par with Indians residing in India. From this point on, all adoptable children are offered to Indian families in order of seniority instead of distinguishing between resident and non-resident Indians. Foreigners residing outside of India must adopt a child from the Immediate Placement list, which only contains children who have been passed over by Indian families (including children who are above 5 years, sibling groups, and children with health ailments or disabilities). However, there is a lot of misunderstanding by prospective adoptive parents in India who believe that foreigners get priority in choosing children. In fact, the number of children being adopted by foreigners has risen because more foreigners are adopting disabled children older than 6 years. Foreigners residing in India may adopt through CARA if they can provide a No Objection Certificate from their country of citizenship; this prevents adopted children being abandoned if the foreigner is removed from India.
