= G. S. Bajpai =

Indian legal education administrator

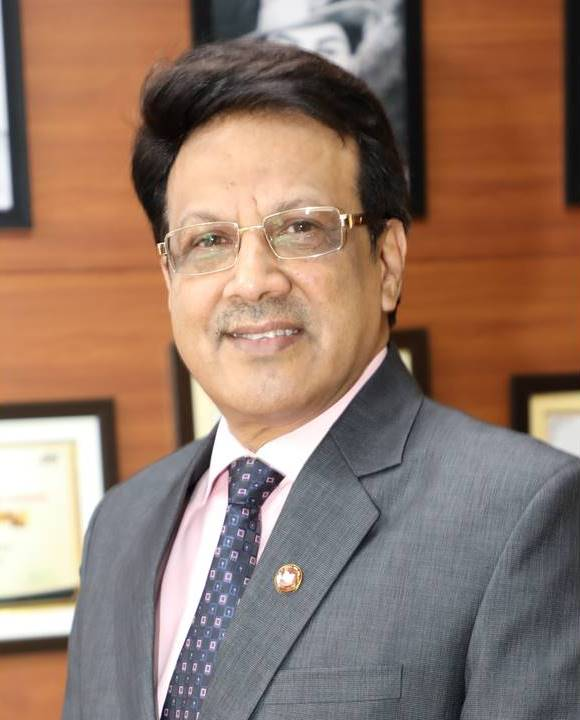
- Vice Chancellor, National Law University Delhi
- Incumbent
- Assumed office 28 Feb 2023

Personal details
- Occupation: Professor, Vice-Chancellor
- Profession: Teaching, administration
- Website: https://profgsbajpai.in

G.S. Bajpai is an Indian professor and the incumbent Vice-Chancellor of National Law University Delhi. He was the former Registrar of the National Law University Delhi from September 2014 - May 2021. He was subsequently appointed as the Vice-Chancellor of Rajiv Gandhi National University of Law and served in the position till February 2023.

== Career ==
Bajpai, serves as Professor of Criminology & Criminal Justice; Chair Professor at K.L Arora Chair in Criminal Law at National Law University, Delhi and also as the chairperson at the Centre for Criminology & Victimology. He is also the Vice Chancellor, National Law University, Delhi. Before this, he was serving (2007–2011) as Professor & Chairperson at the Centre for Criminal Justice Administration, National Law Institute University, Bhopal (MP). He also had positions at the Indian Institute of Public Administration, (1989) Bureau of Police Research and Development, (1989– 1995) Punjab Police Academy, Punjab and Department of Criminology & Forensic Science, University of Saugar, M.P. He did his post-doctorate study (2004) as Commonwealth Fellow at the Department of Criminology, Leicester University, U.K.

== Books ==
- Bajpai, G.S. (2019). Juvenile Justice: Impact and Implementation in India. Bloomsbury India. ISBN 978-9388414630.
- "Asserting Gender through Narratives about Violence", Preventing Youth Violence, Palgrave Macmillan, 2014, doi:10.1057/9781137365699.0010, ISBN 978-1-137-36569-9
- Bajpai, G. S. (18 October 2019). Juvenile Justice: Impact and Implementation in India. Bloomsbury Publishing. ISBN 978-93-88414-65-4.
- Bajpai, G. S. (1999). China's Shadow Over Sikkim: The Politics of Intimidation. Lancer Publishers. ISBN 978-1-897829-52-3.
- Bajpai, G. S. (2017). Pre-trial Process and Policing: Case Analysis & Judicial Discourse. NLUD Press. ISBN 978-93-84272-12-8.
- Bajpai, G. S. (1997). Victim in the Criminal Justice Process: Perspective on Police and Judiciary. Uppal Publishing House. ISBN 978-81-85565-87-3.
- Bajpai, G. S. (August 2011). Witness and the Criminal Justice System: Researching Consequences of Being a Witness. LAP Lambert Acad. Publ. ISBN 978-3-8443-8630-1.
