= Article 14 of the Constitution of India =

Provides equality before the law, equal protection

Article 14 of the Constitution of India provides for equality before the law or equal protection of the laws within the territory of India. It states:

"The State shall not deny to any person equality before the law or the equal protection of the laws within the territory of India."

== Reasonable Classification and Non-Arbitrariness ==
Article 14 guarantees equality to all persons (Note: General Clauses Act, 1897, Section 3, clause 42 defines person to include any company or association or body of individuals, whether incorporated or not.), including citizens, corporations, and foreigners. Its provisions have come up for discussion in the Supreme Court in a number of cases and the case of Ram Krishna Dalmia v. Justice S R Tendolkar reiterated its meaning and scope as follows. Article 14 permits classification, so long as it is 'reasonable', but forbids class legislation. A classification of groups of people is considered reasonable when:

1. The classification is based upon intelligible differentia that distinguishes persons or things that are grouped from others that are left out of the group, and,
2. The differential has a rational relation with the objective of the act.

In addition, the classification must be non-arbitrary. Supreme Court in E. P. Royappa (1973) provided guidance on arbitrariness of an act:

"Equality is a dynamic concept with many aspects and dimensions and it cannot be ‘cribbed, cabined and confined’ within the traditional and doctrinaire limits. From the positivistic point of view, equality is antithetic to arbitrariness. In fact, equality and arbitrariness are sworn enemies… Where an act is arbitrary, it is implicit that it is unequal both according to political logic and constitutional law and is therefore violative of Article 14."
