= Anglo-Hindu law =

Laws enacted during the British colonial era

Anglo-Hindu law is the case law that developed in British India, through the interpretation of the Hindu scriptures and customary law in the British courts.

The first phase of Anglo-Hindu law started in 1772, and lasted till 1864, during which translations of ancient Indian texts along with textual interpretations provided by court-appointed Hindu Pandits were the basis of jurisprudence. During the same period, the Anglo-Muslim law for Indian Muslims was similarly extracted from Quran with interpretation provided by Muslim Qadis. The second phase of Anglo-Hindu law started in 1864, when the Hindu Pandits along with Muslim Qadis were dismissed due to growing inconsistencies in interpretation of texts and suspicions of corruption. The existing case law, along with textbooks that systematised it, were used for jurisprudence. The Anglo-Hindu law was also extended and modified by a series of Acts between 1828 and 1947, which were based on political consensus rather than religious texts.

== History ==
In 18th century, the British East India Company, which started out as an agent of the Mughal emperor, soon took over the political and administrative powers in India, it was faced with various state responsibilities such as legislative and judiciary functions. The administration pursued a path of least resistance, relying upon co-opted local intermediaries that were mostly Muslims and some Hindus in various princely states. The British exercised power by avoiding interference and adapting to law practices as explained by the local intermediaries. The colonial state thus sustained what were essentially pre-colonial religious and political laws for resolving conflicts, well into the late nineteenth century.

That in all suits regarding inheritance, marriage, caste and other religious usages or institutions, the law of the Koran with respect to Mahometans [Muslims], and those of the Shaster [Shastra] with respect to Gentoos [Hindus] shall be invariably be adhered to.

— Warren Hastings, August 15, 1772

For Muslims of India, the code of Muslim law was readily available in al-Hidaya and Fatawa-i Alamgiri written under the sponsorship of Aurangzeb. For Hindus and other non-Muslims, this information was unavailable. The British colonial officials, for practice, attempted to extract from the Dharmaśāstra, the English categories of law and religion for the purposes of colonial administration.

The early period of Anglo-Hindu Law (1772–1828) was structured along the lines of Muslim law practice. It included the extracted portions of law from one Dharmaśāstra by British-appointed scholars (especially Sir William Jones, Henry Thomas Colebrooke, Sutherland, and Borrodaile) in a manner similar to Islamic al-Hidaya and Fatawa-i Alamgiri. It also included the use of court pandits in British courts to aid the British judges in interpreting Shastras just like Qadis (Maulavis) for interpreting the Islamic law.

The arrival of William Bentinck as the Governor-General of British India in 1828, marked a shift towards universal civil code, whose administration emphasised preference for the same law for all human beings, individualism and equal treatment to help liberate, empower and end social practices among Hindus and Muslims of India that had received much public coverage in Britain through the publications of Christian missionaries and individuals such as Thomas Macaulay.

Governor-General Dalhousie, in 1848, extended this trend and stated his policy that the law must "treat all natives much the same manner". Over time, between 1828-1855, a series of British acts of Parliament were passed to revise the Anglo-Hindu and Anglo-Muslim laws, such as those relating to the right to religious conversion, widow remarriage, and right to create wills for inheritance. In 1832, the British colonial government abolished accepting religious fatwa as a source of law. In 1835, the British began creating a criminal code that would codify the existing criminal code which was a complex conflicting mixture of laws derived from Muslim texts (Quran) and Hindu texts (Shastras), and this common criminal code was ready by 1855. These changes were welcomed by Hindu law reform movement, but considered abrogating religion-defined rules within the Muslim law. The changes triggered discontent, call for jihad and religious war, and became partly responsible for the 1857 Indian revolt against the British rule.

In 1864, after the East India Company was dissolved and India became a formal part of the British Empire, Anglo-Hindu law entered into a second phase (1864–1947), one in which British colonial courts in India relied less on the Muslim Qadis and Hindu Pandits for determining the respective religious laws, and relied more on a written law. A universal criminal code for India was adopted in 1864, the expanded to include procedural and commercial code by 1882, which overruled pre-existing Anglo-Hindu and Anglo-Muslim laws. However, the personal laws for Muslims remained sharia-based, while the Anglo-Hindu law was enacted independent of any text on matters such as marriage, divorce, inheritance and the Anglo-Hindu law covered all Hindus, Jains, Sikhs and Buddhists in India. The British crown enacted The Indian Christian Marriage Act, 1872 which covered marriage, divorce and alimony laws for Indian Christians of all denominations except the Roman Catholics.

The development of legal pluralism, that is separate law based on individual's religion was controversial in India, from the very start.

== Sources of Anglo-Hindu law ==
John Mayne, in 1910, wrote that the classical Hindu law has the oldest pedigree of any known system of jurisprudence. Mayne noted that while being ancient, the conflicting texts on almost every question presents a great difficulty in deciding what the classical Hindu law was. As more literature emerges, and is translated or interpreted, Mayne noted that the conflict between the texts on every matter of law has multiplied, and that there is a lack of consensus between the Western legal scholars resident in India.

Mayne and others used the Smriti to extract elements of Anglo-Hindu law. Sir William Jones translated the Manu Smriti into English, and it was largely the initial basis of Anglo-Hindu law.

As new literature, such as Naradasmriti and Mitakshara were discovered, disagreements between the smritis became difficult to resolve. Later writers assumed that the smritis constituted a single body of law, one part supplementing the other and every part capable of being reconciled with the other. Regional differences in the texts made the situation more complex.

=== Digests ===
Two digests were made under European influence. The Vivadarnava Setu was compiled at the request of Warren Hastings and is commonly known as Halhed's Gentoo Code. The Vivada Bhangarnava was compiled at the request of Sir William Jones by Jagannatha Turkapunchanana and translated by Henry Colebrooke. It is commonly referred to as Jagannatha's or Colebrooke's Digest. The Gentoo Code, in its English translation is "worthless", because Halhed translated it from Persian, not from Sanskrit. This was not the case for Colebrooke's Digest.

== The code and its development ==
Colonial Hindu legal code marks a large span of nearly two-hundred years, beginning in 1772 and ending in 1947. This time period can be split into two main phases. The first phase, starting in 1772 and ending in 1864, is marked with three main proponents that include the translations of the dharmasastras by the British scholar administrators, the use of court pandits to define laws and rules, and the rise of case law. The second phase, starting in 1864 and ending in 1947, is marked by the dismissal of court pandits, rise of the legislative processes, and a codified law system.

=== Translation of sources ===
The British were under the conviction that all Indian traditions were based on texts and ignored the tradition's customary significance. Furthermore, they thought that different commentaries and interpretations could be systematically sorted out by school and region. This led to the "objectification" of India, where the translation of the law code of India rendered it to more colonisation. The British cherry-picked the conflicting codes in ancient texts to assist colonial aims, through translation.

Warren Hasting's plan of 1772 motivated the British in India to learn Sanskrit as it was necessary for them to govern Bengal. In Hasting's plan Indians were to be governed by Indian principles, particularly in relation to the law. This collection of legal code, picked out from ancient texts of India, came to be known as Anglo-Hindu law. Hastings was aware that British law was too technical, complicated and inappropriate for the conditions in India. In 1774, Hastings wrote to the Lord Chief Justice denying the idea that India was ruled by nothing more than "arbitrary wills, or uninstructed judgments, or their temporary rulers". Hastings was confident that the Hindus and other original inhabitants of India knew written laws, and these were to be found in ancient Sanskrit texts. Initially, no European in Calcutta knew Sanskrit so Hindu pandits' were hired for the job. The original Sanskrit text was translated into a local language, which was then ultimately re-translated into English. Chains of translations were quite common and negatively impacted the value of the original text. The translation, completed by N. B. Halhed, was published in 1776 as A Code of Gentoo Laws; or Ordinations of the Pundits. The code was used in the East India Company's courts until the early 19th century.

=== Warren Hastings' Plan of 1772 ===
Warren Hastings was appointed under a new act of Parliament, the East India Company Act 1772 (13 Geo. 3. c. 63), to the newly created position of governor-general and was instructed by the Court of Directors to stabilise the governance of the Bengal territories. Hastings' plan for the better administration of Bengal was centred on British officers being designated a "collector". The collector would be assigned to a defined area (district) with provincial boundaries and would have mixed executive and judicial power in these areas. Hastings is a very significant figure in the realm of British Imperialism; he was the man who knew the natives and who was to represent the forces of law and order.

He maintained that the natives had an effective administration structure consonant with Indian theory and practice. Though it was clearly not based on European principles, he premised his plan on this notion. Unfortunately, during the fifty years leading up to Hastings' plan, the Bengali system had nearly collapsed. Fortunately, Hastings was more than qualified to essentially start anew. He had a European education and for the first fifteen years of his career, he was stationed near the court of the last effective provincial governors of Bengal. Hastings knew how an Indian state functioned and believed that it was the textual tradition that was relevant to developing British administrative institutions.

Hastings' plan called for two courts. One court dealt with revenue and civil litigation and was called the court of Dewani. The other court dealt with internal order and criminal law and was called the Faujdari court. The "collector", as mentioned above, acted as a judge as he established the facts in the case based on testimony, most commonly depositions from the witnesses, and the documentary evidence was put before the court. His assistant (dewan) and a pandit then found the law that was applicable to the case. Legal specialists, or law professors, interpreted the codes in the legal texts and provided authoritative decisions on the applicable codes. This was the basis for Anglo-Hindu case law. Hastings' was responsible for rejecting the despotic model of Indian law as he stressed the importance of utilising "Indian law" throughout his career.

=== Colebrooke's Two Schools of Law ===
Colebrooke was appointed to the East India Company in 1782. He was skilled at Sanskrit and developed his own conception of the nature and function of Hindu law. Colebrooke led the English in fixing an interpretation of variation in legal texts and this eventually became standard in the British courts in India. He suggested that regional variations or differences existed in India, leading to various interpretations of the same text.

The term "school of law" as it applies to legal opinions of India was first used by Colebrooke. Colebrooke established only two schools that were marked by a vital difference of opinion: those who follow the Mitakshara and those who follow the Daya Bhaga. The Daya Bhaga and the Mitakshara differ in the most vital points because each applied different principles. First, the Daya Bhaga treated religious efficacy as the ruling canon in determining the order of succession, rejecting the preference of agnates to cognates. Secondly, the Daya Bhaga denies the doctrine that property is by birth, the cornerstone of the joint family system. Thirdly, the brothers of the joint family system in the Daya Bhaga recognize their right to dispose of their shares at their pleasure. Fourthly, the Daya Bhaga recognises the right of a widow to succeed her husband's share.

Colebrooke's assumed that the commentaries on Hindu legal texts were the works of "lawyers, juriscouncils and lawgivers", and that these texts were actual law of India before the arrival of Islam, an assumption later scholars found as flawed. Moreover, the British made a false analogy between Hindu law and Muslim law. The British were familiar with the latter, from other British colonies in Africa and the Middle East, as well as having initially worked as agents of the rulers of Mughal Empire. As a result, Colebrooke sought from Hindu texts and yielded a Hindu law to match what were thought of as the schools of Muslim law.

In Colebrooke's view each school had fixed "doctrines" and English judges therefore needed access to the reasons and arguments by which each school supported their doctrine. When Indian scholars could not provide the texts that demonstrated this, European methods were used. After Jones announced that he intended to provide Hindus with their own laws through the mediation of English judges assisted by court appointed pandits, a legal code was in practice. The British sought consistency over time and this created a case law based on precedent.

=== Jones' Digest ===
Sir William Jones was appointed judge in the Supreme Court of Calcutta in 1783. He had studied Persian and Arabic at Oxford and had published a number of translations. Additionally, Jones had an active political career and was a very influential figure of the time. After beginning his judicial career in India he found Halhed's code to be more curious than it was useful. Though he had no intention of ever learning Sanskrit, reacting to the defectiveness of the available translations, he became motivated to do so. By 1786, Jones' Sanskrit was good enough to decide between conflicting opinions of his pandits by reading the appropriate translation of the appropriate text. He was able to discern whose interpretation of the law was correct.

Jones believed there was a fixed body of laws and codes that had been objects of corruption over time. He wanted to provide the British courts in India, the Crown and the East India Company with a basis on which decisions could be rendered consonant with a pure version of Hindu law. Thus, believed Jones, the Anglo-Hindu law could become consistent and fair.

By 1787, Jones had created a plan for the administration of justice in India that reflected the Indian's own principles of jurisprudence. He envisioned a digest (translation completed by Colebrooke) complete with Hindu and Muslim law on the subjects of contracts and inheritances. Jones plan was to find and fix a Hindu civil law with the topics that affected the ownership and transmission of property.

In 1788, Jones requested government support from his plan by reiterating to Cornwallis that it would establish a standard of justice with principles and rules accessible to the English. Cornwallis agreed, and from 1788 until his death in 1794 Jones devoted his time to what would become "The Digest of Hindu Law on Contracts and Successions". By the time of his death he had compiled the Digest in Sanskrit and Arabic and had begun translating them to English. Colebrooke completed the translation in 1797.

=== Other Anglo-Hindu law manuals ===
The digests and manuals that followed Halhed's contained more substance and covered more topics of Hindu law, simply because scholars acquired more texts and regional language skills over time. Sir Thomas Strange was the first Chief Justice of the Supreme Court of Madras from 1801 to 1817. He, in 1825, published a manual of Hindu law. Other sources on Hindu Law include:

1. Mayne, John Dawson. 1906. A Treatise on Hindu Law and Usage
2. Aiyar, Nandivada R. Narasimha. 1893 The Principles of Hindu Law
3. Stokes, Whitley. 1887. The Anglo-Indian Codes
4. Grady, Standish Grove. 1871. A Manual of Hindu Law
5. Strange, Thomas Andrew. 1830. Hindu Law (This is a unique text in so far as it addresses the opinions of the pandits in a question and answer format.)
6. Coghlan, William Mant. 1876. An Epitome of Some Hindu Law Cases
7. Rattigan, William Henry. 1871. Select Cases in Hindu Law Decided by Her Majesty's Privy Council and the Superior Courts in India

=== Case law ===
Hindu law was codified by the British in multiple ways: translation, case law, and enactment of various laws based on debate rather than texts. Legislation came to be the strongest source of law in India in so far as it held the highest jurisdiction when sources conflicted. Examples include,

- The Hindu Widow's Remarriage Act of 1856: Allowed widows to remarry in certain situations.
- The Native Convert's Marriage Dissolution Act of 1866: Allowed for Hindus who had converted to Christianity to dissolve their marriage.
- The Child Marriage Restraint Act of 1929: Restricted marriages of children below a certain age.
- The Hindu Married Women's Right to Separate Residence and Maintenance Act of 1944: Gave special rights to Hindu married women.

=== Timeline of Court System ===
- 1726 - Charter by King George I
  - This is where the British judicial system in India began.
  - Made important changes to judicial administration in the three main Presidency towns of Bombay, Calcutta, and Madras.
- 1772 - Plan for the Administration of Justice
  - Devised by General-Governor Warren Hastings
    - Hindu law is formally established as part of the British legal system administered in colonial India.
    - "In all suits regarding inheritance, marriage, caste and other religious usages or institutions, the laws of the Koran with respect to the Mohamedans and those of Shaster with respect to the Gentoos shall invariably be adhered to" (Sec. 27 of the Administration of Justice Regulation of 11 April 1980).
- 1773 - The East India Company Regulating Act
  - Made provision to establish Supreme Court of Judicature at Fort William at Calcutta, which would supersede the then prevalent judicial system.
- 1774 March 26: the Supreme Court of Judicature at Fort William was established.
  - Supreme Court: had full power and authority to hear and determine all complaints against any of His Majesty's subjects for any crimes and also to entertain, hear and determine any suits or actions against any of His Majesty's subjects in Bengal, Biar, and Orissa.
- 1780 - The Regulating Act
  - Important date because it ended the practice of applying English law to Hindus and Muslims. It required all judges to administer the Islamic and Hindu law. Before this, it was certain whether the judges would apply English or religious law in a particular case.
- 1800 - Established Supreme Court of Madras under Charter issued by King George III
- 1803 - Established Supreme Court of Bombay under Charter issued by King George III
  - Replaced the Recorder's Court
- 1833 - The India Charter Act
  - Called for the creation of the Indian Law Commission, that would be composed of Hindu legal experts, appointed to identify various rules under Hinduism that could be applied to the laws and court system of British India. They were asked to make recommendations for how to consolidate or amend these laws in ways that would prevent gaps in the law.
- 1859 - The Code of Civil Procedure and the Law of Limitation
- 1860 - The Penal Code
- 1861 - The Code of Criminal Procedure
- 1861 - The Indian High Court's Act
  - "Reorganised the then prevalent judicial system in the country by abolishing the Supreme Courts at Fort William, Madras, and Bombay, and also the then existing Sadar Adalats in the Presidency Towns. The High Courts were established having civil, criminal, admiralty, vice-admiralty, testimony, intestate, and matrimonial jurisdiction, as well as original and appellate jurisdiction."
- 1909 - Government of India Act
  - Allowed for Indian participation, albeit limited, in both provincially and central legislative councils. Important step because it allowed Indians, to have a bigger influence the laws that would be administered to Hindus.
- 1935 - Government of India Act
  - Provisions were included for the establishment of a Federal Court, which was necessary in order to make judicial administrations in various provinces more competent between the governmental bodies themselves. This was an important step in unifying India. The Federal Court was a precursor to the Supreme Court of India, which was inaugurated in 1950.

=== The High Courts of British India ===
The three High Courts of Bombay, Calcutta, and Madras were established in the three Presidency towns by Letters Patent from Queen Victoria. Before the Indian High Courts Act of 1961, all three Presidencies had Supreme Courts that were in charge of administering justice. Several other High Courts were established during British rule such as the Allahabad High Court and Karnataka High Court, established in 1866 and 1884, respectively.

=== Judicial Committee of the Privy Council ===
The Judicial Committee of the Privy Council served as the highest court of appeals for Anglo-Hindu law and British Indian law. The Privy Council, located in London, did not only handle Indian appeal cases, its jurisdiction spanned throughout many parts of the British Empire. With regards to India, the Privy Council was successful at infusing English concepts and principles into the British Indian legal system and they thus became an integral part of Indian law.

The right of appeal to the Judicial Committee of the Privy Council was retained after Indian independence, but terminated when the Abolition of Privy Council Jurisdiction Act 1949 came into force on 26 January 1950, when the Republic of India was declared. The Federal Court of India was replaced by the Supreme Court of India.

== See also ==
- Anglo-Muhammadan law
- Gentoo
- Hindu Code Bill
- Hindu Inheritance (Removal of Disabilities) Act, 1928
- Hindu personal law
- History of Anglo-Hindu law
- Modern Hindu law
- Wareru Dhammathat
