= Muslim personal law =

Set of laws that govern Muslims in India

All the Muslims in India are governed by the Muslim Personal Law (Shariat) Application Act, 1937. This law deals with marriage, succession, inheritance and charities among Muslims. The Dissolution of Muslim Marriages Act, 1939 deals with the circumstances in which Muslim women can obtain divorce and rights of Muslim women who have been divorced by their husbands and to provide for related matters. These laws are not applicable in the states of Goa, where Goa civil code is applicable for all persons irrespective of religion and the state of Uttarakhand. These laws are not applicable to Indians, including Muslims, who married under the Special Marriage Act, 1954.

== History ==
Evidence of Muslim personal code can be found since 1206 on the Indian peninsula with the establishment of Islamic rule in parts of the region. During the reign of Mamluk dynasty (1206–1290 A.D), Khalji dynasty (1290–1321), the Tughlaq dynasty (1321–1413), the Lodi dynasty (1451–1526) and the Sur dynasty (1539–1555), the court of Shariat, assisted by the Mufti, dealt with cases involving personal law among Muslims. During Sher Shah's regime, the powers of the court were restricted and Muslim law was modified to suit the requirements of the time. During the regime of Mughal kings Babar and Humayun, the earlier laws were followed, and the ulemas (religious scholars) had considerable influence on legal decisions. During Akbar's regime, Ulemas' powers were reduced and shattered the dominance of the orthodox Sunni school. During Jehangir's regime, cutting of noses and ears and death penalty could not be inflicted without the Emperor's permission. Aurangzeb ordered the compilation of a code of law.

=== East India Company ===
Under the East India company, Muslim Law was enforced except when Muslims left the disputes to be determined according to Hindu Saastras. The Regulation 11 of 1772 by Sec. 27 enacted that

"in all suits regarding inheritance, succession, marriage and caste and other religious usages or institutions, the laws of the Quran with respect of Mohamedan and those of the Shastras with respect to Gentoos (Hindus) shall be invariably adhered to."

In 1822, the Privy Council recognized the right of Shia Muslims to their own law.

=== British Raj ===
The British Raj passed the Shariat Application Act in 1937, which is followed in India in matters related to marriage, divorce and succession among Muslims.

=== Independent India ===
India's achievement of independence from the British was meant to show about significant change in the regular life of Indians. Previously under British rule, Indian society was defined by social collectives, caste and religious identity, with a lack of focus on citizenship and the individual. An Indian's relationship with politics and the law was indeed determined by these social measures; the Fundamental Rights Constitution was passed and intended to reverse this concept that an individual could be limited based upon caste, religion, economic status, etc. However, the new standards laid out in the Constitution have not come to fruition in society, even 6 years after the passing of the act. Aspects of gender, caste and religion are still determinants of political influence and access to resources.

The Shariat Application Act was enacted by the British government in India in 1937, and, after India became independent from Britain, the Shariat Act (MPL) was maintained in Indian society. The law was originally introduced as a matter of policy by the British government, but upon independence MPL became significant to Muslim identity and religion. This primary aspect of religion has created controversy across both Muslim communities and Hindu political organizations. The Indian Parliament passed Hindu Code Bills, consisting of Hindu Marriage Act (1955), Hindu Succession Act (1956), Hindu Minority and Guardianship Act (1956) and Hindu Adoptions and Maintenance Act (1956). Those who practised Sikhism, Jainism, and Buddhism were considered to be Hindus under the jurisdiction of the Code Bill.

=== Current Debates ===
Recent debates related to Muslim Personal Law (MPL) are particularly in favor of abolishing the existing legal system for several reasons. It is said that the current organization of MPL in place discriminates against women in three distinct ways; they are that 1) a Muslim man is allowed to marry up to four wives at a time, 2) he can divorce his wife without entering into any legal processes, and 3) he does not need to provide financial support to his ex-wife after three months of the divorce, whereas men of other religions are likely required to support their ex-wives forever.

The Shah Bano case of 1978 is related to these discriminatory provisions. A woman named Shah Bano was married to a man named Mohommed Ahmed Khan. Khan fathered several children with a second wife and Shah bano was forced out of the home; she initially sought a maintenance order for Rs. 500 per month, but was given only Rs. 200 per month upon the separation agreement. No contribution was ever made to her, and she decided to seek legal counsel as a result. Khan very clearly dictated the purpose of the divorce by deciding exactly how much to award Shah Bano with, when to award her and how to do it. By finally deciding to enter into the legal system, Bano shows her pursuit of other interests and the conflict related to Muslim domestic life.

== Marriage and divorce ==
In India, Muslim marriage is a civil contract between a man and a woman. Dissolution of marriage can be done at the instance of the husband (talaq), wife (khula) or mutually (mubarat). Talaq allows a Muslim man to legally divorce his wife by stating the word talaq. Some Muslim groups recognize triple talaq (or talaq-i-biddat), stating three talaqs at once and proclaiming instant divorce as valid method. On 22 August 2017, the Supreme Court of India deemed instant triple talaq unconstitutional. The Muslim Women (Protection of Rights on Marriage) Act, 2019, which declared instant talaq illegal, void, and cognizable offence, came into effect retroactively from 19 September 2018 after being given assent by the president of India on 31 July 2019 and women can file case against it in court.

Other Muslim groups follow talaq-i-hasan, where the husband pronounces talaqs on three separate instances, each one at least 1 lunar month apart. If the husband changes his mind after the first or second talaq, or cohabits with his wife, the divorce is nullified.

The husband can delegate power to pronounce talaq to his wife or a third person by agreement, called talaq-e-tafweez.

Section 5 of the Shariat Act of 1937 concerns Muslim women seeking divorce. Section 5 was subsequently deleted and replaced by Dissolution of Muslim Marriages Act 1939. Muslim women can seek divorce in a court of law. A woman can ask for divorce in the following circumstances:

- if whereabouts of the husband has not been known for four years
- if the husband has not provided for her maintenance for two years
- if the husband has been sentenced to imprisonment for seven years or more
- if the husband has failed to perform his marital obligations for three years
- if the husband was impotent at the time of marriage and remains impotent
- if the husband has been insane for two years or is suffering from leprosy or virulent venereal disease
- if the husband treats the wife with cruelty, even if absent physical violence
- if the wife has been given in marriage by her father or guardian before she reached age 15
- if the husband associates with women of evil repute or leads an infamous life or attempts to force her to lead an immoral life
- if the husband disposes of her property or prevents her exercising her legal rights over it
- if the husband obstructs her in the observance of her religious profession or practice
- if he has more than one wife, or does not treat her equitably in accordance with the Quran; or carries out any other ground recognised as valid for the dissolution of marriages under Muslim law.

== Inheritance ==
=== Rules of inheritance ===
- A son gets double the share of the daughter wherever they jointly inherit.
- The wife gets one-eighth of the share if there are children and one-fourth of the share if there are no children. In case the husband has more than one wife, the one-eighth share is divided equally among them. The husband gets one fourth of the share of his dead wife's property, if there are children and one-half if there are no children.
- If the parent has more than one daughter, only two-thirds of the property is divided equally among daughters. If the parent has only one daughter, half of the parent's property is inherited by her.
- The mother gets one-sixth of her dead child's property if there are grandchildren, and one-third of the property if there are no grandchildren.
- Parents, children, husband and wife all cases, get shares, whatever may be the number or degree of the other heirs.

=== Mahr ===
Mahr is the total money or property that the husband is required to give the wife at the time of marriage (Nikah). The two types of mahr are the prompt mahr which is given to the wife soon after the marriage, and the deferred mahr, which is given to the wife when the marriage has ended, either due to the death of the husband or by divorce.

=== Will ===
A Muslim can only give one third of his/her total property through a will (wasiyat).

=== Gift ===
Any type of property can be given as gift.

== See also ==
- Christian personal law
- Hindu personal law
- Special Marriage Act, 1954
- Muslim Women (Protection of Rights on Marriage) Act, 2019
- Dissolution of Muslim Marriages Act, 1939
- Uniform civil code
