= History of Anglo-Hindu law =

Hindu laws in Colonial period

Anglo-Hindu law reflected the difference in values between "law" in Western tradition and colonial Hindu tradition. It was not until the 1770s, when the British Empire came to colonize India, that the concept of law came into practice.

Colonial Hindu law marks a long span of nearly 200 years, beginning in 1772 and ending in 1947. This period may be split into two main phases. The first phase (beginning in 1772 and ending in 1864) is marked by three main events: translation of the Dharmaśāstras by British scholar-administrators, the use of court pandits to define laws and rules, and the rise of case law. The second phase (from 1864 to 1947) is marked by the dismissal of court pandits, the rise of legislative processes, and a codified law system.

== Pre-British India ==
The British had been observing the country for nearly twenty years before their first implemented legal plan for renovating India's method of governing. As Europeans began gaining power and increasing the number of territories they controlled, they gradually became acquainted with the way the different territorial systems operated. Beginning with the coastal territories and moving inland, the British accumulated more Indian states. However, they could not oppose the customs and traditions that were already in place without offending the native peoples because they only held a minimal amount of power to implement change and enact laws, they had to respect the wishes the natives or reach a compromise. The British had to administer law coinciding with the rule of each zamindar (hereditary leader); this meant that only customary law could be implemented at that time.

=== Religious remedies ===
There was tension between the two religious groups (Muslim and Hindu), since the sources of their rules differed greatly. The Muslims' governing body (and laws) derived from the Qur'an and books written by doctors who had studied Sharia. For the Hindu population, however, the guidelines on how to live life came from the Dharmaśāstras (Sanskrit texts describing duties). Although laws in place were text-based, there was still a great deal of variation between different regions. Customary law was the main type of government in the territories and differed greatly in defining crime, punishment, guilt, how courts were organized and so on.

The British saw this system as unfair, due to the ambiguity of laws in different regions and lack of a common law. They believed this system to be dysfunctional and an invitation for corruption, due to the ability of judges to decide a case as they saw fit with no precedent. For example, two cases could have virtually-identical facts but the outcome and punishment of the two might be very different. This was not a problem in the Indian tradition, but the British proposed a plan for unifying laws.

== First British law ==
India underwent a seismic shift in the way in which she was governed on August 21, 1772, when, in Bengal's capital city Calcutta, a new plan of governance was implemented by Warren Hastings. This marked the first step towards uniting Muslim and Hindu legal traditions. The “Plan for the Administration and Justice in Bengal” (more commonly known as the "Judicial Plan") laid the foundation for replacing ambiguous laws that were not formally written down into a British system, with different branches of government. Warren Hastings’ Judicial Plan included a provision which left certain religious matters to traditional law. This stipulated that inheritance, marriage, caste, and other religious use or institutions should be in accordance with the Dharmaśāstras and not subject to British law.

== See also ==
- Hindu Code Bill
- Hindu Inheritance (Removal of Disabilities) Act, 1928
- Hindu personal law
- Modern Hindu law
- History of Hinduism
- Hindu Marriage Act, 1955
