= Modern Hindu law =

Personal law system in India

Modern Hindu law is one of the personal law systems of India along with similar systems for Muslims, Sikhs, Parsis, and Christians. This Hindu Personal Law or modern Hindu law is an extension of the Anglo-Hindu Law developed during the British colonial period in India, which is in turn related to the less well-defined tradition of Classical Hindu Law. The time frame of this period of Hindu law begins with the formal independence of India from United Kingdom on August 15, 1947, and extends up until the present. While modern Hindu law is heralded for its inherent respect for religious doctrines, many still complain that discrimination (especially with the historical tradition of the caste system) still pervades the legal system, though efforts to modernize and increase the legal rights of the marginalized have been made (most notably with the passage of the Hindu Code Bills and the establishment of notable legal precedents).

== History and context ==
With the formal independence of India from United Kingdom on August 15, 1947, India acquired a new constitution as well as a complex legal system. While a Western influence is apparent in this system, it is not an exact replication. The Indian legal system has characteristics of common law, but is codified and thus is actually more similar to civil law in nature. The modern Hindu legal system is applied to strictly personal law, including issues of marriage, inheritance and adoption, whereas India's secular legal system is applied to issues of criminal law and civil law.

India's first prime minister, Jawaharlal Nehru, and the then law minister, Dr. Babasaheb Ambedkar, worked to unify the newly independent India by proposing the reformation and codification of Hindu personal law. Nehru's efforts led to contentious debates over the so-called Hindu Code Bill, which he offered in the Indian parliament, as a way to fix still unclear elements of the Anglo-Hindu law. The Hindu Code Bill was initially and continues to be very controversial within and outside of the Hindu community. Criticism of the document is based on the belief that the laws in the Hindu Code bill should apply to all citizens regardless of religious affiliation. Though a small minority suggested some kind of return to classical Hindu law, the real debate was over how to appropriate the Anglo-Hindu law.

Nehru completed codification and partial reform, but overall the legal system only slightly changed. In the end, a series of four major pieces of personal law legislation were passed in 1955-56 and these laws form the first point of reference for modern Hindu law: Hindu Marriage Act (1955), Hindu Succession Act (1956), Hindu Minority and Guardianship Act (1956), and Hindu Adoptions and Maintenance Act (1956). Though these legislative moves purported to resolve still unclear parts of the Anglo-Hindu law, the case law and interpretive tradition of British judges and Indian judges in the British employ remained and remains crucial to the application of modern Hindu law.

== Application of modern Hindu law ==
As stated by Article 44 of the Indian Constitution, India is a secular state that strives towards legal uniformity. Many argue that the commitment of the Indian government towards this gradual uniformity of the legal system threatens the minority religious groups that utilize the plurality of the law to maintain traditions and implement their religious laws.

Before discussing the modern application and sources of Hindu law it is important to outline whom these laws govern. In the case of Hindu personal and family laws, as outlined by the Acts of Parliament discussed below, those that are followers the Hindu religion, as well as those who are not Christian, Jewish or Muslim, are held accountable to these laws. Therefore, it is assumed that all Indians who are not Muslim, Jewish or Christian are Hindu, disregarding personal religious laws of followers of Buddhist, Jain, Sikh and other religions, creating controversy within these communities. The Indian legal system does recognize Muslim, Jewish and Christian family courts as well as secular family courts.

== Sources of modern Hindu law ==
Sources of Classical Hindu law arose from the religious texts of the Dharmaśāstra, as well as āćāra or customs, and commentaries or digests that translated and interpreted the laws. Since British colonial rule, India has codified several aspects of the Hindu tradition into the Indian legal system as well as adopted common and civil legal procedures.

=== Legislation ===
Legislation, as created and implemented by the Indian government, is the strongest source of law in all Indian courts. In the case of two conflicting sources, legislation holds the highest jurisdiction. While it is not a traditional source of law for the Hindu legal system, it is the latest and most legitimate form.

During colonial rule, the British codified several aspects of the Hindu legal tradition into the Indian legal system, based upon the large number of Hindus residing in British India. Thus upon gaining independence, many of the same laws that governed the country during colonial rule were maintained as such, making the Indian Constitution and legal system heavily influenced with Hindu legal traditions at its foundation.

=== Case law ===
India is based on the British common legal system, thus the courts rely heavily on stare decisis, or precedent, when deciding cases. Any case decision made by a higher court is a source of law to all of the lower courts, in the prospect that the laws will be applied in a similar manner. The Hindu family courts are expected to follow laws handed down from previous cases.

Modern Hindu law relies on the interpretation of judges and their ability to decipher mitigating factors within each legal situation. This is reflective of the ancient Hindu legal tradition of working out problems on a case specific basis in finding justice in each specific instance.

=== Notable legal precedents and legislation ===
As is the case with many global legal systems that rely on precedents as a source of law, certain cases stand out that have shaped the Indian legal system into what it is today. Not only do they provide the foundation for future legal cases but they also make a statement about the state of the country and what direction it wants to lead. One such case came about during the efforts of modernization reforms in India. Known as the Medical Termination of Pregnancy Act (1971), the law allowed Indian women to legally obtain abortions. Thus this law made not only a religious statement, as India was trying to become more secular, but also made a statement of equality as it expanded the rights women had.

Early in December 2008, a marriage between a Hindu and a Christian was deemed invalid under the Hindu Marriage Act (1955) as the Act provides for only Hindu couples to enter into a wedlock, the Supreme Court has ruled. Allegedly, Raj had misinformed his wife about his social status and she filed for divorce. He claimed that the Hindu Marriage Act does not preclude a Hindu from marrying a person of another faith. Dismissing the Christian husband’s appeal, the apex court upheld the High Courts’s view that the marriage not valid under the Hindu Marriage Act, specifically pointing to the fact that Section 5 of the Act makes it clear that a marriage may be solemnized between any two Hindus if the conditions in the said Section were fulfilled.

=== Hindu code bills ===
Following independence, the Indian government led by Jawaharlal Nehru & Law Minister Dr. B. R. Ambedkar completed the codification and reform of Hindu personal law, a process that had been begun by the British. According to the British policy of noninterference, reform of personal law should have arisen from a demand from the Hindu community. This was not the case, as there was significant opposition from various Hindu politicians, organizations, and devotees who saw themselves unjustly singled out as the sole religious community whose laws were to be reformed. However, the administration saw such codification as necessary in order to unify the Hindu community, which ideally would be a first step towards unifying the nation. They succeeded in passing four Hindu Code Bills, including Hindu Marriage Act (1955), Hindu Succession Act (1956), Hindu Minority and Guardianship Act (1956), and Hindu Adoptions and Maintenance Act (1956).

Nehru and his supporters insisted that the Hindu community, which comprised 80% of the Indian population, first needed to be united before any actions were taken to unify the rest of India. Therefore, the codification of Hindu personal law became a symbolic beginning on the road to establishing the Indian national identity. Nehru also felt that because he was Hindu, it was his prerogative to codify specifically Hindu law, as opposed to Muslim or Jewish law.

Those in Parliament who supported the Bills also saw them as a vital move towards the modernization of Hindu society, as they would clearly delineate secular laws from religious law. Many also heralded the Bill’s opportunity to implement greater rights for women, establishing that such rights were necessary for India’s development.

The Hindu Code Bills are still controversial among some communities, including women's, nationalist, and religious groups. At the time of their creation, many portrayed them as a serious deviation from Hindu legal precedent. However, now many, including Nivedita Menon, argue that it is "misleading...to claim that Hindu personal law was reformed [in the 1950s]. It was merely codified, and even that was in the face of stiff resistance from Congress leaders."

== Administration and practice ==
There are no religious courts in India, as it is a secular nation. Rather religious personal laws are adjudicated by the state on a case by case basis.

=== Courts ===
The court system of India is essentially divided into three tiers, the Supreme Court of India at the apex of the hierarchy for the entire country, twenty-one High Courts at the top of the hierarchy in each State, and subsequent district courts that govern family, criminal and civil laws within the states. The High Courts have jurisdiction over a state, a union territory or a group of states and union territories. District courts are the courts of first resort. It is within the district courts that Hindu law and other religious laws are administered. State judges apply Hindu law on a case by case basis.

=== Judges ===
The judges that preside over the district courts in India are state bureaucrats, not religious priests or scholars. Thus it is possible for a Hindu judge to preside over a divorce case between a Muslim couple or for a Christian judge to preside over a case involving a Hindu family. With no formal education on the religious laws of the state, judges may not be well versed in the laws they are to adjudicate. They rely heavily on case precedent and scholarly works to guide them through the cases.

=== Lawyers ===
Lawyers in India are trained in general law schools and receive no formal and specific training on Hindu law, Muslim law, or any other personal religious laws. All lawyers are however required to take courses regarding personal law. These larger courses touch on the variety of personal laws that exist in India, including Hindu Law.
