= Hindu Inheritance (Removal of Disabilities) Act, 1928 =

Act during British India

Imperial Legislative Council
- Enacted by: Imperial Legislative Council
- Status: Repealed

The Hindu Inheritance (Removal of Disabilities) Act, 1928 was enacted to abolish the exclusion from inheritance of certain classes of heirs, and to remove certain doubts and ambiguities regarding their ability to inherit property. The Act specifies that individuals who are diseased, deformed, or physically or mentally handicapped cannot be disqualified from their right to own or share joint family property, unless otherwise specified by law. This Act effectively abolishes the ancient Hindu legal practice of treating handicapped individuals as ineligible to inherit property from their family.

== See also ==
- Hindu Code Bill
- Hindu personal law
- History of Anglo-Hindu law
- Modern Hindu law
