= Christian personal law =

Religious law in India

Christian personal law or family law regulates adoption, divorce, guardianship, marriage and succession in India. The provisions of canon law concerning marriage are recognised as the personal law of Roman Catholics in India (except in the state of Goa). Marriages of Indian Christians are regulated by the Indian Christian Marriage Act, 1872. Christian personal law is not applicable in Goa; instead, the Goa civil code (also known as Goa Family Law) is the set of civil laws that regulate the residents of the Indian state of Goa. In India as a whole, there are religion-specific civil codes that separately govern adherents of different religions. Goa is an exception to that rule in that a single secular code governs all Goans, irrespective of religion, ethnicity or linguistic affiliation.

== Adoption ==
Christians in India can adopt children by resorting to section 41 of the Juvenile Justice (Care and Protection of Children) Act of 2006 and the guidelines and rules issued by various state governments.

== Divorce ==
Both husband and wife can seek a divorce on the grounds of:

1. Adultery
2. Cruelty
3. Desertion for more than seven years
4. Insanity for more than two years
5. Incurable leprosy for more than two years
6. Conversion to another religion
7. Willful refusal to consummate the marriage
8. Not being heard from for 7 years
9. Venereal disease in communicable form for two years
10. Failure to obey the order for restitution of conjugal rights

However, the wife can additionally sue for divorce on the grounds of:

1. Rape
2. Sodomy
3. Bestiality
4. Incest

== Guardianship ==
Christians in India are governed generally by the provisions of the Guardians and Wards Act (Central Act No 8 of 1890). It deals with matters relating to guardianship of minors in respect to their person and property.

== Marriage ==
Christian marriage in India is regulated by the Indian Christian Marriage Act, 1872. The Law applies to the entirety of India except for the territories which, immediately before 1 November 1956, formed the states of Travancore-Cochin, Manipur and Jammu and Kashmir. Therefore, the act does not apply to marriages of Christians solemnised in the territories of the former states of Travancore and Cochin which now form part of Kerala.

The Tamil Nadu Legislature, by its Act No 27 of 1995, extended the Indian Christian Marriage Act, 1872 to the territories of the Kanyakumari District and Sengottai Thaluk (which were transferred to Tamil Nadu after the reorganization of Indian states). However, civil marriages among Christians in the former princely state of Cochin are regulated by the provisions of the Cochin Christian Civil Marriage Act 1095 ME. Civil marriages among Christians in Jammu and Kashmir are regulated by the Jammu and Kashmir Christian Marriage and Divorce Act, 1957. There is no statute regulating solemnisation of marriages among Christians in Manipur; rather, customary law and personal law prevail there.

== Succession ==
The Indian Succession Act, 1865 was comprehensively amended and consolidated by the Indian Succession Act, 1925. Neither the Indian Succession Act, 1865 nor the act of 1925 was to apply to Christians in India.

== See also ==
- Hindu personal law
- Muslim personal law
- Prohibition of Child Marriage Act, 2006
- Hindu Marriage Act, 1955
- Muslim Women (Protection of Rights on Divorce) Act 1986
- Special Marriage Act, 1954
- Uniform civil code
