= Gentoo =

Gentoo may refer to:

- Gentoo penguin, a species of bird.
- Gentoo Linux, a computer operating system distribution named after the penguin.
- Gentoo (file manager), a free file manager for Linux and other Unix-like systems.
- Gentoo (term), an alternative, archaic name of the Telugu language, or a historical, archaic term for Hindus.
- Gentoo Code, a document translated from Sanskrit regarding inheritance laws in Hinduism.
- Gentoo Media, an affiliate marketing company based in Malta.
