= Sepoy =

Designation given to a South Asian soldier

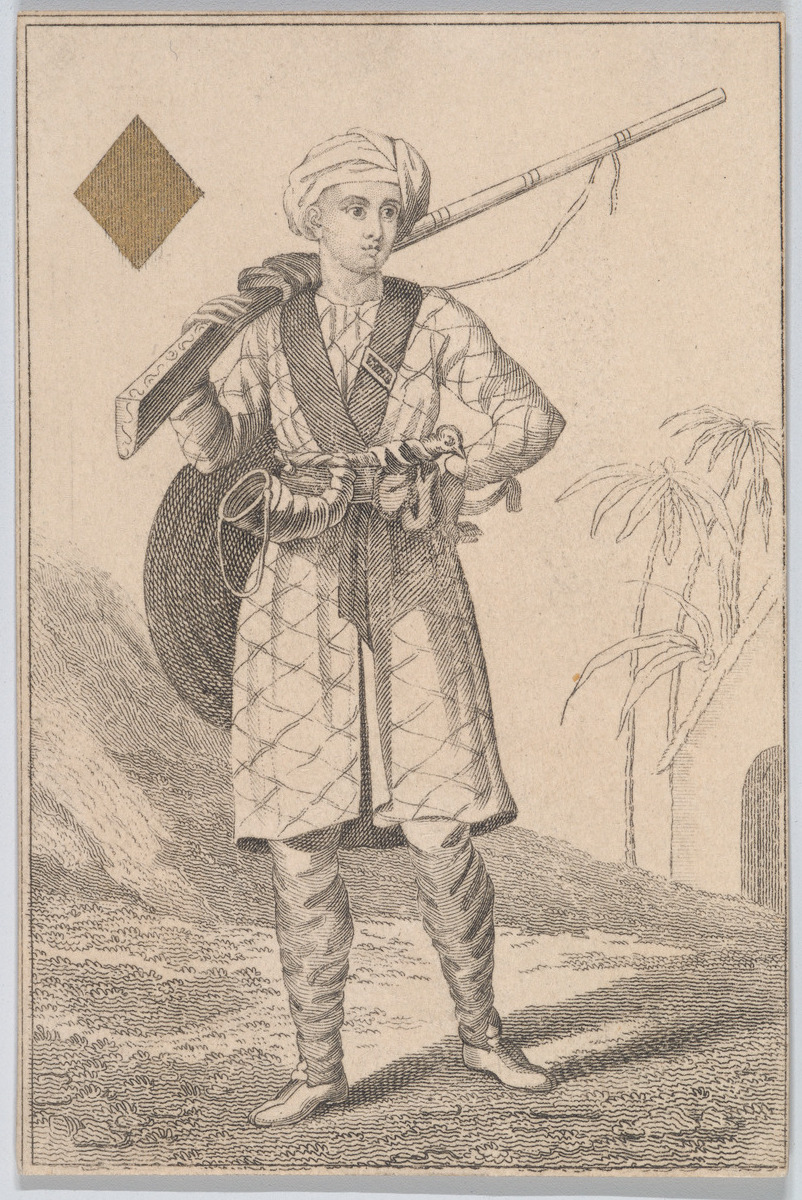
- Illustration of Hyder Ali as a sepoy
- Active: 16th to 21st centuries
- Country: Mughal Empire; Maratha Empire; Sultanate of Mysore; India; Pakistan; Nepal
- Branch: Infantry and artillery
- Equipment: Musket

A sepoy (/ˈsiːpɔɪ/) is a South Asian soldier. Originating from the Persian word sepāhī (سپاهی), the term was anglicised to "sepoy" by the British. In the army of the Mughal Empire sepāhī referred to a type of infantryman, while in colonial India it was used as a term for native troops in European service. During the early modern era European colonial authorities in India, most prominently those of the British East India Company, raised units of sepoys for service against native states or other European powers. The term was used as the equivalent rank of private in the Presidency armies and British Indian Army along with the modern-day Indian, Pakistani and Nepalese armies.

== Etymology ==
In Persian اسپ (Aspa) means horse and Ispahai is also the word for cavalrymen.

The term sepoy is the anglicised form of the Persian word sepāhī (سپاهی), meaning the traditional "infantry soldier" in the Mughal Empire.

=== Historical usage ===
The term sepoy came into common use in the forces of the British East India Company in the eighteenth century, where it was one of a number of names, such as peons, gentoos, mestees and topasses, used for various categories of native soldier. Initially it referred to Hindu or Muslim soldiers without regular uniforms or discipline. It later generically referred to all native soldiers in the service of the European powers in India. Close to ninety-six percent of the British East India Company's army of 300,000 men were native to India and these sepoys played a crucial role in securing the subcontinent for the company.. Sepoys were the most salient example of the use of indigenous troops by European empires. In the eighteenth century, most soldiers serving the European empires in the South Asia and Indian Ocean were Sepoys. Some of them were deployed in colonial wars of Southeast Asia. They can be considered as a salient example in the early globalization of military workforces.

== Equipment ==
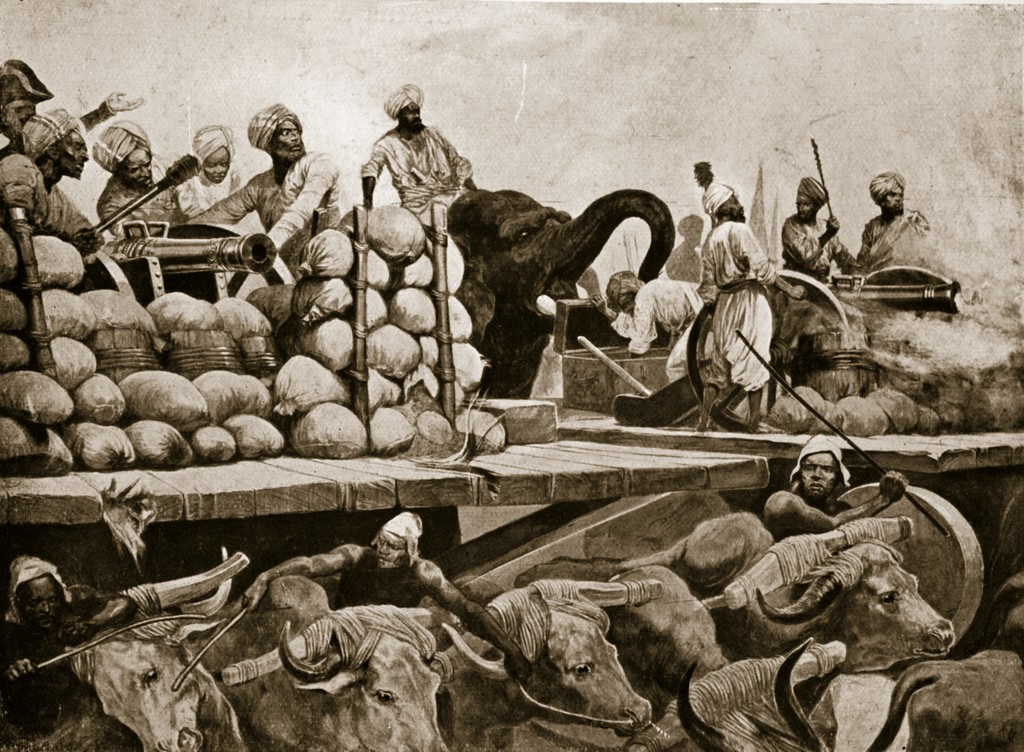
Sepoy units loyal to the Nawab of Bengal armed with artillery pieces and a war elephant.

The earliest sepoys used matchlock muskets and operated bulky and inefficient cannons to a limited extent during the reign of Akbar. By the time of Aurangzeb the Mughal armies had advanced significantly and utilized a wider range of weapons to win battles.

During the Carnatic Wars and Anglo-Mysore Wars the sepoys of the Mughal Empire employed more advanced types of musket, as well as blunderbuss and rocket weapons.

== History ==
=== Mughal Empire 16th–18th centuries ===
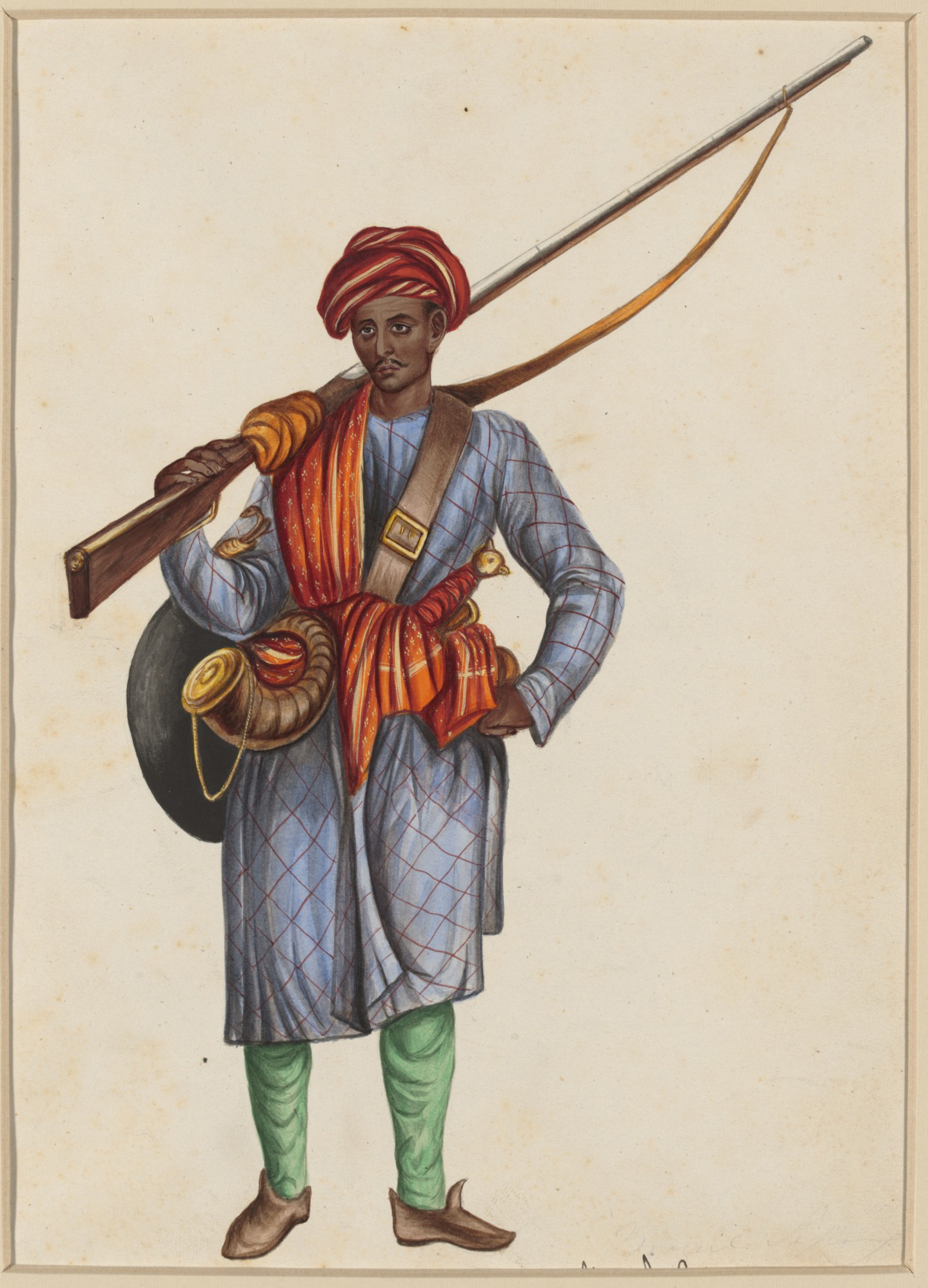
A Mughal sepoy, under the command of Mirza Najaf Khan.

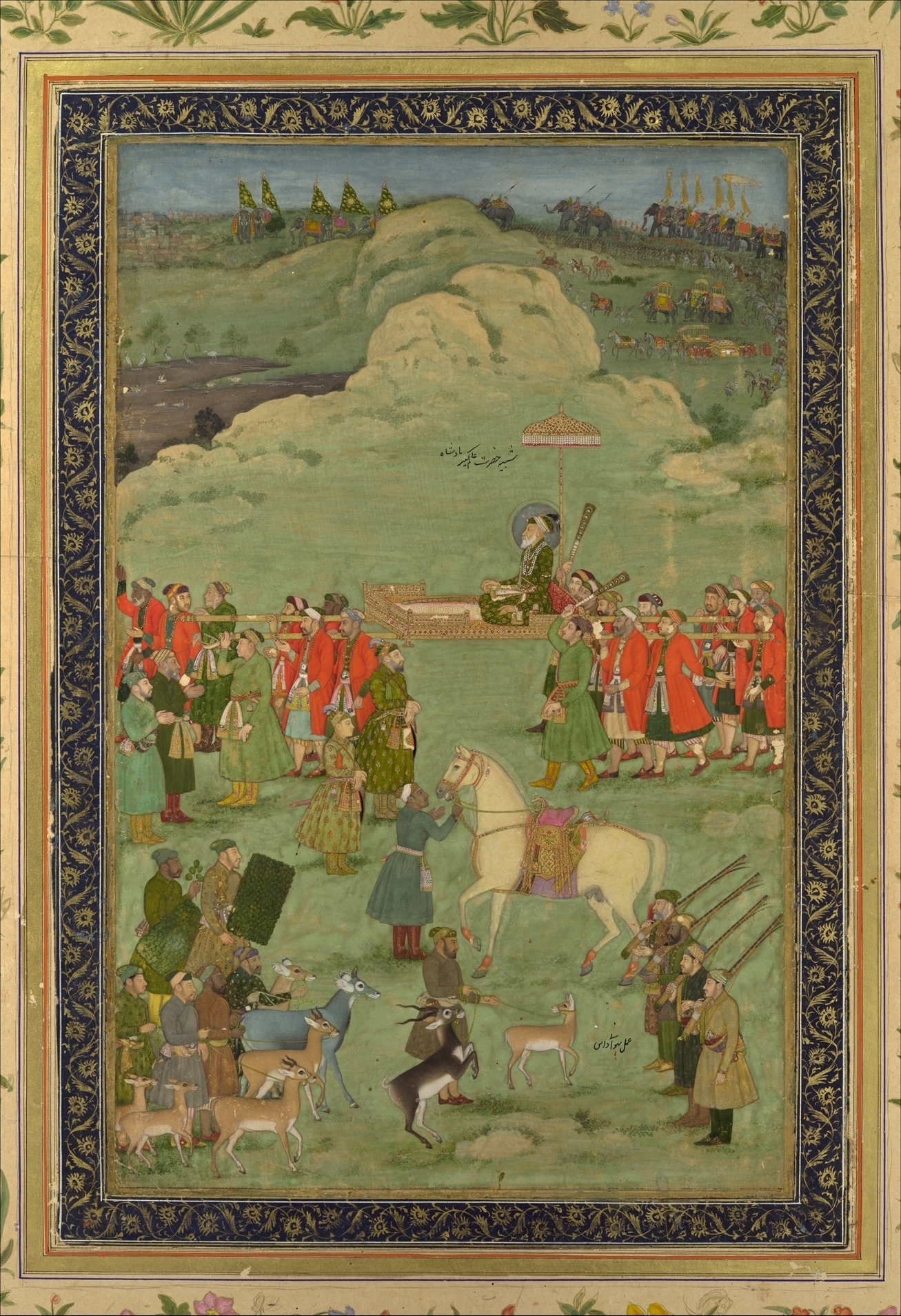
The Mughal Emperor Aurangzeb leads his final expedition (1705), (sepoy column visible in the lower right).

A Sipahi or a sepoy was an infantryman armed with a musket in the army of the Mughal Empire.

The earliest sepoys were armed with daggers, talwars and matchlocks. By the mid to late 17th century they began to utilize more upgraded forms of muskets and even rockets. These sepoys also operated and mounted artillery pieces and sharpshooter upon war elephants which were also used for transport, hauling artillery and in combat.

By the 18th century individual Nawabs employed their own sepoy units as did the European merchant companies established in parts of India.

Sepoys became more visible when they gained European arms and fought for various fragmented polities of the Mughal Empire during the Carnatic Wars and the Bengal War, after which the importance of the local sepoy diminished and they were replaced by the "European hired Sepoy".

=== Sepoys in British service ===
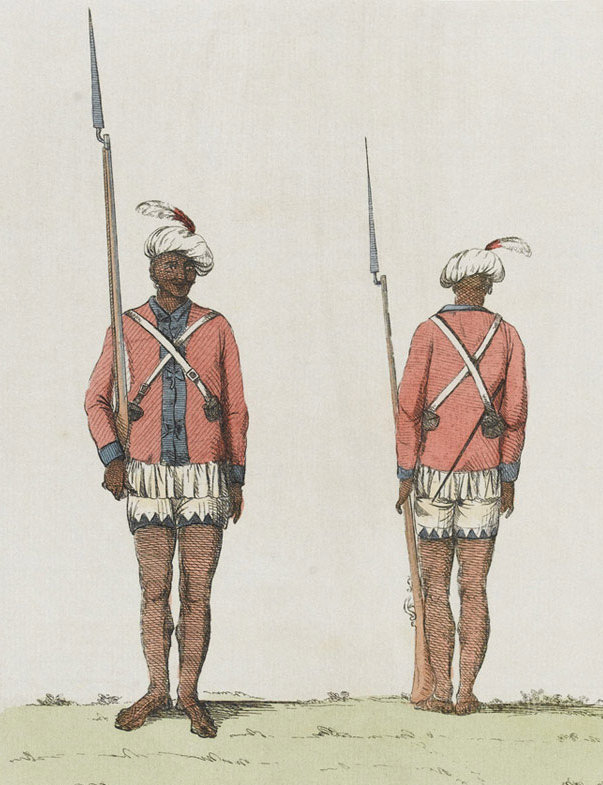
1773 illustration of two Bombay Army sepoys

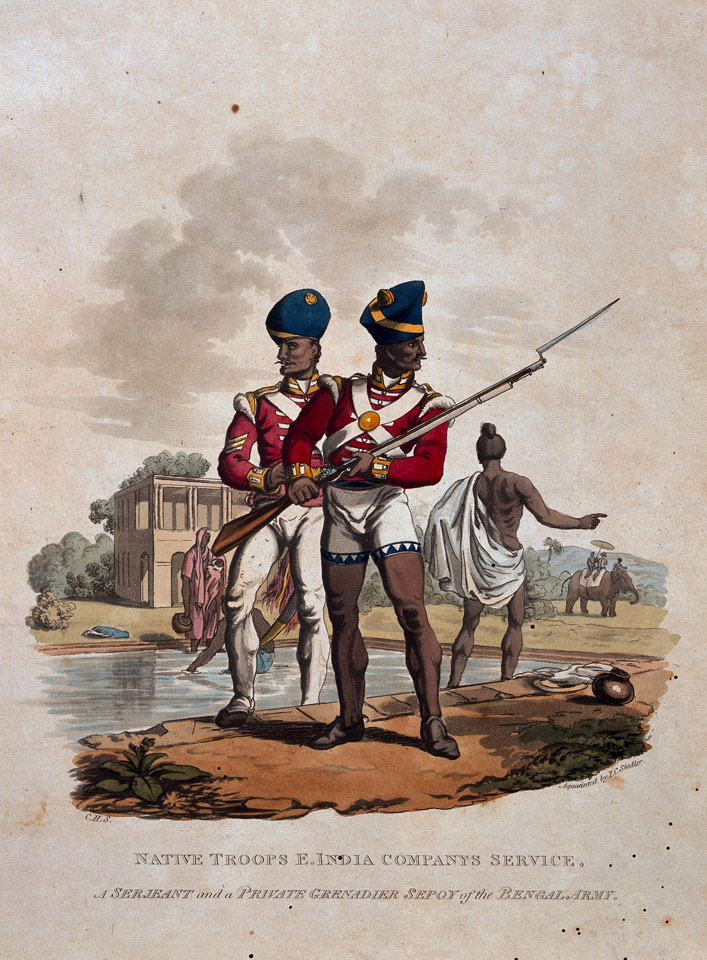
1812 engraving of two Bengal Army sepoys

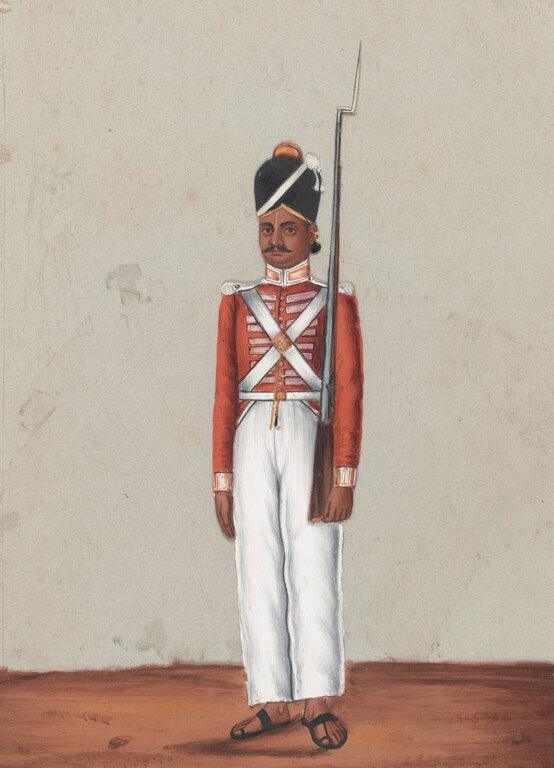
c. 1835 illustration of a Madras Army sepoy

The East India Company initially recruited sepoys from the local communities in the Madras and Bombay Presidencies. The emphasis here favoured tall and soldierly recruits, broadly defined as being "of a proper caste and of sufficient size". In the Bengal Army however, recruitment was only amongst high caste Brahmin and Rajput communities, mainly from the present day Uttar Pradesh and Bihar regions. Recruitment was undertaken locally by battalions or regiments often from the same community, village and even family. The commanding officer of a battalion became a form of substitute for the village chief or gaon bura. He was the mai-baap or the "father and mother" of the sepoys making up the paltan (from "platoon"). There were many family and community ties amongst the troops and numerous instances where family members enlisted in the same battalion or regiment. The izzat ("honour") of the unit was represented by the regimental colours; the new sepoy having to swear an oath in front of them on enlistment. These colours were stored in honour in the quarter guard and frequently paraded before the men. They formed a rallying point in battle. The oath of fealty by the sepoy was given to the East India Company and included a pledge of faithfulness to the salt that one has eaten.

"so long as the Sepoys maintain their formations, which they call 'lines', they are like an immovable volcano spewing artillery and rifle fire like unrelenting hail on the enemy, and they are seldom defeated."

— Dean Mahomed, a Bengal Army sepoy

The salary of the sepoys employed by the East India Company, while not substantially greater than that paid by the rulers of Indian states, was usually paid regularly. Advances could be given and family allotments from pay due were permitted when the troops served abroad. There was a commissariat and regular rations were provided. Weapons, clothing and ammunition were provided centrally, in contrast to the soldiers of local kings whose pay was often in arrears. In addition local rulers usually expected their sepoys to arm themselves and to sustain themselves through plunder. This combination of factors led to the development of a sense of shared honour and ethos amongst the well drilled and disciplined Indian soldiery who formed the key to the success of European feats of arms in India and abroad.

In 1858 following the Indian Rebellion of 1857 the surviving East India Company regiments continued as the armies of the three presidencies until they were merged into a new Indian Army under the direct control of the British Crown in 1895. (The Company had come under the control of the Crown but in 1874 it was abolished.) The designation of "sepoy" was retained for Indian soldiers below the rank of lance naik, except in cavalry where the equivalent ranks were sowar or "trooper".

Presidency	Monthly Salary In Rupees (1760s)
Bengal	6
Bombay	7
Madras	7

=== Sepoys in French service ===
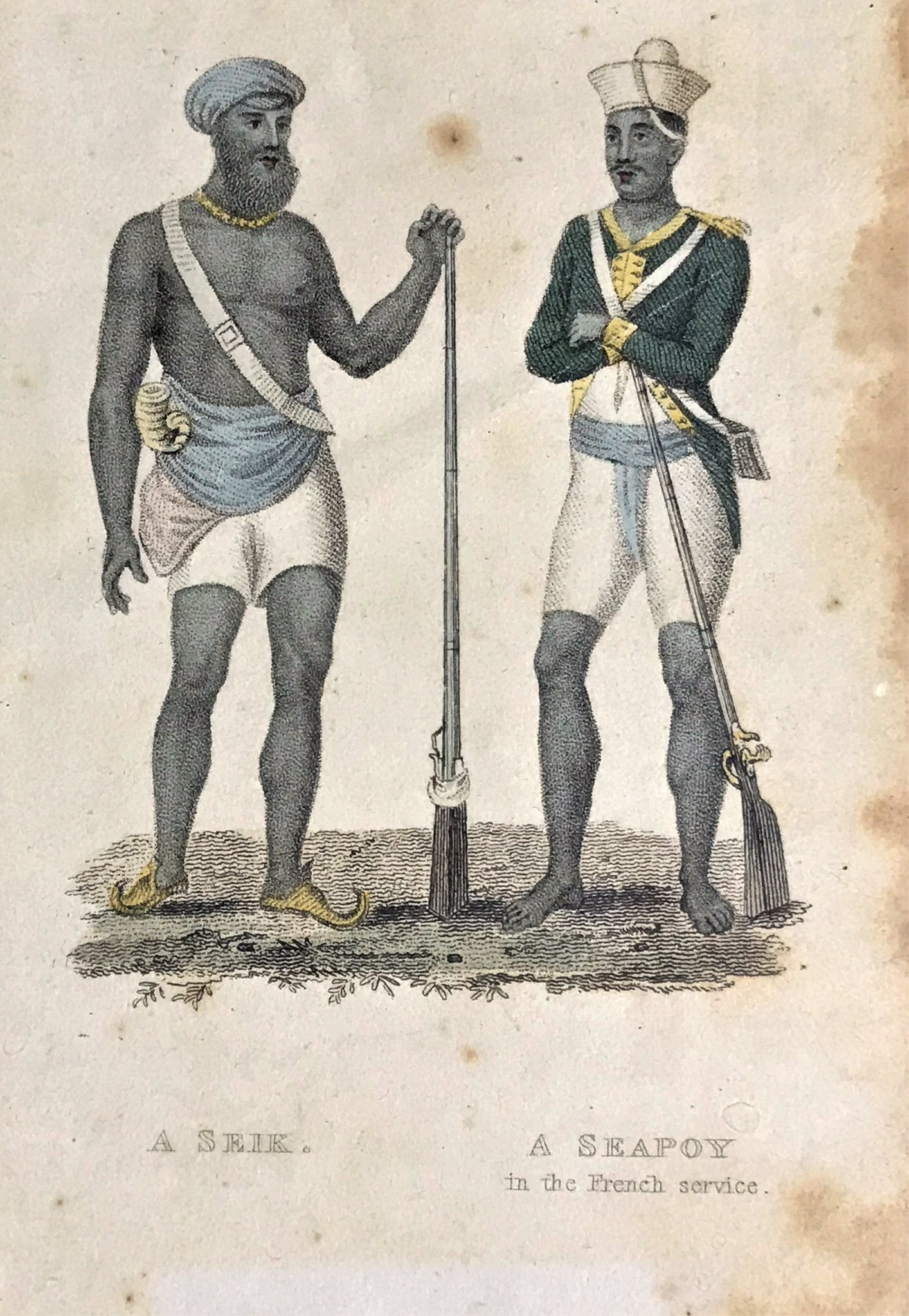
c. 1822 illustration of a French sepoy (right)

Following the formation of the Company of the Indies (Compagnie des Indes) in 1719, companies of Indian sepoys (cipayes) were raised to augment the French regulars and Swiss mercenaries in India. By 1720 the sepoys in French service numbered about 10,000. Although much reduced in numbers after their decisive defeat in India at the Battle of Wandewash in 1760, France continued to maintain a Military Corps of Indian Sepoys (corps militaire des cipayes de l'Inde) in Pondicherry until it was disbanded and replaced by a locally recruited gendarmerie in 1898. The 19th century diplomat Sir Justin Sheil commented about the British East India Company copying the French Indian army in raising an army of Indians:

It is to the military genius of the French that we are indebted for the formation of the Indian army. Our warlike neighbours were the first to introduce into India the system of drilling native troops and converting them into a regularly disciplined force. Their example was copied by us, and the result is what we now behold.

— Sir Justin Sheil (1803–1871).

=== Sepoys in Portuguese service ===
Sepoys were also recruited in Portuguese India. The term cipaio (sepoy) came to be applied by the Portuguese to African soldiers in Angola, Mozambique and Portuguese Guinea, plus African rural police officers, and they saw extensive service in the Portuguese campaigns of pacification and occupation, particularly in Portuguese Mozambique, in campaigns such as the Barue campaign. Cipaios from Angola provided part of the garrison of Goa during the final years of Portuguese rule of that Indian territory.

== Contemporary sepoys ==
The title of "sepoy" is still retained in the modern Nepali Army, Indian Army and Pakistan Army. In each of these it designates the rank of private.

== Other usages ==
The same Persian word reached English via another route in the forms of sipahi and spahi. Zipaio, the Basque version of the word (sometimes also used in its Spanish form, cipayo), is widely used by leftist Basque nationalists as an insult for members of the Basque Police, the term implies that they are not truly a national police force of the Basque Country. It suggests that, despite being Basque citizens themselves, they act as a police force that follows or enforces the orders of the ‘foreign occupier’, namely the Spanish government.

In Hispanic American countries, especially in Argentina, the word cipayo has historically been used as a pejorative colloquial expression referring to individuals considered as serving foreign interests, as opposed to serving their own country.

== See also ==
- Askari – Local soldier of a colonial army in Africa
- Indian Rebellion of 1857, also known as The Sepoy Mutiny – Uprising against British Company rule
- Islamic Revolutionary Guard Corps, also known as Sepah in Persian – Military organization in Iran
- Jawan – Lowest enlisted rank in many armed forces
- Lascar – Sailor or militiaman from South Asia, Southeast Asia, and other territories
- Maharajah and the Sepoys – Variant of chess
- Sowar – Mounted cavalry soldier in South Asia
