= Goa Civil Code =

Indian state civil law

The Goa Civil Code, also called the Goa Family Law, is the set of civil laws that governs the residents of the Indian state of Goa. The Goan civil code was introduced after Portuguese Goa and Daman were elevated from being mere Portuguese colonies to the status of a Província Ultramarina (Overseas possession). The Goan civil code is a Indianised variant of the Portuguese legal system that draws largely from the Napoleonic Code, a common legal system in a number of Continental European nations. Indian law mostly derives from English common law that was formulated and applied in British India, and remains pegged to developments in the "Charter of the British Commonwealth". With a number of amendments, following the Partition of India, Indian laws as a whole have religion-specific civil codes that separately govern adherents of different religions; (like the Muslim and Hindu personal laws) and also has caste reservations. Goa and Daman are an exception to that rule, in that a single code governs all the native Goans and the native Damanese of Daman, Diu & Silvassa, irrespective of affiliation to religion, ethnicity and social strata. The English translation of the civil code is available on the Government of Goa's e-Gazette dated 19/10/2018.

== History ==
The Goa civil code is largely based on the Portuguese Civil Code (Código Civil Português) of 1867, which was introduced in Goa in 1870 (by a Decree of 18 November 1869, the Civil Code of 1867 was extended to the Overseas Provinces of Portugal). Later, the code saw some modifications, based on:

- the Portuguese Gentile Hindu Usages Decrees of 1880 (Código de usos e costumes dos hindus gentios de Goa )

- the Portuguese Decrees on Marriage and Divorce of 1910 (Lei do Divórcio: Decreto de 3 de Novembro de 1910). After the establishment of the First Portuguese Republic, the civil code was liberalized to give women more freedom.
- the Portuguese Decrees on Canonical Marriages of 1946 (Decreto 35.461: regula o casamento nas colónias portuguesas)

The civil code was retained in Goa after its merger with the Indian Union in 1961, although in Portugal, the original Code was replaced by the new Portuguese Civil Code of 1966. In 1981, the Government of India appointed a Personal Law Committee to determine if the non-uniform laws of the Union could be extended to Goa. The Goa Muslim Shariah Organization supported the move, but it was met with stiff resistance from the Muslim Youth Welfare Association and the Goa Muslim Women's Associations.

== Differences with the Indian law ==
Some ways in which the Goa Civil Code is different from other Indian laws include:

- A married couple jointly holds ownership of all the assets owned (before the marriage) or acquired (after the marriage) by each spouse. In case of a divorce, each spouse is entitled to a half share of the assets. However, the law also allows antenuptial agreements, which may state a different division of assets in case of a divorce. These agreements also allow the spouses to hold the assets acquired before marriage separately. Such agreements cannot be changed or revoked. A married person cannot sell the property without the consent of his/her spouse.
- The parents cannot disinherit their children entirely. At least half of their property has to be passed on to the children compulsorily. This inherited property must be shared equally among the children.
- Muslim men, who have their marriages registered in Goa, cannot practice polygamy.

== Uniformity ==
The Goa Civil Code is not strictly a uniform civil code, as it has specific provisions for certain communities. For example:

- The Hindu men have the right to bigamy under specific circumstances mentioned in Codes of Usages and Customs of Gentile Hindus of Goa (if the wife fails to deliver a child by the age of 25, or if she fails to deliver a male child by the age of 30). For other communities, the law prohibits bigamy.
- The Roman Catholics can solemnize their marriages in church after obtaining a No Objection Certificate from the Civil Registrar. For others, only a civil registration of the marriage is accepted as a proof of marriage. The Catholics marrying in the church are excluded from divorce provisions under the civil law.
- For Hindus, divorce is permitted only on the grounds of adultery by the wife.
- The law has inequalities in case of adopted and illegitimate children.

== See also ==
- LGBTQ rights in Goa
