= Anglo-Muhammadan law =

System of English and Islamic legal traditions in the British Empire

Anglo-Muhammadan law was a legal system used in the British Empire which combined British and Islamic law.

== Legal tradition ==
The legal system emerged in British India during the colonial period, integrating elements of both English (Anglo) and Islamic (Muhammadan) legal traditions. It was established by the British colonial authorities to govern the Muslim population of India, alongside other legal systems for different religious communities.

The Anglo-Muhammadan law was based on Islamic law (Sharia) principles but adapted to fit within the broader framework of English common law. British administrators and judges worked to codify and apply Islamic legal principles within the colonial legal system. The goal was to maintain social order and justice while also accommodating the diverse religious and cultural practices within the Indian subcontinent.

Key features of Anglo-Muhammadan law included the recognition of Islamic personal laws in matters such as marriage, inheritance, and family relations. Islamic legal scholars and judges (Qazis) were often involved in the administration of this legal system.

A notable case that involved the application of Anglo-Muhammadan law is the Shah Bano case. The case took place in 1985 and became a significant legal and political controversy in India. The Shah Bano case in 1985 involved a Muslim woman seeking maintenance from her husband under Section 125 of the Code of Criminal Procedure. The Supreme Court initially ruled in her favour, applying Anglo-Muhammadan law. The judgment led to political and religious debates, with some arguing that the court's decision interfered with Islamic personal laws.

== Pre-colonial era ==
Under the Mughals, local laws and customs were combined with the doctrines of Islamic law schools and the Emperor's laws. Administration of justice was centralised in urban areas, and towns with a majority Muslim population retained Muslim courts. while in rural areas, traditional units operated independently.

In 1601, the East India Company were granted limited jurisdiction in some ports by the British crown. The native inhabitants were still subject to local law, but British settlers became subject to English law.

== Colonial rule ==
The first significant changes to the legal system of British India were initiated in the late 18th century by the governor of Bengal Warren Hastings. Hastings' plan of legal reform envisioned a multi-tiered court system for the Muslim population, with a middle tier of British judges advised by local Islamic jurists, and a lower tier of courts operated by qadis. Hastings also commissioned a translation of the classic manual of Hanafi fiqh, Al-Hidayah, from Arabic into Persian and then English, later complemented by other texts. These translations enabled British judges to pass verdicts in the name of Islamic law based on a combination of Sharia rules and common law doctrines, and eliminated the need to rely on consultation by local ulema, whom they mistrusted. In the traditional Islamic context, a concise text like Al-Hidayah would be used as a basis for classroom commentary by a professor, and the doctrines thus learned would be mediated in court by judicial discretion, consideration of local customs and availability of different legal opinions that could fit the facts of the case. The British use of Al-Hidayah, which amounted to an inadvertent codification of Sharia, and its interpretation by judges trained in Western legal traditions anticipated later legal reforms in the Muslim world.

British administrators felt that Sharia rules too often allowed criminals to escape punishment, as exemplified by Hastings' complaint that Islamic law was "founded on the most lenient principles and on an abhorrence of bloodshed". In the course of the 19th century, criminal laws and other aspects of the Islamic legal system in India were supplanted by British law, with the exception of Sharia rules retained in family laws and some property transactions. Among other changes, these reforms brought about abolition of slavery, prohibition of child marriage, and a much more frequent use of capital punishment. The resulting legal system, known as Anglo-Muhammadan law, was treated by the British as a model for legal reforms in their other colonies. Like the British in India, colonial administrations typically sought to obtain precise and authoritative information about indigenous laws, which prompted them to prefer classical Islamic legal texts over local judicial practice. This, together with their conception of Islamic law as a collection of inflexible rules, led to an emphasis on traditionalist forms of Sharia that were not rigorously applied in the pre-colonial period and served as a formative influence on the modern identity politics of the Muslim world.

== See also ==
- Sharia
- Anglo-Hindu law

== Sources ==
- Hallaq, Wael B. (2009b). Sharī'a: Theory, Practice, Transformations. Cambridge University Press (Kindle edition).
- Hallaq, Wael B. (2010). "Islamic Law: History and Transformation". In Robert Irwin (ed.). The New Cambridge History of Islam. Vol. 4. Cambridge University Press.
- Masud, Muhammad Khalid (2009). "Anglo-Muhammadan Law". In Kate Fleet; Gudrun Krämer; Denis Matringe; John Nawas; Everett Rowson (eds.). Encyclopaedia of Islam (3rd ed.). Brill. doi:10.1163/1573-3912_ei3_COM_22716.
- Stewart, Devin J. (2013). "Shari'a". In Gerhard Böwering, Patricia Crone (ed.). The Princeton Encyclopedia of Islamic Political Thought. Princeton University Press.
