= Sapinda =

Cousin, for marriage purposes in Hinduism

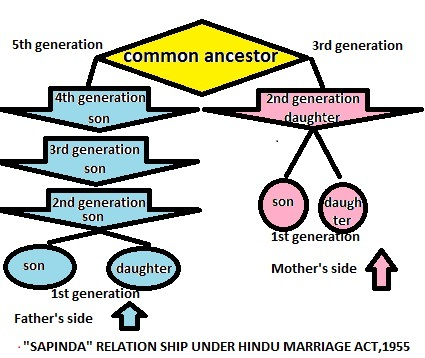
In this diagram all the persons are sapindas of each other.

Sapinda is a term used in Hinduism in the context of cousin marriages. The subject is to be counted as first generation, and the common ancestor defining sapinda limit is to be within sapinda limit.

== Legal explanation ==
Hindu Marriage Act, 1955, section 3 on definitions defines Sapinda in sub-section (f); as mentioned below:

(i) “Sapinda relationship” with reference to any person extends as far as the third generation (inclusive) in the line of ascent through the mother, and the fifth (inclusive) in the line of ascent through the father, the line being traced upward in each case from the person concerned, who is to be counted as the first generation;

(ii) two persons are said to be “sapindas” of each other if one is a lineal ascendant of the other within the limits of sapinda relationship, or if they have a common lineal ascendant who is within the limits of sapinda relationship with reference to each of them;

However, the Manusmriti explains "Sapinda" in Adhyaya 5, Mantra 60, which states,

सपिण्डता तु पुरुषे सप्तमे विनिवर्तते। समानोदकभावस्तु जन्मनाम्नोरवेदने॥

This has been explained as Sapinda relationship ends at seventh generation and absence of knowledge of birth and name of lineal descendant of seventh generation cannot be considered as Sapinda. Therefore, Hindu Marriage Act, 1955 restricts definition of Sapinda only up to third generation of mother and fifth generation of father, which is a more practical approach, as knowledge up to third generation of bride and fifth generation of bridegroom can be easily ascertainable.

== Example ==
For example, if the bride is the offspring of any person within five generations (inclusive) on the Bridegroom's father's side and three generations (inclusive) on the groom's mother's side, or vice versa, they will be referred to as "Sapindas" of each other. In these cases, the Hindu Marriage Act of 1955 bars marriage between two Hindus of this genealogy.

== Conditions for a Hindu marriage ==
Section 5 of the Hindu Marriage Act of 1955 laid down conditions for a Hindu marriage. A marriage may be solemnized between any two Hindus, if the following conditions are fulfilled, namely:-

(i) neither party has a spouse living at the time of the marriage;

(ii) neither party is an idiot or a lunatic at the time of the marriage;

(iii) the bridegroom has completed the age of twenty one years and the bride the age of eighteen years at the time of the marriage;

(iv) the parties are not within the degrees of prohibited relationship, unless the custom or usage governing each of them permits of a marriage between the two;

(v) the parties are not Sapindas of each other, unless the custom or usage governing each of them permits of a marriage between the two

Out of the five above conditions, this article refers to the condition stated under section 5(v), which states that if the Hindu bride and the Hindu groom are "sapindas" of each other, the marriage between the two cannot be solemnized by law and will be legally void.
