= Hindu Succession (Amendment) Act, 2005 =

Act of the Parliament of India

Parliament of India
- Long title: An Act to further amend the Hindu Succession Act, 1956
- Citation: Act No. 39 of 2005
- Enacted by: Parliament of India
- Assented to: 5 September 2005
- Commenced: 9 September 2005

Codification
- Acts amended: Hindu Succession Act, 1956
- Status: In force

The Hindu Succession (Amendment) Act, 2005, is an act of the Parliament of India that amended the Hindu Succession Act, 1956. It received the assent of the President of India on 5 September 2005 and came into force on 9 September 2005. The amendment was primarily aimed at eliminating gender-discriminatory provisions relating to property rights under the Hindu Succession Act, 1956. It marked a revolutionary step in Indian legislation concerning women's rights.

== Key amendments ==
=== Amendment to section 4 of the principal Act ===
In section 4 of the Hindu Succession Act, 1956, sub-section (2) has been omitted.

=== Amendment to Section 6 of the principal Act ===
Section 6 of the principal act has been substituted with the amended provision. It bars courts from "[recognizing] any right to proceed against a son, grandson or great-grandson for the recovery of any debt due from his father, grandfather or great-grandfather solely on the ground of the pious obligation under the Hindu law."

=== Exception ===
The amendment, under clause 5 of section 6, provides an exception for partitions created through deeds under the Registration Act, 1908 or court decrees.

== Key features ==
The amendment has significantly balanced the property rights of male and female siblings. In 2008, the Supreme Court ruled that the law has retrospective effect, and for a daughter to become a co-sharer with her male siblings, it is not required for the father to be alive on 9 September 2005. The Supreme Court also ruled that the amendment applies to all partition suits filed before 2005 and pending at the time the amendment was enacted. The amendment is in consonance with the right of equality as enshrined under Article 14, 15, and 21 of the Constitution of India.
