= Dissolution of Muslim Marriages Act, 1939 =

1939 Indian legislation

The Dissolution of Muslim Marriages Act, 1939 deals with the situations in which Muslim women in India can obtain divorce. Its title and content refer to the Muslim Personal Law (Shariat) Application Act, 1937, which deals with marriage, succession and inheritance among Muslims. The 1939 act (Act No. 8 of 1939) is meant to consolidate and clarify the provisions of Muslim Law relating to suits for dissolution of marriage brought by women married under Muslim Law. The act received assent of the Governor-General on 17 March 1939. In Muslim law, the wife can claim divorce under extrajudicial or judicial modes. The extrajudicial modes are Talaaq-i-tafweez and Lian. The judicial mode is by Dissolution of Muslim Marriages Act 1939. The act defines the grounds for divorce and the procedure that applies. An important aspect of this law is Section 4 that states "The renunciation of Islam by a married Muslim woman or her conversion to faith other than Islam shall not by itself operate to dissolve her marriage".

== Grounds for divorce ==
Under the act, a woman married under Muslim law shall be entitled to obtain a decree for the dissolution of her marriage on any one or more of the following grounds,

(i) that the whereabouts of the husband have not been known for a period of four years;

(ii) that the husband has neglected or has failed to provide for her maintenance for a period of two years;

(iii) that the husband has been sentenced to imprisonment for a period of seven years or upwards;

(iv) that the husband has failed to perform, without reasonable cause his marital obligations for a period of three years; continues to be so:

(v) that the husband was impotent at the time of the marriage and (vi) that the husband has been insane for a period of two years or is suffering from leprosy or a virulent venereal disease;

(vii) that she, having been given in marriage by her father or other guardian before she attained the age of fifteen years, repudiated the marriage before attaining the age of eighteen years : Provided that the marriage has not been consummated;

(viii) that the husband treats her with cruelty that is to say,-

- habitually assaults her or makes her life miserable by ill-treatment, or of conduct even if such conduct does not amount to physical, life, or
- associates with women of evil repute or leads an infamous
- attempts to force her to lead an immoral life, or rights over it, or
- disposes of her property or prevents her exercising her legal practice, or
- obstructs her in the observance of her religious profession or
- if he has more wives than one, does not treat her equitably in accordance with the instructions of the Quran;

(ix) on any other ground which is recognized as valid for the dissolution of marriages under Muslim Law: Provided that,

- no decree shall be passed on ground (iii) until the sentence has become final;
- a decree passed on ground (i) shall not take effect for a period of six months from the date of such decree, and if the husband appears either in person or through an authorized agent within that period and satisfies the Court that he is prepared to perform his conjugal duties, the Court shall set aside the said decree; and
- before passing a decree on ground (v) the Court shall on application by the husband, make an order requiring the husband to satisfy the Court, within a period of one year from the date of such order that he has ceased to be impotent, and if the husband so satisfies the Court within such period, no decree shall be passed on the said ground.

== See also ==
- Muslim personal law in India
