= Hindu Minority and Guardianship Act, 1956 =

Indian federal legislation

Parliament of India
- Long title: An Act to amend and codify certain parts of the law relating to minority and guardianship among Hindus.
- Citation: Act No.32 of 1956
- Territorial extent: whole of India
- Enacted by: Parliament of India
- Enacted: 25 August 1956
- Commenced: 25 August 1956

Amended by
- Pondicherry (Extension of Laws) Act, 1968

Related legislation
- Guardians and Wards Act, 1890

Summary
- Act related to the guardianship of Hindus, as per Hindu Code Bills.
- Status: In force

The Hindu Minority and Guardianship Act, 1956 was enacted as part of the Hindu Code Bills. Three other important acts were also passed during this time: the Hindu Marriage Act, 1955, the Hindu Succession Act, 1956, and the Hindu Adoptions and Maintenance Act, 1956. All of these acts were introduced under the leadership of Jawaharlal Nehru, and were intended to modernize the prevailing Hindu legal tradition. The Hindu Minority and Guardianship Act, 1956 was intended to supplement, rather than replace the Guardians and Wards Act, 1890. This act specifically defines guardianship relationships between adults and minors, as well as between individuals of all ages and their respective property.

== Introduction ==
This act is one of the four Hindu Code Bills codified by the Nehru Administration in 1956. The other three Acts include the Hindu Succession Act, Hindu Adoptions and Maintenance Act, and the Hindu Marriage Act. The Hindu Minority and Guardianship Act delineates the policies regarding minors according to Indian Hindu personal law.

== Important definitions ==
- A minor is a person under the age of 18
- A guardian is the caretaker of a minor, his or her property, or both. Categories of guardians include: a natural guardian; a guardian chosen by the mother or father; a guardian appointed by the court; and a person who qualifies as a guardian according to the Court of Wards.

This Act was intended to be an addendum to the Guardians and Wards Act, 1890, not its replacement.

=== Overriding quality ===
Any former law that is inconsistent with this law is declared legally void. This law supersedes all other relevant laws.

== Application ==
This Act applies to all Hindus, meaning those who belong to the Hindu religion or any of its various forms, such as Lingayat, Virashiva, and those who follow Brahmo, Prarthana or Arya Samaj. It also applies to those who practice Buddhism, Sikhism, and Jainism. Finally, those who are not Muslim, Christian, Parsi or Jewish are governed by this Act unless they can prove that prior to its passage, they were not governed by Hindu law.

Both legitimate and illegitimate minors who have at least one parent meeting the stipulations outlined above fall under the jurisdiction of this Act.

== Natural guardians ==
The father is the primary guardian for a legitimate boy and unmarried girl and their property, while the mother is the secondary guardian. However, the mother is the ordinarily guardian for all children under the age of five. For illegitimate children, the mother is the primary guardian, while the father is the secondary guardian. A married minor girl's husband becomes her guardian. For an adoptive son, the adoptive father is the primary guardian, then the adoptive mother.

Each of these, if they chose, may appoint guardians of their child's person or property.

Should a parent cease being a Hindu or become a renouncer, hermit, or ascetic, that parent will lose his or her guardian rights.

=== Abilities of natural guardians ===
Natural guardians can take actions that will benefit and protect the minor and his or her property. However, the guardian cannot sign a personal covenant for the minor. The guardian cannot sell, mortgage or give away any part of the minor's immovable property, lease this property for more than five years, or lease the property for more than one year after the child becomes eighteen.

== Minors and property ==
A child cannot act as a guardian of property of minors.

For a minor who possesses an undivided interest in joint family property that is already controlled by an adult in that family, a guardian shall not be appointed to manage that undivided interest.

=== Welfare of minor ===
The welfare of the minor will be the primary consideration in the appointment of a guardian.

=== Lacunae ===
Feminist scholars have critiqued the law, arguing that it upholds the rights of fathers rather than mothers as the natural guardians of a child. They argued that it is based on the concept of heterosexual families and ignores diverse family forms. The courts later deduce the principle of the best interests of a minor. Several studies show that single mothers, over the years, have approached the courts and compelled them to acknowledge the rights of mothers to be recognized as a sole guardian of a child.

== Notes ==
http://epgp.inflibnet.ac.in/epgpdata/uploads/epgp_content/women_studies/gender_studies/07._women_and_law/18._womens_right_to_guardianship_and_custody/et/8052_et_et_18.pdf
