= Hindu Marriage Act, 1955 =

Indian federal legislation

Parliament of India
- Long title: An act to amend and codify the law relating to marriage among Hindus.
- Citation: Act No. 25 of 1955
- Territorial extent: whole of India
- Enacted by: Parliament of India
- Enacted: 18 May 1955
- Commenced: 18 May 1955
- Status: In force

The Hindu Marriage Act, 1955 (HMA) is an act of the Parliament of India enacted in 1955. Three other important acts were also enacted as part of the Hindu Code Bills during this time: the Hindu Succession Act, 1956, the Hindu Minority and Guardianship Act, 1956, and the Hindu Adoptions and Maintenance Act, 1956.

== Purpose ==
The main purpose of the act was to amend and codify the law relating to marriage among Hindus and others. Besides amending and codifying Shastrik Law, it also included separation and divorce, which also exist in Shastrik Law. This enactment brought uniformity of law for all sections of Hindus. In India, there are religion-specific civil codes that govern adherents of certain other religions separately.

== Applicability ==
Section 2 of the Hindu Marriage Act, 1955 says:

1. This Act applies
  1. to any person who is a Hindu by religion in any of its forms or developments, including a Virashaiva, a Lingayat or a follower of the Brahmo Samaj, Prarthana Samaj or Arya Samaj;
  2. to any person who is a Buddhist, Jain or Sikh by religion; and
  3. to any other person domiciled in the territories to which this Act extends who is not a Muslim, Christian, Parsi or Jew by religion, unless it is proved that any such person would not have been governed by the Hindu law or by any custom or usage as part of that law in respect of any of the matters dealt with herein if this Act had not been passed.

The Act applies to Hindus outside the territory of India only if they are domiciled in India.

The Act was viewed as conservative because it applied to any person who is Hindu by religion in any of its forms, but it also includes other religions, such as Jains, Buddhists, or Sikhs as specified in Article 44 of the Indian Constitution. However, with the passage of Anand Marriage (Amendment) Bill in 2012, Sikhs now also have their own personal law related to marriage.

A marriage is directly registered by the Registrar of Marriage under section 8 of Hindu Marriage Act, 1955 on the same working day when applied. Verification of all the documents is carried out on the date of application and thereafter the marriage is registered on the same working day by the registrar of marriage appointed by the Government of India and marriage certificate is issued.

== Hindu view of marriage ==
In Hinduism, marriage is a sacred relationship. Traditionally, there was no role for the state in marriage and it was treated as private affair within the social realm. Within this traditional framework, marriage is undoubtedly the most important transition in a Hindu's life and the most important of all the Hindu rites of passage.

The nature of marriage for Hindus was radically changed by the passage of the Hindu Marriage Act (1955), the Special Marriage Act, 1954, which brought marriage into the realm of civil law. It was further changed in 1983 by addition of section 498A to the Indian Penal Code, which aimed to protect married women from cruel treatment by husbands and in-laws. There was fierce religious opposition to the enactment of these laws, and especially to the legal introduction of divorce, which is not permitted in Hinduism. There was also resistance to the principle of equal inheritance by sons and both married and unmarried daughters, contrary to the Hindu view that a married daughter belongs to the family of her husband, not her birth family.

Some have argued that Hindu marriage cannot be subjected to legislative intervention. Duncan Derrett predicted in his later writings that despite some evidence of modernisation, the dominant view in Hindu society for the foreseeable future would remain that marriage is a form of social obligation.

== Conditions ==
Section 5 of Hindu Marriage Act, 1955:

"A marriage may be solemnised between any two Hindus, if the following conditions are fulfilled, namely

1. neither party has a spouse living at the time of the marriage
2. at the time of the marriage, neither party-
  1. is incapable of giving a valid consent to it in consequence of unsoundness of mind; or
  2. though capable of giving a valid consent, has been suffering from mental disorder of such a kind or to such an extent as to be unfit for marriage and the procreation of children;
3. the bridegroom has completed the age of twenty-one years at the time of the marriage;
4. the parties are not within the degrees of prohibited relationship unless the custom or usage governing each of them permits of a marriage between the two;
5. the parties are not sapindas of each other, unless the custom or usage governing each of them permits of a marriage between the two."

== Guardianship ==
Section 6 of the Hindu Marriage Act specifies the bride's guardianship for marriage. Wherever the consent of a guardian in marriage is necessary for a bride under this Act, the persons entitled to give such consent are the following: the father; the mother; the paternal grandfather; the paternal grandmother; the brother by full blood; the brother by half blood; etc. The Guardianship For Marriage was repealed in 1978 after the Child Marriage Restraint Amendment was passed. This amendment increased the minimum age requirement for marriage in order to prevent child marriages.

== Section ==
Section 7 of the Hindu Marriage Act recognises the ceremonies and customs of marriage. Hindu marriage may be solemnised in accordance with the customary rites and ceremonies of either party. Such rites and rituals include the Saptapadi—the taking of seven steps by the bridegroom and the bride jointly around the sacred fire. The marriage becomes complete and binding when the seventh step is taken.

== Registration ==
As stated in Section 8 of the Act, the state government may make rules for the registration of Hindu marriages that the parties to any of such marriages may have particulars relating to their marriages entered in such a manner and subject to such conditions as may be prescribed in the Hindu Marriage Register. This registration is for the purpose of facilitating the proof of Hindu marriages. All rules made in this section may be laid before the state legislature. The Hindu Marriage Register should be open for inspection at all reasonable times and should be admissible as evidence of the statements contained therein.

== Restitution of conjugal rights ==
As stated in section 9 of the act, in cases where either the husband or the wife has withdrawn from the society of the other without reasonable excuse, the aggrieved party may apply to the district court for restitution of conjugal rights. If the court is satisfied with the truth of the statements and finds no legal ground to deny the application, it may decree restitution of conjugal rights.

== Judicial separation ==
Section 10 of the Act also provides for judicial separation, where either party to a marriage can present a petition for a decree of judicial separation. The court has the power to rescind the decree if it deems it just and reasonable to do so.

== Nullification of marriage and divorce ==
Any marriage can be voidable and may be annulled on the following grounds: the marriage has not been consummated due to impotency, may be complete or partial impotency (for example conditions such as impotence quoad hoc), contravention of the valid consent mental illness condition specified in Section 5, or that the respondent at the time of the marriage was pregnant by someone other than the petitioning spouse. Divorce can be sought by husband or wife on certain grounds, including: continuous period of desertion for two or more years, conversion to a religion other than Hindu, mental abnormality, venereal disease, and leprosy. A wife can also present a petition for the dissolution of marriage on the grounds that the husband marries again after the commencement of his first marriage or if the husband has been guilty of rape, sodomy, or bestiality. Newly married couples cannot file a petition for divorce within one year of marriage. There are some exceptions to file a petition within one year of marriage and that are discussed later under section 14.

== Mutual divorce ==
Under section 13 B of the Act, mutual divorce is a provision that allows both the husband and wife to dissolve their marriage by mutual consent. It is a legal procedure that offers an amicable and less adversarial approach to ending a marital relationship. Mutual divorce provides an opportunity for couples to part ways on agreed terms, minimising conflict and emotional distress.

== No petition for divorce to be presented within one year of marriage ==
Under section 14 of the Act, the courts cannot accept a divorce request within one year of marriage, unless a petitioner can demonstrate exceptional hardship or their spouse's exceptional depravity.

== Alimony and maintenance ==
Section 24 of the Hindu Marriage Act, 1955 provides that where either the wife or the husband has no independent income sufficient for their support and the necessary expenses of legal proceedings under the Act, the court may, on application, order the respondent spouse to pay reasonable expenses of the proceeding and monthly maintenance during the pendency of the case. The provision is gender-neutral and is available to either spouse, depending on financial need. Section 25 empowers the court, at the time of passing a decree or at any time thereafter, to grant permanent alimony and maintenance to either the wife or the husband. The court may order a lump-sum payment or periodic payments, having regard to the income and property of both parties, their conduct, and other relevant circumstances. The provision is gender-neutral and aims to provide financial support to a spouse who is unable to maintain themselves adequately following matrimonial proceedings.

== Marriage Laws (Amendment) Bill, 2010 ==
Based on recommendations of the Law Commission, a legislation was proposed. The Marriage Laws (Amendment) Bill, 2010 to amend the Hindu Marriage Act, 1955 and the Special Marriage Act, 1954 to making divorce easier on the grounds of irretrievable breakdown of marriage, was introduced in the parliament in 2012. The Bill replaces the words "not earlier than six months" in Section 13B with the words "upon receipt of a petition."

It also provides a better safeguard to wives by inserting section 13D by which the wife may oppose the grant of a decree on the grounds that the dissolution of the marriage will result in grave financial hardship to her and that it would in all the circumstances be wrong to dissolve the marriage.

New section 13E provides restriction on decree for divorce affecting children born out of wedlock and states that a court shall not pass a decree of divorce under section 13C unless the court is satisfied that adequate provision for the maintenance of children born out of the marriage has been made consistently with the financial capacity of the parties to the marriage.

Marriage Laws (Amendment) Bill, 2010 makes similar amendments to the Special Marriage Act, 1954 by replacing the words "not earlier than six months" in Section 28 with the words "upon receipt of a petition" and provides restriction on decree for divorce affecting children born out of wedlock.

However, there was opposition to this bill due to the objection that it will create hardships for women and that the bill strongly supports one party while both parties should be treated equal in divorce. Therefore, the bill was amended to provide for the wife's consent for waiver of six-month notice with the words "Upon receipt of petitions by the husband and the wife."

The Bill was passed by the Rajya Sabha in 2013, though it was not passed in the Lok Sabha.

Protest against the bill came from men's rights movement groups. Hridaya, a Kolkata-based NGO, demonstrated against the bill. Amartya Talukdar (a men's rights activist) raised concern that the bill introduces no-fault divorce for Hindus only. According to him, "If the Government really wants to bring about empowerment of women, let them make it open for all sections of the society. Let them bring a uniform civil code. Why is it only for the Hindus?"

== Judicial review ==
Shilpa Sailesh v. Varun Sreenivasan: Hon’ble Supreme Court of India held that it can exercise power under Article 142(1) to grant a decree of divorce by mutual consent and can bypass the provisions of section 13B of The Hindu Marriage Act, 1955. Hon’ble Supreme Court of India also recognised its discretionary power to dissolve a marriage on the grounds of irretrievable breakdown, which is otherwise not provided under section 13 of The Hindu Marriage Act, 1955.

=== Devinder Singh Narula v. Meenakshi Nangia ===
The Supreme Court of India exercised its powers under Article 142 of the Constitution of India and ruled in August 2012 that marriages can be ended by mutual consent before expiry of the cooling period of six months stipulated in the Hindu Marriage Act, 1955. Section 13-B of the Hindu Marriage Act provides for the couple seeking divorce through mutual consent to wait for a period of six months after making first joint application for divorce. It is only after the expiry of the six months that the couple can move second application for the dissolution of their marriage.

Pronouncing the judgment, Justice Altamas Kabir said: "It is no doubt true that the legislature had in its wisdom stipulated a cooling period of six months from the date of filing of a petition for mutual divorce till such divorce is actually granted, with the intention that it would save the institution of marriage. But there may be occasions when in order to do complete justice to the parties it becomes necessary for this court to invoke its powers under Article 142 in an irreconcilable situation (between the couple). When it has not been possible for the parties to live together and to discharge their marital obligations towards each other for more than one year, we see no reason to continue the agony of the parties for another two months."

=== Arun Kumar v. Inspector General of Registration ===
A case before the Madras High Court opinioned same-sex marriage within historical Hinduism, that homosexual acts are not forbidden under the Act, and that marriage is a fundamental constitutional right. If literally interpreted, the terms "groom" and "bride" may be viewed as referring to narrow definitions based on genders ("male" and "female"). However, the Hindu Marriage Act was a codification of the ancient Shastrik law by the colonial government for the purpose of regulating issues such as divorce. Application of the "mischief rule" in this situation allows homosexual marriage to be allowed under the current reading of the Hindu Marriage Act, as what "the statute aims at relieving is the regulation of marriage, and not that two same-sex individuals could marry each other. The Act is a codifying statute, and not a penal or disabling statute" and that it was improperly codified.

=== Supriyo v. Union of India ===
While most of the petitioners in the consolidated marriage case requested recognition of marriage under secular marriage laws, some of the Hindu petitioners requested recognition under Hindu Marriage Act. These petitioners include Hindu queer rights activists, such as Abhijit Iyer Mitra, Gopi Shankar Madurai, Giti Thadani and G.Oorvasi. Nibedita Dutta and Pooja Srivastava, a Hindu lesbian couple who got married in Varanasi, Uttar Pradesh. Sameer Samudra and Amit Gokhale, a Hindu gay couple who got married in Columbus, United States. The petition requested the Supreme Court to recognise the marriage between any two persons, regardless of gender identity and sexual orientation, by enforcing the fundamental rights guaranteed under Articles 14, 15, 19, 21 and 25 of the Indian Constitution.

The petitioners argued that they require legal recognition of their marriage because, unlike unregistered opposite-sex married couples, they often encounter officials who question the legitimacy of their relationship. The petitioners had to rely on personal connections and the goodwill of the authorities to access social and economic rights that are automatically available to married couples. To make their case, they presented evidence of the difficulty they faced in simple tasks such as opening joint bank accounts and obtaining proof of residence.

== See also ==
- Prohibition of Child Marriage Act, 2006
- Samskara (rite of passage)
- Dowry system in India
- Hindu marriage laws in Pakistan
- Muslim Women (Protection of Rights on Divorce) Act 1986
- Christian personal law
- Gullipilli Sowria Raj v. Bandaru Pavani
- Hindu personal law
- Mutual Divorce under Hindu Marriage Act
