= Amartya Talukdar =

Indian blogger

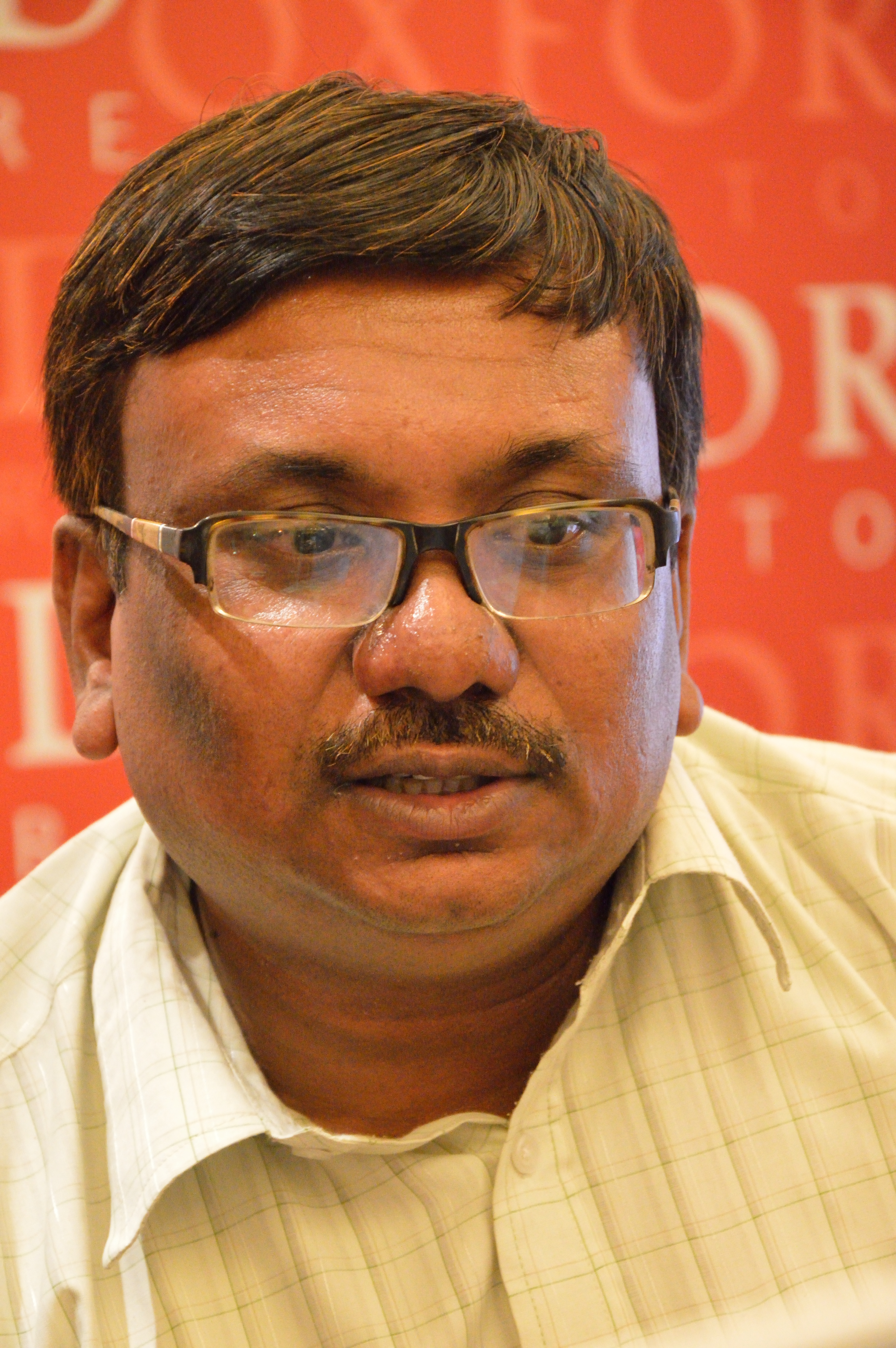
Amartya Talukdar

Amartya Talukdar is a blogger and a men's rights activist. He holds a master's in mechanical engineering from The Institute of Technology, Banaras Hindu University.

== Blogging ==
He won The Times of India award for the most engaging blog at The Apeejay Kolkata Literature Festival. A men's rights activist, his blog advocates altering "lopsided" laws on alimony, dowry and marriage.

== Activism ==
He is the founder member of HRIDAYA, a Men's Right Organization that has spearheaded men's rights movement in West Bengal, a province in India.

HRIDAYA-a nest of family harmony operates under the umbrella of Save Indian Family. It lobbies against gender-biased laws that affect men. HRIDAYA has also called for setting up of a separate ministry for Men's welfare. The NGO also provides help and support to distressed men and their families. It runs a workshop called Hope for Men to coach distressed men to cope with their lives.

Talukdar has organised many street protests against gender-biased laws. He has spoken on men's rights at various places, including the Commerce Fest of St. Xavier's College, Kolkata and TEDxBESC.

== Books ==
- Talukdar, Amartya (2014). MEN'S RIGHT MOVEMENT IN BENGAL. Amartya Talukdar. ISBN 9789351379621.
