= Indian Christian Marriage Act, 1872 =

Act of the Imperial Legislative Council of India

Imperial Legislative Council
- Long title: An Act to consolidate and amend the law relating to the solemnization in India of the marriages of Christians.
- Citation: Act No. 15 of 1872
- Territorial extent: whole of India except the territories which, immediately before the 1st November, 1956, were comprised in the States of Travancore-Cochin, Manipur
- Enacted by: Imperial Legislative Council
- Enacted: 18 July 1872
- Status: In force

The Indian Christian Marriage Act, 1872 is an act of the Imperial Legislative Council governing the legal marriage of Indian Christians. It was enacted on 18 July 1872 and applies throughout India, excluding the territories which, immediately before 1 November 1956, were comprised into the States of Travancore-Cochin and Manipur. Which are now part of present day Kerala, Tamil Nadu (Kanyakumari and Shenkottai) and Manipur.

According to the act, a marriage under the 1872 law is legitimate if at least one of the parties is Christian. An ordained minister of any church in India, a clergyman of the Church of Scotland, a marriage registrar or a special licensee may get an aspiring couple married under the act. The marriage performer issues a marriage certificate. This certificate is recorded with the Registrar of Marriage (who is appointed by the government). As is common in other Indian marriage acts, the minimum age is 21 for the groom and 18 for the bride.

The marriage ceremony must occur between 6 a.m. and 7 p.m., unless the marriage performer secures special permission. The wedding may take place in a church; however, in cases where there is no church within five miles, an appropriate alternative location may be chosen.

== Conditions and requirements ==
The marriage is legitimate only under the following conditions:

- The groom must be at least 21 years old.
- The bride must be at least 18 years old.
- The agreement between the two parties must be free and voluntary and without compulsion, undue influence, or threat of violence.
- The marriage must be witnessed by two reliable eye-witnesses and by a licensed marriage performer.

== Marriage dissolution ==
Christian marriage in India can be dissolved under the Indian Divorce Act of 1869 (under Section X) under three conditions:

- By Section X A (as amended in 2001) both parties can file for a divorce by mutual consent.
- According to Section X (I), either party can file for divorce on the grounds that the other party is of unsound mind. These grounds require two conditions:
  - The party must be medically certified as 'incurable.'
  - The relevant medical symptoms must have been noted at least two years prior to filing for divorce. If the symptoms were treated at any point in time, but ultimately became incurable, the period of two years will be counted from the date when the disease was certified as incurable.
- Women can request a divorce under Section X (II) on three exclusive grounds: rape, sodomy and bestiality.

A woman married under The Indian Christian Marriage Act of 1872 can seek dissolution of her marriage under the Indian Divorce Act of 1869

== Offence ==
Any individual who performs a marriage ceremony when not appropriately licensed by the authorities or recognized by the church can be punished with a term of imprisonment of between seven and ten years.

== Remarriage ==
Under the special marriage act, any woman of any religion can marry or remarry without satisfying any religious ceremony.
