= Gentoo (term) =

Historical European term for Hindus of India

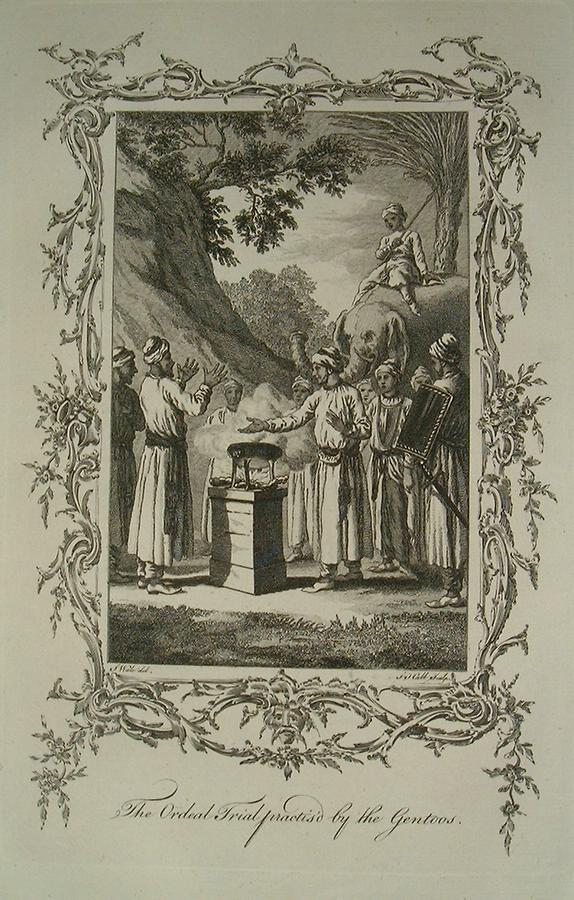
"The Ordeal Trial practis'd by the Gentoos", 1770 copper engraving

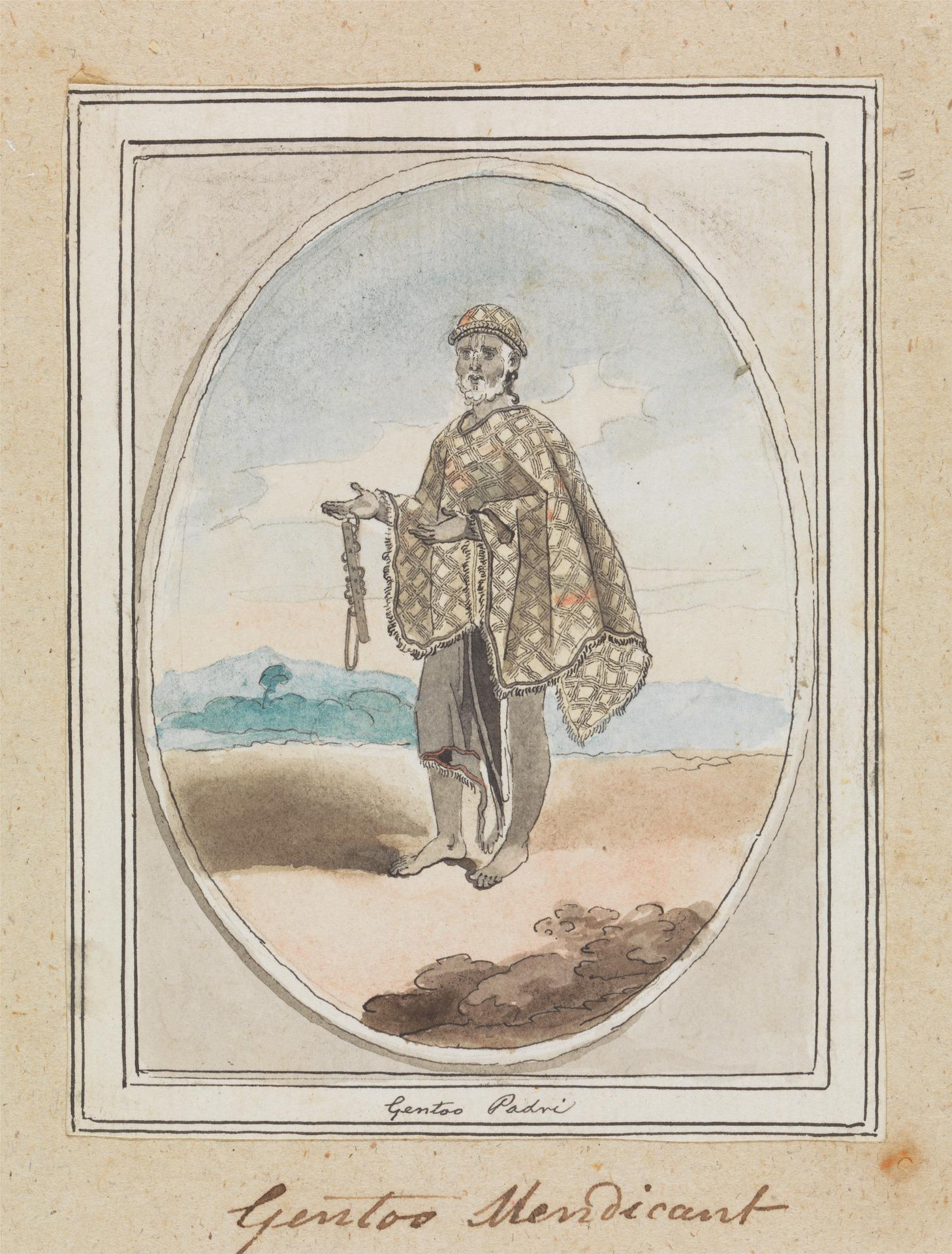
"Gentoo Mendicant", Robert Mabon, 1790s

Gentoo, also spelled Gentue, Gentow or Jentue, was a term used by Europeans for the native inhabitants of India before the word Hindu, with its religious connotation, was used to distinguish a group from Muslims and members of other religious groups in India.

Gentio and Gentoo terms were applied historically to indigenous peoples of India; later, to Telugus and their language in then Madras Province (now the Andhra and Telangana regions), as opposed to the Malbars, or Tamils and their language (in what is now Tamil Nadu). An example from the Monsignor Sebastiao Rodolfo Dalgado is "moros, gentivos e maos christãos". It was also an Anglo-Indian slang term used in the 17th and 18th centuries; however, in the 20th century, the word became derogatory.

== Etymology ==
It is unclear why Indians were called Gentoo. As Portuguese people arrived in India for trade, religious conversions, and colonisation before other Europeans, it is possible that the word was derived from the Portuguese word Gentio: a gentile, a heathen, or native. The Portuguese also appear to have used it to distinguish the inhabitants of India from Muslims, the Moros or Moors.

And before this kingdom of Guzerate fell into the hands of the Moors, a certain race of Gentios whom the moors called Resbutos dwelt therein.

According to 19th century philologist and Orientalist N.B. Halhed, there was a fanciful derivation of Gentoo from the Sanskrit word jantu, meaning "creature".

The word Hindu is not originally Indian. Instead, the word Hindu started to acquire religious connotations only after the arrival of Muslims. The very first attempt by the British to establish social laws on the Indian subcontinent for administrative purposes (in order to assert the distinctiveness of Indian jurisprudence) was named A Code of Gentoo Law. The first digest of Indian legislation was published in 1776, was funded by the East India Company, supported by Warren Hastings, and was translated from Persian into English by Halhed.

The Gentues, the portugal idiom for Gentiles, are the Aborigines, who enjoyed their freedom, till the Moors or Scythian Tartars... undermining them, took advantage of the civil Commotions.

After the term Hindu as a religion was established to represent non-Muslims and non-Christians, the word Gentoo became archaic and then obsolete, while its application on Telugu people and Telugu language (present Andhra region, part of Andhra Pradesh) in then Madras Province continued to distinguish them from Tamil people and Tamil language or Malbars (present: Tamil Nadu) in then Madras Province.

== See also ==
- Anglo-Hindu law
- The Asiatic Society
- Hindoo
