= Hindu code bills =

1950s laws in India

The Hindu code bills were several laws passed in the 1950s that aimed to codify and reform Hindu personal law in India, abolishing religious law in favor of a common law code. The Indian National Congress government led by Prime Minister Jawaharlal Nehru successfully implemented the reforms in 1950s. This process was started during the British rule of India.

After the independence of India, the Nehru administration saw the reform of the Hindu code as necessary for modernising the Hindu society as well as to forge national unity. After facing initial resistance, Nehru campaigned for it during the general election in 1952, and reintroduced the bills which were passed as the Hindu Marriage Act, Hindu Succession Act, Hindu Minority and Guardianship Act, and Hindu Adoptions and Maintenance Act during 1955–1958. These laws apply to all "Hindus", defined expansively to include Jains, Buddhists and Sikhs. Other personal laws inherited from the British rule, for Muslims, Christians and Parsis, remain unreformed, forming an issue of debate among women, religious, and nationalist groups.

== Background ==
While there may be a permanence of certain fundamental beliefs about the nature of life that is pervasive through Hinduism, Hindus as a group are highly non-homogenous. As Derrett says in his book on Hindu law, "We find the Hindus to be as diverse in race, psychology, habitat, employment and way of life as any collection of human beings that might be gathered from the ends of the earth." The Dharmaśāstra—the textual authority on matters of marriage, adoption, the joint family, minorities, succession, religious endowments, and caste privileges—has often been seen as the private law of the Hindus. However, whatever is known and interpreted about this Hindu law is a jumble of rules, and often inconsistent and incompatible with one another, that are lacking in uniformity.

Hindu law's content and structure has ultimately survived as a result of its administration by British judges who gave a lot of attention to Hindu religious-legal texts, while simultaneously invoking English procedure, jurisprudence, and English law to fill any gaps. Opinions often differ as to the extent of the discrepancy between the current law and the public's needs, but most agree that a substantial inconsistency exists.

In 1921, the British Government had already gone so far as to welcome individual Members' efforts at piecemeal codification, a limited but significant shift in policy. According to Levy, that year, "two Hindu legislators, one a lawyer in the Central Legislative Assembly (the lower House), the other an eminent scholar of Sanskrit in the Central Council of States (the upper House), initiated resolutions seeking Government support for a Hindu Code of family law." In the next two decades many such fragmentary measures were enacted, modifying the Hindu law of marriage, inheritance, and joint family property. As a whole, the enacted bills carried further a modest trend toward increasing property alienability, reducing the legal importance of Varna (class), sanctioning religious heterodoxy and conversion and, most significantly, improving the position of women. However, it was the passing of the Hindu Women's Rights to Property Act (Deshmukh Act) in 1937, which had given the widow a son's share in property that was one of the most substantial steps towards the Hindu Code Bill.

== Uniform Civil Code ==
In December 1946, the Constituent Assembly convened to devise a Constitution for the soon-to-be-independent India. Some argued that India's various personal laws were too divisive and that a uniform civil code should be instituted in their place. And once the notion of a uniform civil code was put forward, it soon became accepted as an important part of the effort to construct an Indian national identity, over the separate identities of caste, religion and ethnicity. Some resistance to the code was on the grounds that its imposition would destroy the cultural identity of minorities, the protection of which is crucial to democracy. Certain feminists thus argue that the uniform civil code debate balances on the polarity of the state and community, rendering the gender-based axis upon which it turns, invisible.

A compromise was reached in the inclusion in the first draft of an article that compelled the state "to endeavour to secure for the citizens a uniform civil code throughout the territory of India." The clause, a goal, not a right, became Article 44 in the Constitution. It was widely criticised by proponents of a uniform code because it contained no mechanism and provided no timetable for enforcement. However, Prime Minister Jawaharlal Nehru and others insisted on its inclusion, arguing that even if it was only symbolic, it was an important step towards national unity. Though Nehru himself likely would have favoured a uniform code, he knew that personal laws were linked with religious identity in India and therefore could not be easily abolished. Recognizing that what he wanted was not a political reality, he settled for an unenforceable clause.

== Beginning of codification ==
=== Initial draft ===
In 1941, the colonial government had appointed a four-member Hindu Law Committee, known as the Rau Committee after its chairman B. N. Rau. The committee was to resolve doubts about the Deshmukh Act's construction, ensure that its introduction of new female heirs was not made at the expense of the decedent's own daughter and consider bills introduced to abolish women's limited estate and to make polygamy a ground for separate residence and maintenance. Later in 1941, the Committee reported that the time had come for a Hindu Code. Social progress and modernization could only be achieved by fundamental reforms, which recognized gender equality. The code was to be shaped with the aid of orthodox, conservative and reformist Hindus and by a comprehensive blending of the best of the current schools of Hindu law and the ancient texts.

The 1941 Report was accompanied by two draft bills, each of which was laid before a select committee of both houses of the legislature. Much publicity was given to the project, and as a result of the committees' reports, the Hindu Law Committee itself was revived in 1944 and under its chairman, B. N. Rau, prepared a Draft Code dealing with Succession, Maintenance, Marriage and Divorce, Minority and Guardianship and Adoption. It was that Code that was widely circulated and discussed and given the name "Hindu Code Bill". After publication in twelve regional languages and a wide publicity campaign, the Rau Committee toured the country and examined witnesses. The result 1947 report of the committee included and went far beyond the 1941 proposals, recommending the abolition of the joint-family property system, the introduction of the daughter's simultaneous succession with the son to the father's estate, the abolition of the barrier to intercaste marriages, the assimilation of civil and sacramental marriages, and the introduction of divorce. It was the intention of the government that this first draft should become law on 1 January 1948, but the whole project was temporarily suspended when independence led to the priorities of the legislature to be consumed with the task of creating the new regime.

By 1943, a significant opposition to the code had begun to develop inside and outside the Legislature. In the 1943–44 legislative debate, opponents and supporters alike accepted as fact the view that the majority of the legal profession continued to support the code. Opponents tried to undercut the perceived support by arguing that lawyers had become westernized or that the merits of the bill were for the people to decide, not lawyers. Nehru had already been forced to retreat from an original position of passing the bill. However, his position greatly improved in 1951 when he succeeded Purushottam Das Tandon as Congress president. He chose not to test his combined powers as prime minister and party president, in regard to the bill at that time and allowed it to lapse. He, however, promised fellow supporters that he would campaign on the bill, with plain arguments on the merits.

=== Dr B.R Ambedkar's draft ===
The Ministry of Law revised the first draft in 1948 and made some small alterations to it, making it more suitable for discussion in the Constituent Assembly, where it was finally introduced. It was referred to a select committee under the chairmanship of law minister Dr. B. R. Ambedkar, and the committee made a number of important changes in the Bill. This edition had eight sections: part one delineated who would be considered a Hindu and did away with the caste system. Significantly, it stipulated that the Hindu Code would apply to anyone who was not a Muslim, Parsi, Christian, or Jew, and asserted that all Hindus would be governed under a uniform law. Part two of the bill concerned marriage; part three adoption; part four, guardianship; part five the policy on joint-family property, and was controversial as it included the nontraditional allocation of property to women. Part six concerned policies regarding women's property, and parts seven and eight established policies on succession and maintenance. By allowing for divorce, Ambedkar's version of the Hindu Code conflicted with traditional Hindu personal law, which did not sanction divorce (although it was practiced). It also "established one joint family system of property ownership for all Hindus" by doing away with regional rules. Finally, it allotted portions of inheritance to daughters, while giving widows complete property rights where they had previously been restricted.

Conflicts also arose from the categorization of who would be considered Hindu. The Code established "Hindu" to be a negative category that would include all those who did not identify as a Muslim, Jew, Christian, or Zoroastrian. Those who practised Sikhism, Jainism, and Buddhism were considered to be Hindus under the jurisdiction of the Code Bill. While they had originally included aspects of Hinduism, by then, they had evolved into unique religions with their own customs, traditions, and rituals. There was also significant controversy over what was established to be Hindu personal law. Sanctioned under Hinduism were a variety of practices and perspectives. Therefore, the administration had to arbitrate between these variations, legitimating some and disregarding or marginalising others.

=== Further revisions and passing ===
The draft that Ambedkar submitted to the Constituent Assembly was opposed by several sections of lawmakers. The motion to begin discussion on the Hindu Code Bill was debated for over fifty hours, and discussion was postponed for over a year. Realizing that he would have to make significant concessions to get the bill passed, Nehru suggested that the proposed law be split into several sections. He told the Constituent Assembly they would contend with only the first 55 clauses concerning marriage and divorce, while the rest would be considered by the Parliament of India after the first general election. However, the compromise was largely ineffective in convincing conservatives to support the bill. When only 3 of the 55 clauses passed after an additional week of debating, Nehru had Ambedkar's committee distribute a new draft that complied with many of the critics' demands, including the reinstitution of the Mitākṣarā joint family system, an amendment to allow for brothers to buy out daughters' share of the inheritance, and a stipulation allowing divorce only after three years of marriage. However, after the bills were defeated again in the assembly, Ambedkar resigned. In a letter that he released to the press, he held that his decision was largely based on the treatment that had been accorded to the Hindu Code Bill as well as the administration's inability to get it passed.

In 1951–52, India held its first general elections. Nehru made the Hindu Code Bill one of his top campaign initiatives, declaring that should the Indian National Congress win, he would succeed in getting it passed through parliament. Congress won sweeping victories, with Nehru reinstated as prime minister, and he began a comprehensive effort to devise a Bill that could be passed. Nehru split the Code Bill into four separate bills, including the Hindu Marriage Act, the Hindu Succession Act, the Hindu Minority and Guardianship Act, and the Hindu Adoptions and Maintenance Act. These were met with significantly less opposition, and between the years of 1952 and 1956, each was effectively introduced in and passed by Parliament.;

== Intentions ==
As Mansfield writes regarding the need for personal laws in India — "The spectacle of large political entities in different parts of the world collapsing and giving place to smaller entities based on ethnicity, religion or language or combinations of these factors, rather than strengthening the idea that a powerfully centralised, culturally homogenous nation is essential for order and prosperity, may have confirmed for some the view that the pressing task for India is not to increase central power and cultural homogeneity, but to find an alternative to the 'nation-state' model, an alternative that will sustain unity through some form of 'pluralism'."

Nehru's primary purpose in instituting the Hindu code bills was to unify the Hindu community, so it made sense to define Hindu in the broadest possible sense. By legal equity, Nehru intended to "erase distinctions within the Hindu community and create Hindu social unity.... The integration of Hindus into a homogeneous society could best be done by enacting an all-embracing code which encompasses within its fold every sect, caste, and religious denomination." The debates over Article 44 in the Constitution revealed that many believed varied laws and legal divisions helped create or at least were reflective of social divisions. Nehru and his supporters insisted that the Hindu community, which comprised 80% of the Indian population, first needed to be united before any actions were taken to unify the rest of India. Therefore, the codification of Hindu personal law became a symbolic beginning on the road to establishing the Indian national identity. Nehru also felt that because he was Hindu, it was his prerogative to codify a specifically Hindu law, as opposed to Muslim or Jewish law.

Those in Parliament who supported the bills also saw them as a vital move towards the modernization of Hindu society, as they would clearly delineate secular laws from religious law. Many also heralded the bills' opportunity to implement greater rights for women, which were established to be necessary, for India's development.

== Support and opposition ==
During the debates over the Hindu code bills in the General Assembly, large segments of the Hindu population protested and held rallies against the bills. Numerous organizations were formed to lobby for the defeat of the bills and massive amounts of literature were distributed throughout the Hindu population. In the face of such vocal opposition, Nehru had to justify the passage of the Hindu code bills. Earlier, he had stated that in accordance with the policy of noninterference, he was undertaking codification in compliance with a demand from the Hindu community. When it became clear that the vast majority of Hindus did not support the Bills, he insisted that though they were a minority, those who supported the Bills were modern and progressive and so held vital weight in the Hindu community, in importance if not in numbers. He also argued that because the bill's supporters were progressive, those who dissented would eventually change their position when confronted with the realities of modernity.

Proponents included both men and women within and outside of Parliament belonging to various political parties. Significant support for the bills came from Congress' women's wing (All-India Women's Conference) and several other women's organizations. Supporters largely sought to convince the public that the bills did not stray far from classical Hindu personal law. Essentially, those in Parliament who opposed the bills were men, largely from Nehru's own Congress party. They believed that the code bills would institute reform that strayed too far from the classical Hindu social order and were too radical. They argued that practices such as divorce were absolutely not condoned by Hinduism. "To a Hindu the marriage is sacramental and as such indissoluble." They also felt that should equal property rights be given to women, the Mitākṣarā concept of a joint family would crumble, as would the foundation of Hindu society. They also insisted that if daughters and wives were given inheritance, more conflicts would arise within families. Their main argument, however, was that the bills lacked public support. Therefore, they were a direct contradiction to the policy of noninterference and would mean the government was meddling in personal law. They implied that these were bills propagated by a small minority of Hindus onto the majority who did not want them.

== Today ==
The application of the Hindu Code Bills has been controversial in determining who is to be called a Hindu and who is entitled to be exempted from certain rules of Hindu law.

They are also still contentious among many communities, including women's, nationalist and religious groups. At the time of their creation, many portrayed them as a serious deviation from Hindu legal precedent. Feminists, such as Nivedita Menon, argue that since the personal laws cover matters of marriage, inheritance and guardianship of children, and since all personal laws discriminate against women, the tension within the laws is a contradiction between the rights of women as individual citizens and those of religious communities as collective units of the democracy. In her 1998 article "State, Gender, Community: Citizenship in Contemporary India", she calls for more support and initiation for reform within all personal laws and more legislation in areas that are not covered by secular or personal laws, such as domestic violence. She also argues for a gender-equal framework of rights that covers the "public" domain of work (maternity benefits, equal wages) and is available to all Indian citizens, thus avoiding a direct confrontation with communities and communal politics.

== Bibliography ==
- Larson, Gerald James, ed. (2001), Religion and Personal Law in Secular India: A Call to Judgment, Indiana University Press, ISBN 0-253-21480-7
- Smith, Donald Eugene (1963), India as a Secular State, Princeton University Press, ISBN 978-1-4008-7778-2
- Williams, Rina (2006). Postcolonial Politics and Personal Laws. New Delhi: Oxford University Press.
