= Gentoo Code =

Legal code translated from Sanskrit

The Gentoo Code (also known as A Code of Gentoo Laws or Ordinations of the Pundits) is a legal code translated from Sanskrit (in which it was known as vivādārṇavasetu) into Persian by Brahmin scholars; and then from Persian into English by Nathaniel Brassey Halhed, a British grammarian working for the East India Company. Vivādārṇavasetu is a digest of Hindu law in 21 sections (taraṅga) compiled for Warren Hastings by the pandits. The translation was funded and encouraged by Warren Hastings as a method of consolidating company control on the Indian subcontinent. It was translated into English with a view to know about the culture and local laws of various parts of Indian subcontinent. It was printed privately by the East India Company in London in 1776 under the title A Code of Gentoo Laws, or, Ordinations of the Pundits. Copies were not put on sale, but the Company did distribute them. In 1777 a pirate (and less luxurious) edition was printed; and in 1781 a second edition appeared. Translations into French and German were published in 1778. It is basically about the Hindu law of inheritance (Manusmriti). The Pandits and the Maulvis were associated with judges to understand the civil law of Hindus and Muslims.

The resulting "Anglo-Brahminical" output completely violated the spirit of actual practice. This is because the eleven pandits (Brahmin scholars) hired by Warren Hastings "took advantage of the assignment to favour their own caste, by interpreting and even creating sacrosanct 'customs' that in fact has no shastric authority". The result was a magnification of the problem of caste hierarchy in India – an issue still extant today.

== See also ==
- List of ancient legal codes
