= Special Marriage Act, 1954 =

Indian Marriage Law

Parliament of India
- Long title: An Act to provide a special form of marriage on certain cases, for the registration of such and certain other marriages and for divorce.
- Citation: No.43 of 1954
- Enacted by: Parliament of India
- Assented to: 9 October 1954
- Commenced: 1 January 1955
- Status: In force

The Special Marriage Act, 1954 is an act of the Parliament of India with provision for secular civil marriage (or "registered marriage") for people of India and all Indian nationals in foreign countries, irrelevant of the religion or faith followed (both for inter-religious couples and also for atheists and agnostics) by either party. The Act originated from a piece of legislation proposed during the late 19th century. Marriages solemnized under Special Marriage Act are not governed by personal laws and are considered to be secular.

== Background ==
Henry Sumner Maine first introduced Act III of 1872, which would permit any dissenters to marry whomever they choose under a new civil marriage law. In the final wording, the law sought to legitimize marriages for those willing to renounce their profession of faith altogether ("I do not profess the Hindu, Christian, Jewish, etc. religion"). It can apply in inter-caste and inter-religion marriages. The Bill faced opposition from local governments and administrators, who believed that it would encourage marriages based on lust, which would inevitably lead to immorality.

The Special Marriage Act, 1954 replaced the old Act III, 1872. The new enactment had three major objectives:

1. To provide a special form of marriage in certain cases,
2. to provide for registration of certain marriages and,
3. to provide for divorce.

== Applicability ==
1. Any person, irrespective of religion.
2. Hindus, Muslims, Buddhists, Jains, Sikhs, Christians, Parsis, or Jews.
3. Inter-religion marriages.
4. Entire territory of India and extends to intending spouses who are both Indian nationals living abroad.
5. Indian national living abroad.
6. Foreign national and Indian national within India.

== Procedure ==
The marriage performed under the Special Marriage Act, 1954 is a civil contract. There is no need for rites or wedding ceremonies.

The parties have to file a Notice of Intended Marriage on a specified form to the Marriage Registrar of the district in which one of the parties resides. The party must have resided there for at least thirty days immediately preceding the filing.

The notice is published and a thirty-day waiting period is required during which objections may be raised to the marriage. At the conclusion of the waiting period, the marriage may be solemnised at a specified Marriage Office.

Marriage is solemnised by each party declaring "I, (A), take thee (B), to be my lawful wife (or husband)," in the presence of the Marriage Officer and three witnesses. A marriage certificate is issued directly by the Registrar of Marriage appointed by the Govt. of India.

== Conditions for marriage ==
1. Each party involved should have no other subsisting valid marriage. In other words, the resulting marriage should be monogamous for both parties.
2. The groom must be at least 21 years old; the bride must be at least 18 years old.
3. The parties should be competent in regard to their mental capacity to the extent that they are able to give valid consent for the marriage.
4. The parties should not fall within the degree of prohibited relationship.

== Succession to the property ==
Succession to the property of person married under this Act or customary marriage registered under this Act and that of their children, are governed by Indian Succession Act. However, if the parties to the marriage are Hindu, Buddhist, Sikh or Jain religion, the succession to their property will be governed by Hindu succession Act.

The Supreme Court of India, in 2006, made it required to enroll all relational unions. In India, a marriage can either be enlisted under the Hindu Marriage Act, 1955 or under the Special Marriage Act, 1954. The Hindu Marriage Act is pertinent to Hindus, though the Special Marriage Act is appropriate to all residents of India regardless of their religion applicable at Court marriage.

== Judicial review ==
=== Supriyo v. Union of India ===
The petition requested the Supreme Court to recognise the marriage between any two persons, regardless of gender identity and sexual orientation, and declare the notice and objection provisions as void, by enforcing the fundamental rights guaranteed under Articles 14, 15, 19 and 21 of the Indian Constitution.

Nikesh P.P. & Sonu M.S filed a petition with Kerala High Court on 24 January 2020. Dr Kavita Arora & Ankita Khanna filed a petition with Delhi High Court on 8 October 2020 and they were joined by other petitioners over the course of time. On 6 January 2023, their petitions were transferred to Supreme Court to be heard along with Supriyo v. Union of India (2023). Additionally, most of the petitioners challenged the notice and objection provisions of the Special Marriage Act and the Foreign Marriage Act of 1969 which hurt vulnerable minorities.

== See also ==
- Dowry law in India
