= Hindu personal law =

Set of laws that govern Hindus in India

Hindu personal laws are the laws of the Hindus as they applied during the colonial period (British Raj) of India beginning from the Anglo-Hindu Law to the post-independent secular law. The British found neither a uniform canon administering law for the diverse communities of India nor a Pope or a Shankaracharya whose law or writ applied throughout the country. Due to discrepancies in opinions of pandits on the same matter, the East India Company began training pandits for its own legal service leading to the setting up of a Sanskrit College in Banaras and Calcutta, to help them arrive at a definitive idea of the Indian legal system. It is from here that the Hindu Personal Law had its beginning; and more appropriately so in 1772, when Warren Hastings appointed ten Brahmin pandits from Bengal to compile a digest of the Hindu scriptural law in four main civil matters—marriage, divorce, inheritance and succession. The Hindu Personal Laws underwent major reforms over a period of time, and created social and political controversies throughout India.

== Effects ==
The Hindu Personal Laws beginning with the creation of the Anglo-Hindu Law lead to widespread changes, controversies and civil suits in Hindu society across all strata and in monastic orders. Between 1860 and 1940, the issue of succession in the Anglo-Hindu Law led to legal issues of ownership and distribution of property in ascetic-run institutions. The early twentieth century witnessed ascetic orders seeking to 'purify' their genealogies through the medium of property disputes fought in colonial courts, which also led to the removal of women and children from certain ascetic orders with varying degrees of success.

== See also ==
- Christian personal law
- Muslim personal law
- Special Marriage Act, 1954
- Hindu Marriage Act, 1955
- Hindu Succession Act, 1956
- Uniform civil code
