= Hindu Succession Act, 1956 =

Act of the Parliament of India

Parliament of India
- Long title: An Act to amend and codify the law relating to intestate succession among Hindus.
- Citation: Act 30 of 1956
- Territorial extent: whole of India
- Enacted by: Parliament of India
- Enacted: 17 June 1956
- Commenced: 17 June 1956

Repeals
- Hindu Law of Inheritance (Amendment) Act, 1929; Hindu Women's Rights to Property Act, 1937

Amended by
- Hindu Adoptions and Maintenance Act, 1956; Repealing and Amending Act 1960; Repealing and Amending Act, 1974; Hindu Succession (Amendment) Act, 2005
- Status: In force (amended)

The Hindu Succession Act, 1956 is an Act of the Parliament of India enacted to amend, codify and secularize the law relating to intestate or unwilled succession, among Hindus, Buddhists, Jains, and Sikhs. The Act lays down a uniform and comprehensive system of inheritance and succession into one Act. The Hindu woman's limited estate is abolished by the Act. By virtue of this Act, any property possessed by a Hindu female is to be held by her as absolute property, and she is conferred full power to deal with and dispose of it, including by will, as she pleases. Some parts of this Act were amended in December 2004 by the Hindu Succession (Amendment) Act, 2005.

== Applicability ==
=== As per religion ===
This Act applies to the following:

- any person who is a Hindu by religion in any of its forms or developments including a Virashaiva, a Lingayat or follower of the Brahmo, Prarthana or Arya Samaj;
- any person who is Buddhist, Sikh, Jain by religion; and
- to any other person who is not a Muslim, Christian, Parsi, or Jew by religion unless it is proved that the concerned person would not have been governed by the Hindu Law or by any custom or usage as part of that law in respect of any of the matters dealt with herein if this Act had not been passed.

Explanation as to who shall be considered as Hindus, Buddhists, Jains, or Sikhs by religion has been provided in the section:

- any child, legitimate or illegitimate, both of whose parents are Hindus, Buddhists, Jains, or Sikhs by religion;
- any child, legitimate or illegitimate, one or of whose parents is a Hindu, Buddhist, Jain or Sikh by religion and who is brought up as a member of the tribe, community, group or family to which such parent belongs or belonged;
- any person who is converted or re-converted to the Hindu, Buddhist, Jain, or Sikh religion.

A person shall be treated as a Hindu under the Act though he may not be a Hindu by religion but is, nevertheless, a person to whom this Act applies under the provisions contained in this section.

=== As per tribe ===
However, it has been provided that notwithstanding the religion of any person as mentioned above, the Act shall not apply to the members of any Scheduled Tribe within the meaning of clause (25) of Article 366 of the Constitution of India unless the Central Government, by notification in the Official Gazette, otherwise directs. Surajmani Stella Kujur Vs. Durga Charan Hansdah-SC

== In the case of males ==
The property of a Hindu male dying intestate, or without a will, would be given first to heirs within Class I. If there are no heirs categorized as Class I, the property will be given to heirs within Class II. If there are no heirs in Class II, the property will be given to the deceased's agnates or relatives through male lineage. If there are no agnates or relatives through the male's lineage, then the property is given to the cognates or any relative through the lineage of females.

There are two classes of heirs that are delineated by the Act.

Class I heirs are sons, daughters, widows, mother and grandchildren

If there is more than one widow, multiple surviving sons, or multiples of any of the other heirs listed above, each shall be granted one share of the deceased's property. Also if the widow of a pre-deceased son, the widow of a pre-deceased son of a pre-deceased son, or the widow of a brother has remarried, she is not entitled to receive the inheritance.

Class II heirs are categorized as follows and are given the property of the deceased in the following order:

1. Father
2. Son's/daughter's son
3. Son's/daughter's daughter
4. Brother
5. Sister
6. Daughter's/son's son
7. Daughter's/son's daughter
8. Daughter's/daughter's son
9. Daughter's/daughter's daughter
10. Brother's son
11. Sister's son
12. Brother's daughter

== In the case of females ==
Under the Hindu Succession Act, 1956, females are granted ownership of all property acquired either before or after the signing of the Act, abolishing their "limited owner" status. However, it was not until the 2005 Amendment that daughters were allowed equal receipt of property as with sons. This invariably grants females property rights.

The property of a Hindu female dying intestate, or without a will, shall devolve in the following order:

1. upon the sons and daughters (including the children of any pre-deceased son or daughter) and the husband,
2. upon the heirs of the husband,
3. upon the father and mother,
4. upon the heirs of the father, and
5. upon the heirs of the mother.

== Certain exceptions ==
Any person who commits murder is disqualified from receiving any form of inheritance from the victim.

If a relative converts from Hinduism, he or she remains eligible for inheritance. The descendants of that converted relative, however, are disqualified from receiving an inheritance from their Hindu relatives, unless they have converted to Hinduism before the death of the relative.

== Amendment ==
The Hindu Succession (Amendment) Act, 2005, amended Section 4, Section 6, Section 23, Section 24 and Section 30 of the Hindu Succession Act, 1956. It revised rules on coparcenary property, giving daughters of the deceased equal rights with sons, and subjecting them to the same liabilities and disabilities. The amendment essentially furthers equal rights between Hindu males and females in society through legislation.

== See also ==
- Hindu personal law
- Uniform civil code
