= Devu G. Nair v. State of Kerala =

Indian LGBT Rights Case Law

- Court: Supreme Court of India
- Full case name: Devu G. Nair versus State of Kerala & Ors.
- Decided: TBA
- Citations: S.L.P(Crl.) No. 1891/2023; Diary No. 5027/2023

Case history
- Prior actions: WP(Crl.) No. 28 of 2023: 13 January 2023; District Legal Services Authority to ascertain the legality of alleged detainee's detention at the residence of alleged detainers.: 2 February 2023; Alleged detainee in a same-sex relationship must attend counseling, with option for alleged detainers to accompany her.
- Appealed from: Kerala High Court

Court membership
- Judges sitting: DY Chandrachud CJI., P. S. Narasimha J., J.B. Pardiwala J.

Case opinions
- Decision by: DY Chandrachud CJI., P. S. Narasimha J., J.B. Pardiwala J.

Keywords
- Cohabitation Rights, Same-sex Relationship, Conversion Therapy

Devu G. Nair versus State Of Kerala & Ors. (2023) is an ongoing Supreme Court case, poised to examine the legality of Conversion Therapy and addressing whether the High Court should have facilitated the alleged detainee's opportunity to provide their statement in person within the secure confines of the High Court building.

== Background ==
The petitioner, Devu G. Nair, is engaged in a consensual same-sex relationship with U. Sreerenjini, an alleged detainee of 23 years, who is presently being held by her parents under purported false circumstances to separate her from Devu G. Nair since 9 January 2023. As a response, Devu G. Nair has initiated a legal action by filing a petition in the Kerala High Court, seeking a writ of Habeas Corpus to demand U. Sreerenjini's presence and secure her release.

== Kerala High Court ==
=== Proceedings ===
On 13 January 2023, a two-judge Bench of the Kerala High Court, comprising Judge Alexander Thomas and Judge C.S. Sudha, issued an order directing the Secretary of the District Legal Services Authority in Kollam to visit the parents' residence of alleged detainee U. Sreerenjini, aiming to record her statement and ascertain the legality of her detention by her parents. The Bench ordered that if the statement suggests U. Sreerenjini's unlawful detention, her presentation before the High Court by 19 January 2023, is required. Conversely, the Bench noted that unless U. Sreerenjini's statement denies unlawful detention, her appearance before the Kerala High Court is unnecessary.

When the Secretary of the District Legal Services Authority of Kollam visited the home of U. Sreerenjini's parents, who were the alleged detainers, alleged detainee U. Sreerenjini provided a statement affirming her romantic involvement with the petitioner Devu G. Nair but refuted any claim of unlawful detention by her parents.

On 31 January 2023, the Bench, without delving into the specifics of U. Sreerenjini's statement to the Secretary of District Legal Services Authority of Kollam, directed the Station House Officer of Kollam West Police Station to ensure U. Sreeranjini's presence before the Secretary of District Legal Services Authority of Kollam on 2 February 2023, for a direct video conference between the Kerala High Court and U. Sreeranjini.

The petitioner Devu G. Nair asserted that during U. Sreerenjini's virtual appearance before the Kerala High Court, U. Sreerenjini explicitly conveyed her romantic affection for Devu G. Nair and expressed a desire to reside with her.

=== Interim Order ===
On 2 February 2023, a two-judge Bench of the Kerala High Court, comprising Judge Alexander Thomas and Judge C.S. Sudha, without examining the content of the statement furnished by the alleged detainee U. Sreerenjini to the Kerala High Court, found it suitable for U. Sreerenjini to receive counseling at an authorized center. Accordingly, the Bench directed the Secretary of the District Legal Services Authority of Kollam to facilitate U. Sreerenjini's counseling sessions with a psychologist attached to a Kollam counseling center over the next four or five days. Furthermore, the Bench ruled that U. Sreerenjini's parents, who are the alleged detainers, could accompany her to the counseling center.

== Supreme Court ==
=== Special leave to appeal ===
The special leave to appeal does not grant an automatic right to appeal but rather provides the right to request special leave to appeal. The Supreme Court, recognizing its exceptional and supreme authority in granting special leave to appeal, employs this discretionary jurisdiction with care, preserving it for rare and exceptional situations to prevent the continuation of injustice. To qualify for the special leave to appeal, the legal question raised in the petition must be of significant importance, either with broad public implications or with a direct and substantial impact on the rights of the parties involved. Additionally, the Supreme Court's intervention becomes necessary when different High Courts hold conflicting views on the same legal question.

==== Petition ====
The petitioner's counsel has filed a special leave petition, seeking to contest the interim orders issued by the Kerala High Court on 13 January 2023, and 2 February 2023, raising legal questions concerning the validity of 'conversion therapy,' and whether the High Court should have facilitated the alleged detainee's opportunity to provide their statement in person within the secure confines of the High Court building. Furthermore, the counsel argued that interim orders deprived the petitioner and the alleged detainee of fundamental rights, spanning from 9 January 2023, to the present.

===== Conversion therapy =====
The counsel contested an interim order issued by the Kerala High Court on 2 February 2023, which mandated that the alleged detainee involved in a same-sex relationship must participate in counseling sessions with a psychologist. The counsel argued that it was inherently flawed and in conflict with legal principles. The petitioner's argument was based on the claim that the counseling sessions provided to a detainee in a same-sex relationship essentially intended to alter the detainee's sexual orientation.

The counsel pointed out a notable discrepancy between two interim orders issued by the Kerala High Court and the Madras High Court concerning the legality of 'conversion therapy.' In the Madras High Court case of S Sushma v. Commissioner of Police (2021), a ruling on 7 June 2021, declared that any attempts to medically change the sexual orientation or gender identity of queer individuals to heterosexual and cisgender identities should be prohibited. The Madras High Court instructed the National Medical Commission to take measures against professionals engaged in any form of 'conversion therapy,' which could involve revoking their license to practice. Consequently, on 2 September 2022, the National Medical Commission formally classified the practice of 'conversion therapy' as a type of professional misconduct, thereby granting State Medical Councils the authority to take punitive measures against medical professionals engaging in 'conversion therapy.'

In light of these circumstances, the counsel sought a definitive determination regarding the legality of 'Conversion Therapy.'

===== Habeas Corpus =====
The counsel contested an interim order issued by the Kerala High Court on 13 January 2023, instructing the District Legal Service Authority to record the statement of the detainee, at the residence of alleged detainers. The counsel contended that this approach did not serve the purpose and invoked the principle of habeas corpus. According to the detainee's statement to the District Legal Service Authority, she confirmed her romantic relationship with the petitioner while denying any illegal detention. However, the counsel alleged that the detainee had made the statement under duress and requested her physical presence in court.

Consequently, the counsel sought a legal determination on whether the High Court should have facilitated the alleged detainee's opportunity to provide their statement in person within the secure confines of the High Court building.

===== Fundamental Rights =====
The counsel contests interim orders, asserting that they have infringed upon the fundamental rights of both the petitioner and the detainee, specifically their safety and liberty. The counsel emphasized interim orders have prolonged the deprivation of safety and liberty for the detainee, spanning from 9 January 2023, to the present day. The counsel argued that the interim orders are in conflict with a binding precedent set by the Supreme Court in the case of Navtej Singh Johar v. Union of India (2018), which established that sexual orientation is an intrinsic aspect of constitutional rights, including liberty, dignity, privacy, personal autonomy, and equality.

==== Proceedings ====
On 6 February 2023, a three-judge Bench of the Supreme Court, comprising Chief Justice of India D.Y. Chandrachud, Justice P.S. Narasimha and Justice J.B. Pardiwala, heard the petitioner's argument and issued notice to the respondents, including the State Government of Kerala. The Bench directed the parents of the alleged detainee to bring her before the Family Court in Kollam on 8 February 2023. Additionally, the Principal Judge of the Family Court was instructed to arrange an interview between the alleged detainee and Ms. Saleena V G Nair, a senior judicial officer from Kerala and a Member of the E-Committee of the Supreme Court. Ms. Saleena V G Nair was responsible for preparing a confidential report to determine the preferences of the alleged detainee and whether she resided with her parents voluntarily or was unlawfully detained after interacting with the detainee. Crucially, both the Principal Judge of the Family Court and Ms. Saleena V G Nair were responsible for ensuring that the detainee's statement was recorded without any coercion or duress from her parents, prioritizing a fair and unbiased process.

==== Interim Order ====
In consideration of the Kerala High Court's interim order from 13 January 2023, which directed the District Legal Services Authority to determine the legality of the alleged detainee's detention at the residence of the alleged detainers, as well as the petitioner's argument that the alleged detainee's statement recorded under the supervision of the alleged detainers would not effectively establish the legality of the detention, the Bench, on 6 February 2023, stayed the Kerala High Court Interim order from 13 January 2023 until the next day of the hearing of the special leave petition.

Additionally, in consideration of the Kerala High Court's interim order from 2 January 2023, which directed the alleged detainee in a same-sex relationship to attend counseling sessions over the next four or five days, as well as the petitioner's argument that directing the alleged detainee to attend counseling sessions is fundamentally erroneous, the Bench, on 6 February 2023, stayed the Kerala High Court Interim order from 2 January 2023 until the next day of the hearing of the special leave petition.

Finally, the Bench stayed further proceedings in the case before Kerala High Court until the next day of until the next day of the hearing of the special leave petition.

== See also ==
- LGBT rights in India
- Adhila Nasarin v. State Commissioner of Police (2022)
- S Sushma v. Commissioner of Police (2021)
- Ujjawal v. State of Haryana (2021)
- Queerala v. State of Kerala (2020)
