= Ujjawal v. State of Haryana =

Indian LGBT Rights Case

- Court: Punjab and Haryana High Court
- Full case name: Ujjawal & Anr. versus State of Haryana & Ors.
- Decided: 12 May 2021
- Citation: CRWP. No. 4268 of 2021

Court membership
- Judge sitting: Anil Kshetarpal J.

Case opinions
- Refused to provide police protection to a couple facing threat to their lives and personal liberty, citing potential disruption to "social fabric of the society."
- Decision by: Anil Kshetarpal J.

Keywords
- Cohabitation Rights, Same-sex Relationship

Ujjawal & Anr. versus State of Haryana & Ors. (2021), a case where Punjab and Haryana High Court, refused to provide police protection to a couple facing a threat to their lives and personal liberty, citing potential disruption to "social fabric of the society."

== Background ==
Ujjawal, 18 years old, and his 21-year-old partner have stated that they are engaged in a mutually consensual relationship and are currently residing together. Due to concerns over potential harm to their lives and personal liberty from Ujjawal's family members, the couple approached the Punjab and Haryana High Court to request protective measures.

== Opinion of the Court ==
The Bench observed that Ujjawal is "barely" 18 years old. The Bench opined that if the couple's plea for safeguarding their life and personal liberty from Ujjawal's family is approved, the entire social fabric of the society would be disturbed. As a result, the Bench found no valid grounds to approve the requested protection.

The verdict of the Bench noticeably lacks legal precedents, thorough analysis, and comprehensive reasoning to substantiate its conclusions.

== Legal Analysis ==
The judgement contradicts the precedents set by the apex court, Supreme Court of India. The Supreme Court has affirmed that the right to choose a partner is protected under Article 21 of the Indian Constitution, and the constitutional rights cannot be denied on the social moral grounds.

=== Right to choose a partner ===
The judgement contradicts the past judgements of the Supreme Court. The Supreme Court has affirmed the right to choose a partner is part of the personal liberty protected under Article 21 of the Indian Constitution.

In Shafin Jahan versus Asokan K.M. (2018), a two-judge of the Supreme Court, consisting of Chief Justice of India Dipak Misra and Justice A.M. Khanwilkar, established that the right to choose one's spouse is inherent to Article 21 of the Constitution. While recognizing the significance of social values and morals, the court emphasized that these must not take precedence over constitutionally protected freedoms, which constitute both a fundamental human right and a constitutional right.

The right to marry a person of one’s choice is integral to Article 21 of the Constitution. The Constitution guarantees the right to life. This right cannot be taken away except through a law which is substantively and procedurally fair, just and reasonable. Intrinsic to the liberty which the Constitution guarantees as a fundamental right is the ability of each individual to take decisions on matters central to the pursuit of happiness.

— CJI Dipak Misra, Shafin Jahan v. Asokan K.M., para 21, pp 57

In Shakti Vahini v. Union of India (2018), a three-judge bench of the Supreme Court, consisting of Chief Justice of India Dipak Misra, Justice A.M. Khanwilkar and Justice D.Y. Chandrachud extended legal protection not only to married couples but also to unmarried couples, safeguarding them from potential threats of violence. The bench concluded that ensuring the safety of couples facing such threats is of paramount importance.

=== Constitutional morality ===
In the case of S.Khushboo v. Kanniammal (2010), a three-judge bench of the Supreme Court, consisting of Chief Justice of India K.G. Balakrishnan, Justice Deepak Verma and Justice B.S. Chauhan, ruled against excessive interference in personal autonomy and freedom of expression, cautioning against using the pretext of upholding social morality, given the subjective nature of these moral concepts.

Notions of social morality are inherently subjective and the criminal law cannot be used as a means to unduly interfere with the domain of personal autonomy

— J B.S. Chauhan, S.Khushboo v. Kanniammal, para 29, pp 32

In the case of Navtej Singh Johar v. Union of India (2018), which led to the decriminalization of homosexuality, a five-judge constitutional bench of the Supreme Court, emphasized the supremacy of 'constitutional morality' over 'social morality'. Justice D.Y. Chandrachud, in his concurring opinion, delved into Constitutional morality and the role of Constitutional Courts in safeguarding it. Constitutional morality dictates that citizens should be well-versed in and supportive of the core values of the Constitution, such as liberty, equality, and fraternity, as these foundational principles underlie the overarching objectives of the Constitution. It's crucial to recognize that the integration of constitutional morality is an ongoing process within society, and to facilitate this progression, constitutional courts are entrusted with the task of acting as external enablers. The duty of these courts encompasses overseeing the preservation of constitutional morality, a pivotal role in creating an environment conducive to the advancement of human dignity and liberty.

In a constitutional democracy like ours where the rule of law prevails, [rule of law] must not be allowed to be trampled by obscure notions of social morality which have no legal tenability.

— CJI Dipak Misra, Navtej Singh Johar v. Union of India, para 120, pp 79

However, the current case contradicted this established legal precedent, as Justice Anil Kshetarpal emphasized the significance of 'social morality' in his verdict.

== Related Cases ==
=== High Court Cases ===
This section delves into relevant cases from the High Courts of India. It's important to note that judgments rendered by one High Court do not hold mandatory authority over another, but they can still be regarded as influential precedents.

==== Sultana Mirza v. State of Uttar Pradesh ====
In the related case of Sultana Mirza v. State of Uttar Pradesh (2020), a same-sex couple residing together, approached the Allahabad High Court seeking protection against threat to their life and liberty by family members and the immediate society. In contrast to the Ujjawal v. State of Haryana, the verdict in Sultana Mirza v. State of Uttar Pradesh highlighted the precedence of 'constitutional morality', and upheld Constitutional rights.

A two-judge Bench of the Allahabad High Court invoked the Supreme Court precedent set by Navtej Singh Johar v. Union of India (2018), establishing that sexual orientation imposes both negative and positive obligations on the state, requiring not only non-discrimination but also the acknowledgment of rights that lead to genuine fulfillment in same-sex relationships. The Bench emphasized that as a constitutional court, it is obligated to uphold Constitutional morality and protect the rights of citizens, which are jeopardized solely due to their sexual orientation, and the Bench instructed the relevant law enforcement personnel to offer essential protection and prevent any form of harassment.

This Court being a constitutional Court is duty-bound to monitor and observe the Constitutional morality as well as the rights of the citizens which are under threat only on account of the sexual orientation.

— Shashi Kant Gupta J. and Pankaj Bhatia J., Sultana Mirza v. State of Uttar Pradesh, pp. 4

The Supreme Court of India recognized Sultana Mirza v. State of Uttar Pradesh (2020) as a significant ruling by a High Court in its "Sensitisation Module for the Judiciary on LGBTIQA+ Community," which addresses the challenges that marginalized queer individuals face within the justice system due to systemic marginalization.

==== Sreeja S v. Commissioner of Police ====
In the related case of Sreeja S v. Commissioner of Police (2018), Sreeja submitted a petition to the Kerala High Court seeking a writ of Habeas Corpus to compel the presentation of her same-sex romantic partner, Aruna, and ensure Aruna's liberty. In contrast to the Ujjawal v. State of Haryana, the verdict in Sreeja S v. Commissioner of Police refrained from assessing the suitability of the partner and instead upheld Constitutional rights.

A two-judge bench of the Kerala High Court observed that the court should abstain from evaluating the suitability of the partner, asserting that not taking action could potentially jeopardize Constitutional rights; consequently, the court issued a writ of Habeas Corpus, granting Aruna the freedom to be with Sreeja. The Bench referenced Supreme Court precedents such as Soni Gerry v. Gerry Douglas (2018), which established that the court cannot curtail the personal freedom of an adult under the doctrine of parens patriae; Nandakumar v. State of Kerala (2018), which ruled that adults lacking legal capacity for marriage can cohabit without formal wedlock; and Shafin Jahan V. Asokan (2018), which underscored the court's role in habeas corpus petitions as ensuring the detainee's independent choice while refraining from assessing partner suitability. Additionally, the Bench relied on Navtej Singh Johar v. Union of India (2018), which established that the Discrimination based on sexual orientation infringes on fundamental rights and asserted that constitutional morality should not be compromised for social morality. Furthermore, the Bench highlighted that the Indian Parliament recognizes 'live-in relationships' under the Protection of Women from Domestic Violence Act of 2005.

The Supreme Court of India recognized Sreeja S v. Commissioner of Police (2018) as a significant ruling by a High Court in its "Sensitisation Module for the Judiciary on LGBTIQA+ Community," which addresses the challenges that marginalized queer individuals face within the justice system due to systemic marginalization. The publication highlighted the observations of the High Court on aspects such as women's consent and adulthood, alongside the acknowledgment of 'live-in relationships' among same-sex couples, signifies progress in the acknowledgment of the rights of marginalized queer individuals.

== See also ==
- LGBT rights in India
- Devu G v. State Of Kerala (2023)
- S Sushma v. Commissioner of Police (2021)
- Navtej Singh Johar v. Union of India (2018)
