= Recognition of same-sex unions in Uttar Pradesh =

Uttar Pradesh does not recognise same-sex marriages or civil unions. However, live-in relationships are not unlawful in Uttar Pradesh. The Indian Supreme Court has held that adults have a constitutional right to live together without being married, and that police cannot interfere with consenting adults living together. The Allahabad High Court has upheld this constitutional right in multiple writ petitions, notably Sultana Mirza v. State of Uttar Pradesh in 2020 and Poonam Rani v. State of Uttar Pradesh in 2021. However, in 2022 the High Court dismissed a case seeking to legalise same-sex marriage.

== Legal history ==
=== Background ===
Marriage in India is governed under several federal laws. These laws allow for the solemnisation of marriages according to different religions, notably Hinduism, Jainism, Buddhism, Christianity, Islam, Sikhism and Zoroastrianism. Every citizen has the right to choose which law will apply to them based on their community or religion. These laws are the Hindu Marriage Act, 1955, the Indian Christian Marriage Act, 1872, the Muslim Personal Law (Shariat) Application Act, 1937, the Anand Marriage Act, 1909 and the Parsi Marriage and Divorce Act, 1936. The Special Marriage Act, 1954 (SMA; Hindi: विशेष विवाह अधिनियम, १९५४, Viśeṣ Vivāh Adhiniyam; Urdu: خصوصی شادی قانون، ۱۹۵۴ء, Xusūsī Śādī Qānūn) allows civil marriage officers to solemnize and register marriages for all Indian citizens regardless of the religion of either party. Although the vast majority of marriages in India continue to be solemnized and registered under the traditional religious personal laws, the SMA has become popular among interfaith couples, inter-caste couples, and spouses with no religious beliefs. None of these acts explicitly bans same-sex marriage.

On 14 February 2006, the Supreme Court of India ruled in Smt. Seema v. Ashwani Kumar that the states and union territories are obliged to register all marriages performed under the federal laws. The court's ruling was expected to reduce instances of child marriages, bigamy, domestic violence and unlawful abandonment. In 2017, the state government published the Uttar Pradesh Marriage Registration Rules, 2017. The measure provides for the registration of all marriages performed in Uttar Pradesh and created local registrars that issue marriage licenses to prospective spouses. Registrars may refuse to issue licenses if the parties fail to meet the requirements to marry under the federal marriage laws. The measure does not explicitly prohibit same-sex marriages. Previously, Hindu marriages were registered under the Uttar Pradesh Hindu Marriage Registration Rules, 1973, but the enactment of a uniform compulsory marriage registration law stalled due to opposition from the Muslim community. Prior to 2017, Uttar Pradesh had been one of only two states not to have enacted compulsory marriage regulations, along with Nagaland.

Traditional Indian marriages (विवाह, vivāh) are deeply rooted in custom and hold significant cultural importance. They involve elaborate pre-wedding preparations and culminate in key rituals, including the tying of the mangala sutra and the saptapadi. Arranged marriage remains the prevailing norm across India, accounting for the vast majority of unions, and often placing pressure on LGBT individuals to marry partners of the opposite sex. Nevertheless, some same-sex couples have participated in traditional marriage ceremonies, although these unions lack legal recognition in Uttar Pradesh. In 2004, two young Muslim men were married in Ghaziabad, but were physically assaulted by family members when it was reported that they intended to continue living together. In 2018, a lesbian couple, classmates at a local college, were married at a mass wedding event in Agra after one of them dressed as male. After being tipped off by another student of the college, the couple's family members urged them to separate. Both women, who insisted on living together, were taken to a local police station, which later chose not to take any action against the couple. In December 2018, two women applied to marry at the local registrar's office in Hamirpur, but officials refused to register the union citing lack of relevant legal provisions. Additionally, in June 2019 two women in Muzaffarnagar asked for police protection from their families in order to be allowed to marry.

=== Live-in relationships ===
Recognition of same-sex unions in India

Live-in relationships (Hindi: सहवास संबंध, sahvās sambandh, pronounced [ˈsəɦʋaːs ˈsəmbə̃ndʱ], or लिव-इन रिलेशनशिप, liv-in rileśanśip; Urdu: اکٹھے رہنے کا تعلق, akathē rahnē kā ta'alluq) are not illegal in Uttar Pradesh. The Indian Supreme Court has held that adults have a constitutional right to live together without being married, that police cannot interfere with consenting adults living together, and that live-in relationships are not unlawful. State courts have upheld this constitutional right, and further ruled that if a couple faces threats from family or the community they may request police protection. However, live-in relationships do not confer all the legal rights and benefits of marriage.

The Allahabad High Court has issued two judgments regarding same-sex live-in relationships. Citing the Supreme Court's ruling in Navtej Singh Johar v. Union of India, which decriminalized homosexuality in India in 2018, the High Court held in November 2020 that sexual orientation constitutes an inherent aspect of the constitutional rights to liberty, dignity, privacy, personal autonomy and equality. Further, it affirmed that the courts must protect same-sex couples from discrimination, emphasizing constitutional morality over popular norms, and ordered police protection for couples facing family interference and harassment. The High Court reiterated this precedent in January 2021 in Poonam Rani v. State of Uttar Pradesh, recognizing the right of same-sex couples to live together as an inherent part of liberty and dignity guaranteed by Article 21 of the Constitution. Both writ petitions were filed by same-sex partners who sought protection against threats to their lives by family members and the community. Additionally, the verdict in Poonam Rani explicitly highlighted the legal right of live-in same-sex couples to equal protection under the law.

=== 2022 writ petition ===
In April 2022, the Allahabad High Court dismissed a case brought by a Hindu lesbian couple in Prayagraj who wished to marry under the Hindu Marriage Act. The court also dismissed a habeas corpus petition brought by the mother of one of the spouses, who claimed that her daughter had been kidnapped. The state government intervened politically in the case to signal its opposition to same-sex marriages, "As per the Indian law and culture, a biological husband and wife have are essential for marriage, and only their marriage has been recognised. In their absence, homosexual marriage cannot be recognised as it lacks male and female and neither can they produce children. Marriage is considered important in Hindu law, under which both men and women live together and carry forward the human chain by producing children."

=== Transgender and intersex issues ===
Like most of South Asia, Uttar Pradesh recognizes a traditional third gender community known as hijra (हिजड़ा, ہِجڑا, hijṛā), historically holding respected community roles, and known for their distinct culture, communities led by gurus, and traditional roles as performers. The Supreme Court's 2023 ruling in Supriyo v. Union of India held that the Indian Constitution does not require the legalisation of same-sex marriages but affirmed that transgender people may marry opposite-sex partners. In December 2014, media outlets reported the story of a woman who "changed her gender" in order to marry her partner in Kannauj. It is unclear if the woman was transgender, but media reported that she underwent a gender change operation to avoid her "family's fear of social disgrace over a same-sex marriage".

In 2021, a man in Kanpur filed a lawsuit against his in-laws accusing them of misleading him into marrying a transgender woman.

== Public opinion ==
According to a 2019 report titled "Politics and Society Between Elections 2019", published by the Azim Premji Foundation and the Centre for the Study of Developing Societies, Uttar Pradesh ranked among the most supportive states and union territories regarding same-sex unions, followed by Delhi and Tamil Nadu.

== See also ==
- LGBT rights in India
- Recognition of same-sex unions in India
- Supriyo v. Union of India
