= Queerala v. State of Kerala =

Indian LGBT Rights Case Law

- Court: Kerala High Court
- Full case name: Queerala Anr. versus State of Kerala & Ors.
- Decided: TBA
- Citation: WP(C) No. 21202 of 2020: 10 December 2021

Court membership
- Judge sitting: P. V. Kunhikrishnan J.

Case opinions
- The State must undertake rigorous measures against involuntary conversion therapy.; The State should develop comprehensive guidelines pertaining to conversion therapy by formulating them through the study of an expert committee that includes insights from queer community-based organizations and other relevant stakeholders.
- Decision by: P. V. Kunhikrishnan J.

Keywords
- Conversion Therapy

Queerala & Anr. versus State of Kerala & Ors. (2020) is an ongoing case of the Kerala High Court, where the Bench has directed the State Government of Kerala to implement stringent measures against involuntary conversion therapy and formulate guidelines pertaining to conversion therapy based on an expert committee's study that incorporates insights from queer community-based organizations and relevant stakeholders.

The Supreme Court of India acknowledged this case in its publication titled "Sensitisation Module for the Judiciary on LGBTIQA+ Community" as one of the High Court judgments that effectively addressed the difficulties and obstacles experienced by queer individuals within the justice system due to their systemic marginalization.

== Background ==
The petitioners include Queerala, a registered community-based organisation representing the Malayali queer community and Raghav PR, a transgender man who claims to have been subjected to involuntary conversion therapy. The petition was prompted by the rise in reported conversion therapies during the COVID-19 lock down since March, a period that witnessed queer individuals being confined to their homes with unsupportive parents who subsequently took them to health practitioners.

Queerala highlighted that numerous complaints emerged during the COVID-19 lock down. For instance, a young woman's parents compelled her to visit a doctor who suggested hospitalization to examine if her internal organs 'are working' and prescribed medication. Another case involved a bisexual woman who shared her experience of a psychiatrist prescribing schizophrenia medication. When she pointed out that the Indian Psychiatric Society (Kerala) considers conversion therapy unjustifiable and illegal, the psychiatrist criticized her, asserting that his perspective was grounded in 'science' while labeling her viewpoint as an 'opinion.' Another distressing incident involved a woman who experienced a breakdown following 'counselling' by a mental health practitioner. Upon realizing her lesbian identity, she sought assistance from a counsellor who prescribed medication, exacerbating her depression.

Queerala reached out to Indian Psychiatric Society for assistance, but doctors who claim to 'cure' queer individuals deny such practices when confronted. The necessity for legal intervention becomes apparent in order to effectively address these recurring situations. Hence, the petitioners have approached the court seeking a definitive resolution.

== Proceedings ==
The petition presented to the Kerala High Court seeks the following relief concerning conversion therapy, which targets altering the sexual orientation, gender identity, and gender expression of queer individuals.

- A declaration that any form of conversion therapy without consent is illegal, unconstitutional, and infringes on the Fundamental Rights conferred by Articles 14, 19, and 21 of the Constitution.
- A directive to the State Government of Kerala to prohibit the practice of conversion therapy without consent by healthcare facilities and health practitioners within the state.
- A directive to the State Government of Kerala to establish a mental health guideline, rendering any form of conversion therapy illegal for healthcare facilities and health practitioners within the state.

The counsel for the State Government of Kerala acknowledged the absence of guidelines categorizing conversion therapy as illegal for healthcare institutions and practitioners within the state. However, the counsel emphasized that no complaints had been received concerning the alleged involuntary conversion cited in the writ petition. In the event of such involuntary conversion, the Government's counsel affirmed the Government's view that such actions are unlawful and pledged to take necessary measures.

== Opinion of the Court ==
=== Legal Framework ===
The Bench relied on the affidavit submitted by the State Government of Kerala, which addressed pertinent sections of the Mental Healthcare Act of 2017. According to the submissions, Section 3 of the Mental Healthcare Act of 2017 dictates that the determination of mental illness relies on globally recognized medical criteria, including the latest edition of the World Health Organization's International Classification of Diseases. Since homosexuality isn't classified as a disorder according to these standards, any effort to treat or cure it is regarded as unlawful.

The submissions also highlighted that Section 89 of the Mental Healthcare Act permits involuntary admission to a mental health facility for individuals with severe mental illness, but only when they display behaviors like self-harm, violence towards others, or an inability to care for themselves. This provision effectively excludes involuntary admission for 'conversion therapy.'

Furthermore, the submissions observed that while Section 95 of the Mental Healthcare Act outlines prohibitions against specific procedures, 'conversion therapy,' despite lacking scientific basis, is not explicitly mentioned among the prohibited practices. Although State Medical Councils have the authority to restrict unscientific treatments, many counselors and psychologists operate without regulation from these bodies. This underscores the necessity for a broader effort to prevent the practice of 'conversion therapy' in the state of Kerala.

=== Expert Opinion ===
The Bench also relied on the study report submitted by the Indian Psychiatric Society (Kerala). The submissions noted that the application of conversion therapy, aimed at altering the sexual orientation, gender identity, or gender expression of queer individuals, can only be interpreted as unauthorized and forceful attempts. It emphasized that conversion therapies lack scientific evidence, approved treatment protocols, and often result in significant psychological distress and trauma, reinforcing harmful internalized attitudes irreversibly.

The submissions acknowledged that queer individuals, who already face vulnerabilities due to stigma, bullying, family, and societal pressures, might seek assistance from mental health professionals. These professionals can help address associated problems through pharmacological and non-pharmacological therapies. The submission observed that queer individuals or their families may grapple with questions related to gender identity or sexual orientation, prompting them to approach mental health professionals for guidance on issues like suicidal ideation or relationship conflicts. These issues can be resolved through clinical diagnosis and treatment plans that acknowledge and accept the individual's gender identity or sexual orientation.

Finally, the submission recommended government policies, guidelines, written protocols, and formalized treatment plans to empower qualified professionals to provide clinical intervention while maintaining professional judgment. This approach aims to prevent misuse by those with vested interests attempting to curtail individual rights.

=== Directives ===
The Bench concluded that the creation of a guideline concerning conversion therapy is imperative. Accordingly, the Bench issued a directive to the State Government of Kerala to thoroughly investigate this matter. If found necessary, the State Government is mandated to establish an expert committee tasked with examining this issue. Subsequent to the assessment, the State Government should develop a guideline based on the conclusions of the study and present it to the Court within a span of 5 months. The Bench further instructed the State Government to engage with a representative from Queerala and other stakeholders before finalizing the guidelines.

Additionally, the bench noted that if the petitioners' allegations of involuntary conversion therapy hold true, it becomes essential to take stringent actions, and accordingly instructed the State Government of Kerala to conduct a thorough investigation.

== Impact ==
The Supreme Court of India recognized this case in its publication "Sensitisation Module for the Judiciary on LGBTIQA+ Community" as a notable High Court judgment addressing the justice system's challenges faced by marginalized queer individuals, wherein the High Court, upon learning about involuntary conversions therapy by medical practitioners, instructed the State Government to investigate the matter and establish an expert committee for further study if needed, with the committee's findings guiding the State to draft guidelines within five months for submission to the Court.

== See also ==
- LGBT rights in India
- Adhila Nasarin v. State Commissioner of Police (2022)
- S Sushma v. Commissioner of Police (2021)
