= The Wax Prince =

Indian folk tale

The Wax Prince is an Indian folktale collected and published by Indian author Shovona Devi. In it, a queen devises a ruse to trick the king she gave birth to the son he desired, and she goes great lengths to keep the deceit until the marriage, when the false prince is to be presented to his potential bride; a snake couple learns of the situation and the male snake decides to assume the form and place of the human prince and marry the human princess; later, the princess asks her husband's origins and he vanishes, but at the end of the tale the prince returns and assumes human form permanently.

The first part of the tale deals with a tale type that is present in North India, ATU 459, "The Make-Believe Son (Daughter)", wherein a queen tricks the king by fashioning an image of a human child to keep up appearances that she gave birth to an heir, but eventually her creation gains human life. The second part of the tale is a local form of the international cycle of the Animal as Bridegroom or The Search for the Lost Husband, in that a woman marries a man of supernatural origin (a snake or serpent), loses him and must regain him.

== Summary ==
In this tale, a king worries for not having children to carry on his family name, and confides in his wife, the queen, about it. The queen worries that the monarch will find a second wife that will bear him an heir and become the favourite in his eyes, so she devises a plan: she convinces the king she will bring him a child, but lies that the baby cannot be seen until a certain age, for it was predicted thus in a dream. Thus, the king gives her much gold, and she moves out of the palace into a distant house. With the gold, the queen bribes a mother-wit to bring a real child she pinches and rocks to sleep to keep up appearances of having born a prince. After some years, the king sends a tutor to teach the young prince, whom the queen also bribes. The tutor feels caught in a dilemma: he can trick the king until he farce is discovered, or he can tell the king and incur the queen's wrath, so he plans to enjoy the gifts until he departs from the kingdom when the moment is right. He supplies the king with a child's calligraphy, and maintains the farce.

In time, the king decides to marry his imaginary son to a bride, and the queen despairs that her plot may be discovered. The mother-wit, however, helps her again: she fashions a likelike humanoid doll to pass off as the prince. The queen also hides the wax doll inside a veiled palanquin to maintain her deception and says they will take the prince to the bride's house. On the road, the retinue stop by a river, where a snake slithers inside the palanquin and gives life to the doll. When the royal palanquin arrives at the bride's house, a living human prince steps outside the palanquin, and the king seized with joy for his "son", goes to embrace and kiss him, despite the queen's warnings. The wedding retinue returns home and the queen faints, thinking the king has discovered the ruse. However, the human prince goes to meet his mother accompanied by his bride and the queen is relieved and glad that the prince is real, thinking that the doll was given life by a magician.

Some time later, the prince's wife asks her mother-in-law about the prince's family, but the queen goads the newly wed princess to ask her husband herself, since the queen also wants to know how the doll came alive. Thus, while walking near the bank of the river where the palanquin stopped before the wedding, the princess asks the prince about his race, but the prince begs her not to press further. Still, the princess keeps questioning him about his origins, as he enters the water and continues to sink, asking the princess if she indeed wants to know of his true origins. The princess admits she is curious; the prince turns into a large snake and dives in the water.

The princess swoons, but is rescued by a local old woman and lives with her, afraid of returning to her parents-in-law's palace. As for the king, he notices his "son"'s long absence and surmises something must have happened to him, to which the queen, relieved, reminds him of her warning. Back to the princess, she is visited by a large snake that coils around her feet and becomes friends with her. The strange happenings reach the ears of the king, who rushes to the old woman's hut near the river, but hides in a tree trunk. One day, the large snake enters the old woman's house, but does not see the princess, since she is being tended to by the old woman due to an illness. The snake begins to circle around in a frantic manner, until it removes its slough and turns back into the human Wax Prince (which the story explains is his name). The king, his father, watches the event, burns the snake's slough, and embraces him son. On the mention of the prince's name, the princess's health immediately improves, and the whole family returns home with the old woman in tow.

== Analysis ==
=== Tale type ===
==== ATU 459: The Make-Believe Son (Daughter) ====
The first part of the tale is classified in the international Aarne-Thompson-Uther Index as tale type ATU 459, "The Make-Believe Son (Daughter)": a queen fashions a false image of a child (son or daughter) or a servant finds an animal to convince her husband, the childless king, that she gave birth, and continues the ruse until it is time to marry the royal child; the queen worries that the king will discover the deceit and thinks of killing herself, but deities take pity on the queen and transform the image or animal into a human person.

==== Thompson-Roberts 425D Ind ====
The second part of the tale is classified, in Stith Thompson and Warren Roberts's Types of Indic Oral Tales, as its own Indic type, 425D Ind, "Search for Serpent Husband": the heroine marries a man of mysterious origin; jealous women probe her into asking his name or origins; he reveals it and turns into a snake; after many hardships, she reunites with him. (Note: The word "Indic" refers to tale types that, although not registered in the Aarne-Thompson-Uther international index, exist in the oral and written literature of these three South Asian countries.)

=== Motifs ===
According to Stith Thompson and Jonas Balys study of motifs of Indian literature and oral folklore, the tale contains the motifs B604.1 "Marriage to snake", D391 "Transformation: serpent (snake) to person", and D435.1.4. "Wax prince animated by serpent becomes human being".

==== The husband's vanishing ====
In his work about Cupid and Psyche and other Animal as Bridegroom tales, Swedish scholar Jan-Öjvind Swahn identified that, in certain tales, the heroine causes her supernatural husband's disappearance by inquiring his name. Swahn named this motif The Name Taboo and surmised that it occurred "primarily in India". In Thompson and Roberts's Types of Indic Oral Tales, this motif appears in Indic type 425D Ind, "Search for Serpent Husband": the heroine insists to know her husband's caste or name, and he, in return, gives her an answer, but vanishes in the water like a snake. This episode corresponds with motifs C32.2., "Tabu: questioning supernatural husband"; C32.2.1, "Tabu: asking name of supernatural husband"; C32.2.2, "Tabu: asking where supernatural husband comes from", and C32.2.3, "Tabu: asking for caste of supernatural husband."

== Variants ==
According to scholarship, tale type ATU 459 is "widespread throughout North India and other Asian areas, but never found in Europe".

=== The Tale of Thakur and the Barber ===
In an Indian tale titled The Tale of Thakur and the Barber, collected from informant Menhdi Lal, from Bibipur, Bara-Banki District, a Thakur takes his Barber, named Gokul Nai, to a pilgrimage next to the Ganges. Tired of attending to the Thakur, the barber tells the Thakur he will leave him if he asks the man something he cannot answer. They reach a city and the barber goes to buy some provisions, when he sees a man cradling a dead snake and crying "Hae! meri nagin" ("Alas, my female snake"). The barber returns to the Thakur and reports the finding, hoping the Thakur does not have an explanation for the event. Thus, the Thakur recounts a tale: a Rája complained that his Ráni had only given him daughters, and threatened to kill her if their next child was a girl. As he predicted, the queen gave birth to a girl, but the queen devised a ruse: she told the king that the prince was born under the asterism of Mul and could not be seen for twelve years. Twelve years passed, and the king arranged for his son's marriage. As the royal palanquin led the would-be bridegroom and the queen, she worried for her fate and her daughter's; the Kahars put down the palanquin next to a tank, and the Rája of the snakes, who lived in the tank, appeared to the princess inside the palanquin and asked her the reason for her sadness. After learning of the queen's ruse, the Snake Rája convened with his snake subjects in the tank how to help the princess; despite their reservations about helping humans, who killed their numbers, the Snake Rája assumed human form and replaced the princess inside the palanquin. When the palanquin reached the bride's palace, the queen worried about her ruse being discovered, but a man came out of the palanquin, to her relief. The Snake Rája married a human princess, and they lived together. After some time, the Snake Rája's snake wife missed her husband and went in search for him, finding him married to a human girl, so she assumed a human disguise and convinced the human princess to ask the Snake Rája about his caste. The human princess kept asking the Snake Rája about his origin, but he refused to divulge anything and asked her to stop asking, but, after much insistence, he took the princess to the tank, resumed his snake form and dived in. The human princess mourned for the loss of her husband, and settled there in a small hut. A Mali woman (gardener or florist) who delivered flowers to Snake Rája learnt of the princess's plight and told Snake Rája about it. The Snake Rája decided to return to his human wife and left his snake-wife behind. The snake-wife followed him into the small hut and prepared to bite the human princess to death, but the Snake Rája placed some poisoned gum on the couch leg. The snake-wife touched the gum and became stuck, dying after. The Snake Rája lamented the death of his snake-wife. The Thakur ends his tale, and both go to another town. The barber goes to buy some provisions and finds a moving goat's head on a door alternatively weeping and laughing. The barber asks the Thakur about it, and the Thakur retells a tale about how King Vikramaditya, who had powers to transfer his soul outside his body, did this to a parrot's body and the king's servant transferred his own soul to Vikramaditya's body; Vikramaditya's wife then played a trick on the false king and asked him to transfer his soul to a goat, which she beheaded, while the true king retook his body.

=== The Snake Prince (Kumaon) ===
In an Indian tale collected in Kumaon with the title The Snake Prince, a king and queen rule a prosperous kingdom, but have no heirs. One day, a Brahmin appears and divines that the king shall have a son, but the Brahmin does not have actual astrological knowledge. Still, he hires a servant girl to help him in his ruse, and they help the queen with the fake pregnancy by tying the queen's belly in a sari and pretend she is pregnant. The Brahmin also advises the king not to bother the queen for the remainder of the pregnancy, lest an ill omen befalls her and the prince. For her part in the ruse, the queen asks the maid why she is not feeling the pains of pregnancy, but the maid assures her it is a divinely ordained pregnancy, and told her to keep silent about it. After nine months, the time of labour is nigh, but the queen does not bear any child, and the maid points out that the king will behead the three of them, while the Brahmin lies to the king that he cannot see the prince for another twelve years, for the boy's safety. After twelve years pass, the king demands to see his scion, but the Brahmin advises him to find a bride for the prince, for his face will be seen at the wedding. After some selection, the king chooses a bride, but the bride's family wishes to see the bridegroom. The Brahmin assuages he does not have imperfections, and he will be seen at the wedding. Thus, the wedding procession is prepared, and the Brahmin places a statue of Ganesha inside the palanquin to act as the prince. After walking a while, the bearers let the palanquin under a mango tree and stop to rest, while the Brahmin prentends that the "prince" declines any tea. A pair of snakes live in the tree and see the exchange with curiosity; the snake wife, who has omniscient powers, discerns the whole story and asks her husband to shapeshift into a human male and enter the palanquin, in order to preserve the Brahmin's life and the king's reputation. The snake enters the palanquin and becomes the groom, to the Brahmin's surprise. The retinue reaches the bride's palace and out comes the prince, whom the king embraces for the first time. The palanquin makes a return and pass by the same mango tree as before, and the snake resumes his serpentine form, but the snake-wife tells him to keep the disguise a bit longer when they return to proceed with the wedding celebrations, and he has but to call on her name and she will appear to him. The snake follows his wife's suggestions and continues to pass off as human for when they return to the king's palace. The queen and the maid worry for the discovery of the ruse, and the queen cries, which the maid lies that she has a headache. The prince comes out of the palanquin, to the queen's relief and happiness, and she blesses her "son"'s marriage to the bride. Months pass, and the snake-wife notices her husband is not coming back, and goes looking for him. She reaches the king and queen's palace and slithers to the third floor, where the prince is sleeping with his human wife. The snake-wife is caught between leaving them be or harming the prince and exposing them, and chooses the later, which she plans to do by morning. However, the maid alerts the king of the snake in the prince's room and the monarch kills it. The king feels sorry for harming the animal, thinking he did something that will damn the prince. The prince recognizes the corpse of the animal and performs the death rituals himself, then lives with his human family.

=== What Became of the She-Snake ===
In a tale from Haryana translated to Bengali with the title "একী হল? কেন হল?" ("Why did it happen") and to English as What Became of the She-Snake, Gurudev is teaching his lessons, when a woman approaches him and says she found a handsome youth on the road, wearing a dead snake's skin around his neck, crying and muttering "একী হল? কেন হল?" ("Why did it happen?"; "Say what became of the she-snake?" in Roy Chaudhury's translation). Gurudev offers to explain to the woman the story behind the handsome stranger: a king has seven wives, but no son, even after doing penance and performing rituals, so he decides to depart for pilgrimage. The seven queens suffer for the king's unhappiness, so they devise a ruse: they lie to the king that the youngest queen is pregnant. The king wishes to see his son, but the queens bribe the priests to tell the monarch he cannot see the prince for twelve years. The king agrees to the terms, but waits expectantly for the elapsed time, and receives news of the prince's development through his co-wives, who engaged tutors and servants to keep up the charade. After twelve years, the king wishes to see his son, but the priests say that the prince can only be seen after the wedding and during the phere. As time passes, would-be brides' fathers send gifts and marriage proposals. When the time of marriage is upon the prince, the queens hire a carpenter to fashion a wooden image of a person, which they place in a palanquin and send the imaginary bridegroom towards his wedding, accompanied by a retinue of musicians and drummers. After a while, the palanquin bearers stop to rest near a hollow or cave where a snake couple lives. The male snake tells his snake wife the king will die of a broken heart for the fake son he never had, and she sighs that the wooden prince could be real. The male snake then hatches a plan: he will transfer his soul from his snake body to the false prince for six months, after which he will return to his snake body. The female snake (Sapini) agrees to protect the snake body, and the male snake promises to return after the palanquin returns with the couple and pass by their hollow. It happens thus, and the snake becomes the human prince. The king sees the face of his son for the first time and embraces him. The snake, in human form, begins to forget his snake wife's words. The prince's wedding is celebrated, and the wedding procession passes by the snake hollow. The female snake spots the happy couple and follows them to their new palace. She enters the prince's room and sees the look of happiness on the sleeping prince's face, worrying that he forgot his snake wife. The snake-wife kills herself in the room, and the prince finds the body, then regains the memories of his previous snake life. He realizes he lost his snake wife, loses his mind and utters a cry asking why it happened. Since then, he wanders the country with the snake wife's body coiled around his neck.

=== Other tales ===
In a tale collected from a source named Sukhrani Devi in Sheoli, it begins with a childless king worrying about his lack of heirs, when a maidservant tells him the queen is pregnant and will give birth to a son. The maidservant keeps up the charade long enough until the false prince's marriage is arranged and she molds an image with sesame seeds to act as the prince, and the marriage retinue departs with him. The marriage retinue stops and pitch tents to rest for the night. Near the maidservant's tent, a male cobra is drawn to the music and enters the maidservant's tent. He bites the false image and realizes it is made of sesame, then comments with his cobra wife about it. The maidservant overhears their conversation and asks them for some help. The male cobra says he can assume the role of the prince and take on human form, which the cobra wife allows him to do, but on the proviso he must return to his cobra wife after the wedding, otherwise she will come to bite the princess. The male cobra agrees to her terms and takes on the form of a handsome prince. The maidservant calls for the king to see his son for the first time, and the party leaves to celebrate the marriage. The marriage between the now human prince is celebrated with the princess, and the party stops near the same place as before. The she-cobra appears to her husband to remind him of his promise, but he delays his return to snake form since they must return to the prince's palace and he cannot abandon the retinue in the middle of the journey. The she-cobra reluctantly agrees. The wedding party returns to the prince's kingdom and the prince enjoys the comforts of human life, forgetting about his previous life. After a long time, the she-cobra notices her husband is not returning and goes to the palace to bite the princess, then flees to her snake hole. The prince goes after his snake-wife in search of explanations, and the she-cobra admits she did this since the human princess stole her husband. The prince thinks his snake-wife is justified in her actions, but he cannot abandon the human princess. For this, the she-cobra hits her hood on a rock and kills herself. The human princess wakes up and the prince goes to live with her.

== See also ==
- Animal as Bridegroom
- Khirer Putul
- The Daughter of the Childless King
- Princess Himal and Nagaray
- Prince Lal Maluk
- The Snake Prince (Indian fairy tale)
- The Ruby Prince (Punjabi folktale)
- The Story of Hira and Lal
- The Story of Halahal Kumar
