= Love Lottery =

2026 Indian film

- release poster
- Directed by: Arvind Pandey
- Written by: Ankur Khattri
- Produced by: Kuldeep Bhargava "Tushar"
- Starring: Akshay Oberoi; Heli Daruwala; Kabir Duhan Singh; Vijayant Kohli; Hemant Pandey; Santosh Shukla
- Cinematography: Navin V. Mishra
- Edited by: Prakash Jha
- Music by: Varun Mishra; Arvind Pandey
- Production company: Cinema Ganj Films
- Distributed by: RedEye Studio
- Release date: 25 September 2026
- Running time: 141 minutes
- Country: India
- Language: Hindi

Love Lottery is a 2026 Indian Hindi-language courtroom thriller film directed by Arvind Pandey and produced by Kuldeep Bhargava under the banner of Cinema Ganj Films. The film stars Akshay Oberoi and Heli Daruwala, with Kabir Duhan Singh, Vijayant Kohli and Hemant Pandey in supporting roles. It was released theatrically on 25 September 2026.

== Plot ==
The film's story deals with questions surrounding marriage, legal disputes and the experiences of men involved in such cases, while the circumstances surrounding the death remain central to the courtroom proceedings.

== Cast ==
- Akshay Oberoi as Kartik Saxena
- Heli Daruwala as Bharani Verma
- Kabir Duhan Singh as Inspector Vikram Bisht
- Vijayant Kohli as Vijay
- Hemant Pandey as Head Constable Mahendra Pant
- Indira Krishnan as Sandhya Verma
- Santosh Shukla as Neeraj Singh Rana
- Vikramm Sharma as Advocate Prashant Batra
- Agni Agyari as Shabnam

== Production ==
Principal photography took place from 27 February to 31 March 2026 in Dehradun and Rishikesh in Uttarakhand.

== Release ==
The first look of the film was unveiled on 6 July 2026. The film was initially scheduled for a theatrical release on 18 September 2026, but was later pushed to 25 September 2026.

== Critical reception ==
The Times of India, News18 and Dainik Bhaskar each rated the film 3 out of 5 stars. India TV also gave it 3 out of 5, praising Oberoi's restrained performance but criticising the uneven pacing. Hindusthan Samachar noted the film's focus on marital disputes and men's rights and praised Oberoi's climactic monologue. Film Information was more critical, calling the story ordinary and the screenplay uneven.
