= Heli Daruwala =

Indian actress (born 1992)

- Daruwala in 2026
- Born: 14 July 1992 (age 34); Surat, Gujarat
- Education: Gemological Institute of America, Mumbai
- Occupations: Actress; model
- Years active: 2007–present
- Known for: Nisha Aur Uske Cousins; Naagin 3 Dastaan-E-Mohabbat Salim Anarkali

Heli Daruwala is an Indian actress and model who primarily works in Hindi television. She made her acting debut in 2007 with the film Dum Kaata. She made her TV debut in 2011 with Love U Zindagi where she played Neha. She then potrayed Kirti Gangwal in Nisha Aur Uske Cousins. She made her bollywood debut as lead actress in 2026 with film Love Lottery.

Daruwala is best known for her potrayal of Anu Mittal in Naagin 3 and Maan Bai in Dastaan-E-Mohabbat Salim Anarkali.

== Early life ==
Daruwala was born on 14 July 1992 in Surat, Gujarat. Her mother is a Kathak dancer. Heli pursued a Bachelor of Dental Surgery from the Gemological Institute of America, Mumbai. Daruwala is a dentist, and a trained Kathak dancer.

== Career ==
Daruwala made her acting debut in 2007 with the Hindi film Dum Kaata where she was seen as Imlee. She then made her television debut in 2011 with Love U Zindagi playing Neha. She next appeared in Humse Hai Liife as Saloni Singhal. From 2012 to 2013, she played Alisha Deewan in Suvreen Guggal – Topper of The Year.

She next played Preeti in an episode of MTV Webbed in 2014. Daruwala potrayed Kirti Gangwal in Nisha Aur Uske Cousins from 2014 to 2015. In 2015 she played Raima in an episode of Pyaar Tune Kya Kiya. She played Aafreen in Qubool Hai from 2015 to 2016.

Daruwala potrayed Anu Mittal in the 2018 show Naagin 3. From 2018 to 2019 she potrayed Maan Bai in Dastaan-E-Mohabbat Salim Anarkali. In 2019, she appeared as Heli in a Special appearances in Yeh Rishtey Hain Pyaar Ke.

From 2019 to 2020, she appeared as Nisha Agnihotri in Haiwaan. She next appeared as Tiya in Shaadi Mubarak in 2020. Daruwala has been part of many music videos as well.

In 2025 she appeared in Ek Chatur Naar. In 2026, she made her lead debut in suspense thriller movie Love Lottery.

== Personal life ==
As of 2018, Daruwala has been in a relationship with Businessman Ankit Anand.

== Filmography ==
=== Television ===
Year	Title	Role	Notes	Ref.
2011	Love U Zindagi	Neha		
2011–2012	Humse Hai Liife	Saloni Singhal		
2012–2013	Suvreen Guggal – Topper of The Year	Alisha Deewan		
2014	MTV Webbed	Preeti	Episodic role	
2014–2015	Nisha Aur Uske Cousins	Kirti Gangwal		
2015	Pyaar Tune Kya Kiya	Raima	Episodic role	
2015–2016	Qubool Hai	Aafreen		
2018	Naagin 3	Anu Mittal		
2018–2019	Dastaan-E-Mohabbat Salim Anarkali	Maan Bai		
2019	Yeh Rishtey Hain Pyaar Ke	Heli	Cameo appearance	
2019–2020	Haiwaan	Nisha Agnihotri		
2020	Shaadi Mubarak	Tiya	Cameo appearance	

=== Films ===
Year	Title	Role	Notes	Ref.
2007	Dum Kaata	Imlee	Child actor	
2025	Ek Chatur Naar	Tina		
2026	Love Lottery	Bharani	Lead Debut	

=== Web ===
Year	Title	Role	Notes	Ref.
2026	Dhindora (Season 2)	Ramya	cameo appearance in Episode 1	

== See also ==
- List of Hindi television actresses
