= Khirer Putul =

Bengali children's fantasy novel by Abanindranath Tagore

- Queen and monkey
- Author: Abanindranath Tagore
- Language: Bengali
- Subject: Children's Literature
- Published: 1896
- Publication place: India

Khirer Putul or Kshirer Putul (lit. 'Doll of Kheer') is a children's fantasy novel written by Abanindranath Tagore in 1896. Khirer Putul is considered a masterpiece and landmark by writers in Bengali language children's literature. Khirer Putul is a simple and touching tale about the sugar doll, the fate of Duorani and a tricky and extraordinary monkey. Aadi Brahmosamaj press first published this book. Later on, it was translated into other languages.

== Plot ==
The king of Deepnagar had two queens, Suo Rani and Duo Rani. The king gave Suo Rani 7 palaces, 700 female slaves, best ornaments from 7 kingdoms, 7 gardens, 7 chariots. He neglected Duo Rani and gave her a broken home, a deaf and dumb maid, torn clothes and a dirty bed.

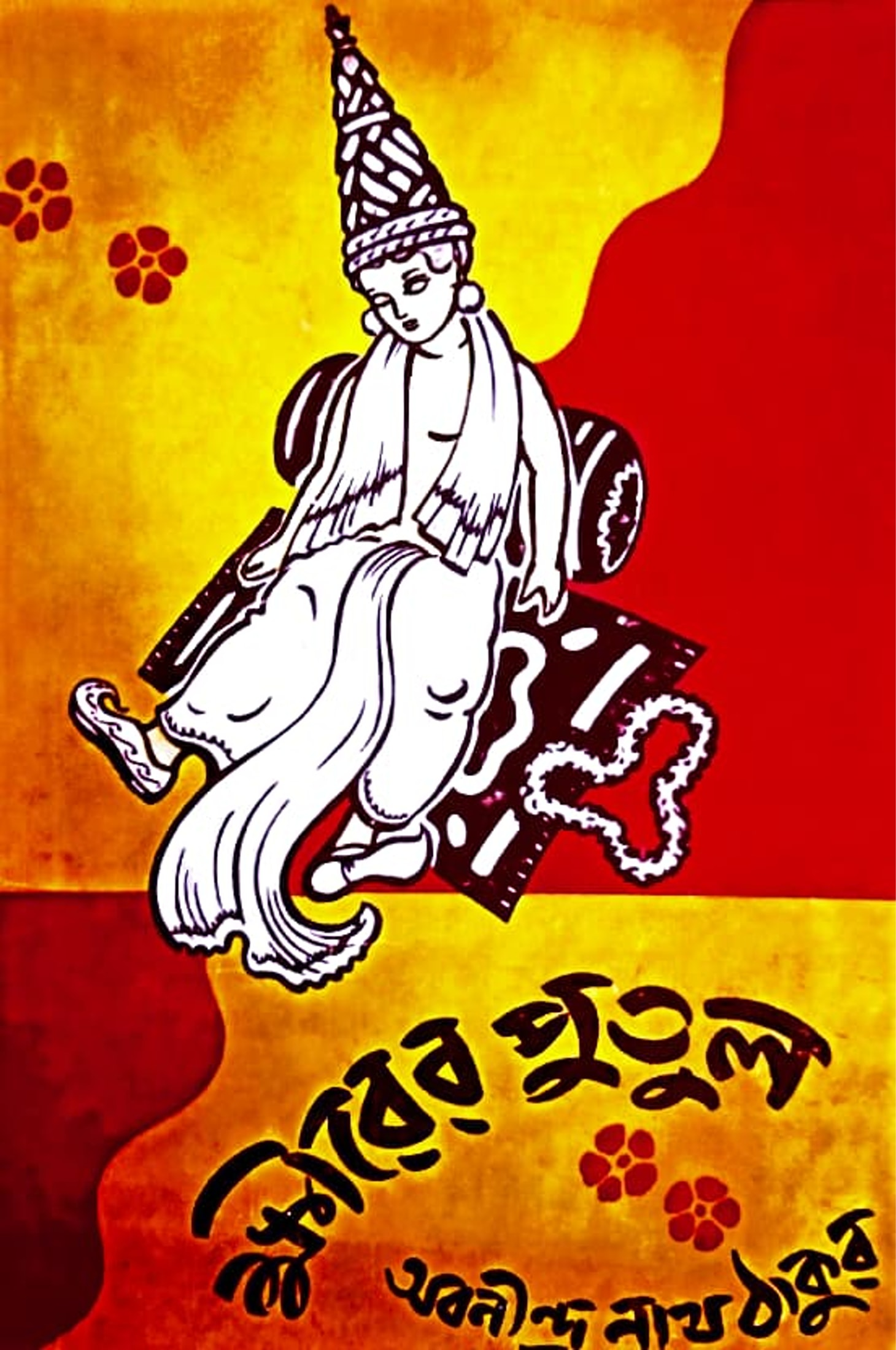
Khirer Putul

== Translations ==
The work has been translated into several languages:

- French – La poupée de fromage.
- Swedish – Ostdockan.
- English – The Make-Believe Prince; Caramel Doll.

== Development ==
Abanindranath who was Rabindranath Tagore's nephew found this story in Rabindranath's wife Mrinalini Devi's diary after her death. The novel is based on the story written in her diary. The illustrations were done by Abanindranath Tagore.

== Analysis ==
=== Tale type ===
According to scholar Sanjay Sircar, the story can be classified in the Aarne-Thompson-Uther Index as tale type ATU 459, "The Make-Believe Son (Daughter)", a tale type "widespread throughout North India and other Asian areas, but never found in Europe". Similarly, German scholar Ulrich Marzolph listed four Iranian variants of the same type, which he named Der Prinz verliebt sich in eine Puppe ("The Prince falls in love with a Doll").

=== Variants ===
In a tale collected by Sunity Devi, Maharani of Coochbehar, with the title The Monkey, a Maharajah has two Maharanis, the elder good and the younger jealous of the attention their husband dotes on her, so she threatens to leave him or to kill herself if the elder Maharani is still in the palace. Reluctantly, the king moves the elder out to another house outside the kingdom, and he keeps visiting her. One day, the king goes on a journey and asks his co-wives which presents he can bring them: the younger wants emeralds and rubies, while the elder one wants nothing at first. After much insistence from her husband, she asks for a simple request, a monkey. He travels afar and buys the jewels, but remembers on the last day about the monkey and mentions it aloud. Suddenly, he sees a monkey on a branch and orders some soldiers to capture it, but the animal comes down from a branch and walks towards the monarch. The Maharajah takes the monkey and returns home, then gifts the two ranis their respective gifts. The elder Maharani explains that, since she has no child, the monkey can fill that absence. The younger Maharani believes that the monkey would serve to further cause people to dislike her rival, but the monkey does the opposite: the elder Maharani treats the animal like a son and sends messages through him to the Maharajah, who begins to like the monkey, even more so after he learns the monkey can speak. In time, the young Maharani has a son, which hurts the monkey's feelings, since he wishes his mother could have the same happiness. Thus, he meets the king and lies that the elder Maharani also had a son, but the king cannot see him yet. When the king performs the Atkaora festival for the real son's eight day after his birth, the monkey wants to have the same festival done to his "younger brother", so the king gifts the monkey lavish gifts. The monkey also requests money from the Maharajah, which greatly troubles the elder queen if the king discovers their ruse. Years later, the young Maharani's son is old enough and a wedding is arranged for him. The monkey goes to another kingdom on behalf of the Maharajah and arranges a wedding between a princess and the elder Maharani's false son, by saying he is a handsome prince. The animal returns to the elder Maharani's palace and explains she will have a daughter-in-law very soon, but the queen says she has not even a son, so she worries the monkey is acting against her best interest, since the king may learn of everything being a lie and order her to be beheaded. The monkey assuages her fears by saying she is the elder queen and should have her proper position, then asks her to fetch milk, cook it into khir and fashion a doll out of it. The young Maharani's son marries an ugly and unclever bride, and people mock him and his mother for it. The monkey comes in the Maharajah's quarters and says his other son, the elder queen's, should have also a wedding feast, but the king wishes to see his son. The monkey, however, tells the king that the prince will appear with his bride in due time. A palki is brought to the elder queen's palace, and only the monkey and the queen arrange the finished khir doll inside the palki, dressed with a red silk costume, and see the doll off as the marriage retinue and the musicians depart with the false prince. On the road, the retinue stops to rest, including the monkey. A cat appears, enters the palki and eats the khir effigy. The monkey wakes up, chastises the cat and orders for the doll back, but the feline cannot return it. However, the cat offers a deal: he can give the monkey a boy from his goddess (since the tale explains cats are the "carriers" of deity Shashthi, who brings children to Earth). The feline takes the moneky to a cave full of living boys of many ages, and the monkey chooses one of the children to replace the missing khir doll. The youth marries the princess the monkey arranged for him in a grand ceremony. Meanwhile, the elder Maharani worries about the monkey and regrets that she requested for one. The Maharajah waits for his son's retinue, but suspects something strange after only the servants return from the other kingdom. The bride and bridegroom arrive some days later in a gold mahapaya. The king rejoices that he can see his "son" for the first time bringing home a beautiful daughter-in-law. The elder Maharani worries that the king will discover the ruse and kill her, but the monkey bids her come to the courtyard to see her son. The elder Maharani finally meets her son. The Maharajah banishes the younger queen and her son, and names the elder Maharani's son as his rightful heir.

== Adaptations ==
The story was adapted into a film of the same name by Indian writer and director Purnendu Pattrea in 1976. Khirer Putul, an Indian television soap opera based on the novel aired on Zee Bangla in 2020.

It was also adapted into a play by the Indian theatre group Nandikar in 2017, with Anindita Chakraborty as its director.

== See also ==
- The Wax Prince
- The Daughter of the Childless King
