= XYZ v. State of Maharashtra =

Indian LGBT Rights Case Law

- Court: Bombay High Court
- Full case name: XYZ & Anr. versus State of Maharashtra & Ors.
- Decided: TBA
- Citations: C.W.P. No. 11737 of 2023: 5 July 2023; 28 July 2023

Court membership
- Judges sitting: Revati Mohite Dere, J. and Gauri Godse J.

Case opinions
- Decision by: Revati Mohite Dere J. and Gauri Godse J.

Keywords
- Cohabitation Rights, Queer Relationships, Police Misconduct

XYZ & Anr. versus State of Maharashtra & Ors. (2023) is an ongoing case of Bombay High Court, which is considering comprehensive measures to sensitize the society and various branches of the State Government of Maharashtra to remove prejudices against the queer community.

== Background ==
The first petitioner, aged 28, holds dual degrees and is not a resident of Maharashtra. The second petitioner, a 32-year-old hospital worker, resides in Maharashtra. Having met on social media in 2020, the petitioners are engaged in a consensual same-sex relationship and have chosen to live together. The first petitioner, of her own volition, left her home to cohabit with the second petitioner in Maharashtra. It's worth noting that the first petitioner had previously attempted to live with the second petitioner but was compelled to return home by her parents. Emphasizing their status as adults, the petitioners highlight the importance of respecting their consensual relationship and request for the right to live free from police intervention or parental interference.

The petitioners sought directives from the Bench to secure suitable protection for one of them, aiming to safeguard her life, liberty, and dignity, while also requesting that no coercive measures be taken against the petitioner.

== Proceedings ==
On 5 July 2023, the petitioners requested directives from the Bench to ensure adequate protection for one of them, aiming to safeguard her life, liberty, and dignity, while also making a plea to avoid any coercive actions against the petitioner.In response, the Maharashtra Police assured to provide protection by assigning a plainclothes constable to the same-sex couple, who had expressed concerns about potential threats from one partner's family.

On 28 July 2023, the petitioners' counsel urged the court to establish guidelines for the police in handling cases involving queer individuals. This includes situations where missing person complaints are filed or when allegations of kidnapping or false imprisonment are raised by family members or relatives of queer individuals. Furthermore, the petitioners' counsel also sought the issuance of guidelines to prison authorities for cases involving jail inmates from the queer community.

On 11 August 2023, the bench made verbal reference to the guidelines set forth in the case of S Sushma v. Commissioner of Police, which are designed to safeguard same-sex couples from police harassment, along with the directives within the same case that urged the State Government of Tamil Nadu to introduce sensitization programs across various departments within the state. The bench proposed that the State Government of Maharashtra contemplate amending the rules for the police conduct in a manner similar to those in Tamil Nadu.

== See also ==
- LGBT rights in India
- S Sushma v. Commissioner of Police (2021)
- Adhila Nasarin v. State Commissioner of Police (2022)
- Navtej Singh Johar v. Union of India (2018)
