= Ek Chatur Naar =

Indian Hindi-language dark-comedy

- Theatrical release poster
- Directed by: Umesh Shukla
- Screenplay by: Jay Master; Umesh Shukla; Deepak Nirman; Siddhaarth Goel
- Story by: Himanshu Tripathi
- Produced by: Umesh Shukla; Ashish Wagh; Shivv Sharma; Zeeshan Ahmad
- Starring: Divya Khosla Kumar; Neil Nitin Mukesh
- Cinematography: Sameer Arya
- Edited by: Mayur Hardas
- Music by: Score: Amar Mohile; Songs: Vayu; Abhijeet Shrivastava; Sharan Rawat
- Production company: Merry Go Round Studios
- Distributed by: PVR Inox Pictures
- Release date: 12 September 2025
- Running time: 131 minutes
- Country: India
- Language: Hindi
- Box office: est. ₹3.20 crore

Ek Chatur Naar (A Clever Woman) is a 2025 Indian Hindi-language black comedy thriller film directed by Umesh Shukla and produced by Shukla, Ashish Wagh, Zeeshan Ahmad, and Shivv Sharma. It was produced by Merry Go Round Studios, with T-Series Films serving as the presenter. It stars Divya Khosla Kumar and Neil Nitin Mukesh.

The film was theatrically released on 12 September 2025.

== Plot ==
Mamta Mishra (Divya Khosla Kumar) is a widow living in poverty with her young son Sonu and her mother-in-law. She is constantly hiding from Thakur's debt collectors—her late husband owed them money she still cannot repay.

Abhishek Verma (Neil Nitin Mukesh), a government contractor, is extremely wealthy thanks to the money he and his political allies—including Minister Qureshi (Zakir Hussain)—have stolen from the government and the public.

One day, on his way to an important meeting with Qureshi, Abhishek's car is involved in an accident. To reach the meeting on time, he decides to take the metro. At the station, his phone is stolen. Mamta, who works as a staff member at the metro station, sees this on CCTV and rushes out to chase the thief, but returns empty-handed.

It is then revealed that Mamta had secretly conspired with the thief. She had asked him to steal a phone so she could gift it to her son for his birthday—something she could not afford.

Meanwhile, Abhishek panics, realizing the stolen phone contains confidential information about his corrupt dealings and his affair with his secretary Tina Gupta (Heli Daruwala). He asks his policeman friend Triloki (Sushant Singh) to urgently recover the phone. Triloki begins the investigation.

At home, Mamta discovers the incriminating data on the phone—videos, messages, proof of corruption, and evidence of Abhishek's affair. She changes her plan and contacts Abhishek, demanding Rs 2 crore in ransom. Abhishek refuses.

Triloki quickly uncovers Mamta's involvement and raids her house. Not finding Mamta at home, the police detains her mother-in-law and demands Mamta surrender herself with the phone in exchange for her release.

When Abhishek returns home, he is shocked to see Mamta there—hired by his wife as a cleaner. Terrified she might expose his affair, he pretends not to know her and tries to act normal. Mamta uses this to her advantage, forcing Abhishek to secure the release of her mother-in-law.

Over the next few days, Mamta cleverly fuels tension between Abhishek, Tina, and Qureshi, making them suspicious of one another.

After several failed attempts to forcibly retrieve the phone, Abhishek kidnaps Sonu from school, demanding Mamta hand over the device. Mamta rushes to the location and is beaten by Abhishek's men, but still refuses to give up the phone. Abhishek then threatens to kill Sonu—but Mamta laughs and reveals she tricked him into kidnapping the wrong child. The boy he took is actually Thakur's son, the gangster to whom her husband owed money.

Soon, Tina, Qureshi, Triloki, and Thakur all arrive at the scene. Mamta reveals, using Abhishek's own messages, that Abhishek has been betraying Qureshi. A heated argument breaks out among the group. Triloki then reveals that he has recorded everything on his phone. Using the recording as evidence, he orders raids on both Qureshi's and Abhishek's properties.

In the final twist, Mamta reveals that it was Abhishek whose scam drove her husband into debt and ultimately suicide. Triloki's father was also one of Abhishek's victims. The theft of Abhishek's phone was not random—the entire operation was carefully planned by Mamta and Triloki to expose his crimes.

With no escape, Abhishek grabs Sonu and holds him at gunpoint while attempting to flee. He is struck and killed by an oncoming train. The corruption scandal is exposed, leading to the arrest of Qureshi and Tina.

== Cast ==
- Divya Khosla Kumar as Mamta Mishra
- Neil Nitin Mukesh as Abhishek Verma
- Chhaya Kadam as Radha, Mamta's mother in law
- Sushant Singh as Inspector Triloki
- Rajneesh Duggal as Sudheer (Mamta's Husband)
- Zakir Hussain as Qureshi
- Rahul Mittra as politician Dindayal Thakur
- Yashpal Sharma as Thakur
- Heli Daruwala as Secretary Tina
- Rose Sardana as Anjali
- Geeta Agarwal Sharma as Urmila
- Kumar Saurabh as Abdul
- Anil Rastogi as Old Neighbour
- Sandeep Yadav as Pa Dubey
- Danesh Gandhi as Sushil
- Baby Kartikey as Mamta's new born son

== Release ==
=== Theatrical release ===
The film was theatrically released on 12 September 2025.

== Soundtrack ==
The songs of the film are composed by Vayu and Sharan Rawat, while Amar Mohile gives the film's background score. The lyrics are written by Vayu. The songs are distributed by T-Series music label.

No.	Title	Lyrics	Music	Singer	Length
1.	"Ek Chatur Naar Title Track"	Vayu	Vayu, Sharan Rawat	Kailash Kher	2:29
2.	"Gulabi Saawariya"	Shayra Apoorva	Abhijeet Srivastava	Sachet Tandon; Shilpa Rao	3:13

== Reception ==
Subhash K Jha writing for News 24 gave 3.5 stars out of 5 and said that " It is so heartening to see our cinema get out of the hero-heroine-villain claptrap, to explore the wicked side of every character, good, bad and ugly." Dhaval Roy of The Times of India rated it 3/5 stars and said that "Ek Chatur Naar may not be razor-sharp, but it stands firmly within the space of smart comedies." Rishabh Suri of Hindustan Times observed that "Overall, Ek Chatur Naar wants to be the clever fox of revenge dramas, but it too often ends up chasing its own tail. Entertaining in parts but uneven in execution, it leaves you wishing the smarts had matched the setup."

Yatamanyu Narain of News 18 gave 4 stars out of 5 and stated that "Divya Khosla delivers her career-best as Mamta, while Neil Nitin Mukesh shines in Umesh Shukla’s wickedly funny and thrilling black comedy." Divya Nair of Rediff.com gave 1 stars out of 5 and observed that "The only saving grace is the title score by Amar Mohile, which injects some energy into this otherwise pointless attempt at a dark revenge drama." Devesh Sharma of Filmfare gave 3 stars out of 5 and said that "Ek Chatur Naar is a revenge comedy which takes up cudgels against the various banking scams and injustice to farmers." Troy Ribeiro of Free Press Journal rated it 3/5 stars and stated that "The film misses the chance to fully embrace Mamta’s cunning nature, presenting her as earnest rather than sly. An abrupt genre shift and reliance on convenient plot twists in the denouement undermine its impact."
