= Kaikudunna Nilavu =

- Theatrical release poster
- Directed by: Kamal
- Written by: Ranjith
- Produced by: Kalliyoor Sasi; P. M. Basheer
- Starring: Jayaram; Dileep; Ranjitha; Shalini
- Cinematography: P. Sukumar
- Edited by: K. Rajagopal
- Music by: Kaithapram
- Production company: United Vision
- Distributed by: Surya Cine Arts
- Release date: 3 April 1998
- Country: India
- Language: Malayalam

Kaikudunna Nilavu is a 1998 Indian Malayalam-language crime drama film directed by Kamal and written by Ranjith. The film stars Jayaram, Dileep, Ranjitha, and Shalini in the lead roles. The film has songs by Kaithapram. The background score was by Johnson. The film was dubbed in Tamil as Nilave Unakkaga. The film was an average run at the box office.

== Plot ==
Balakrishnan, an aged musician, along with his granddaughter Veni, arrive at the Brihadeshwara Temple in Thanjavur, seeking asylum. There, they cross paths with Mahendran and his family, consisting of his grandparents and friend Lakshmanan, who are visiting the temple as part of a pilgrimage. Balakrishnan was an acquaintance of Mahendran's late father, a district collector, and thus the two families become familiar. One day, Mahendran saves Balakrishnan and Veni from Subhramaniyan, a distant relative who is hunting them for an unpaid debt and has an eye on Veni. Balakrishanan is constantly on the run with Veni, due to his fear of Subhramaniyan. That night, Balakrishnan dies in his sleep. After performing Balakrishnan's final rites, Mahendran and his family decide to take Veni back with them to their home, Sreemangalam.

Back at home, a few hijinks ensue as Veni gets settled in to a new life. A few problems and confusions happen in the form of Bhama, Mahendran's childhood sweetheart, feeling jealous of Mahendran and Veni's closeness. One day, they find Veni writing a love letter, and after some further enquiry, learn that there is a boy named Kichamani aka Kichan, whom Veni loves. Kichamani was sent away by Balakrishnan after he clashed with Subhramaniyan. In order to make Veni happy, Mahendran decides to find and bring Kichamani to Sreemangalam.

After some searching, he finds Kichamani, only to realize that a new problem has unfolded. After learning that Balakrishnan had died, Kichamani went to find Veni at the temple, but instead crossed paths with Subhramaniyan, who is also hunting Veni. In an ensuing fight, Kichamani accidentally kills Subhramaniyan, and has been in hiding since. The case is big, due to it happening within the temple, but the lack of witnesses or proof leaves it open. Kichamani however is overcome with guilt for what he did. Mahendran convinces him that everything will turn out all right and reunites Kichamani and Veni.

As they all adjust to a new life, and Kichamani and Veni's wedding is fixed, a new problem arises in the form of Hameed Rawther, a Tamil Nadu Police officer in charge of solving the murder case. Following a trail of clues and suspicions, Rawther reaches Sreemangalam in search of Kichamani, and ends up staying there as a guest. A game of wits unfolds between Rawther and Mahendran, the former driven by his sense of justice and the latter by his desperation to protect Kichamani, and by extension Veni.

Eventually, overcome by guilt, Kichamani agrees to surrender and secretly tells the truth to a heartbroken Veni. But before Rawther can apprehend him, Kichamani and Veni attempt suicide. Though they survive, Mahendran is broken by their sadness. In a moment of self sacrifice, Mahendran asks Rawther to arrest him as the culprit, in order to save Kichamani. Reluctantly, Rawther arrests Mahendran and takes him away, to the sadness of his family and friends. However at the Kerala - Tamil Nadu border, Rawther's conscience gets the better of him, and he lets Mahendran go, willing to accept a suspension or even a dismissal for the same, and plans to let Subhramaniyan's case die down unsolved. As Rawther crosses the border and leaves, Mahendran starts his journey back to his awaiting family and friends, with the simple hope that they never have to meet another problem ever again.

== Cast ==
- Jayaram as Mahendran/Mahi
- Dileep as Kichamani/Kichan
- Ranjitha as Bhama
- Shalini as Veni
- Bharath Gopi as Balakrishnan, Veni's grandfather
- Unnikrishnan Namboothiri as Muthassan
- Kalabhavan Mani as Lakshmanan
- Augustine as Police Constable Madhavan
- Nandu as Sathyan, Kichamani's friend
- P Sukumar as Subhramaniyan
- Murali as DySP Hameed Rawther, Tamilnadu Police Officer
- T. P. Madhavan as Janardhanan, Bhama's father

== Soundtrack ==
All lyrics are written by Gireesh Puthenchery; all music is composed by Kaithapram Damodaran.

No.	Title	Artist(s)	Length
1.	"Iniyum Paribhavam"	K. J. Yesudas, K. S. Chithra
2.	"Iniyum Paribhavam" (Female)	K. S. Chithra
3.	"Kaaveri Theerathe" (Female)	K. S. Chithra
4.	"Kaaveri Theerathe" (Male)	K. J. Yesudas
5.	"Malayannaarkkannan Maarkazhithumpiye" (Duet)	K. J. Yesudas, Sujatha Mohan
6.	"Malayannaarkkannan Maarkazhithumpiye" (Female)	Sujatha Mohan
7.	"Mangala Deepavumaay" (Male)	M. G. Sreekumar
8.	"Mangala Deepavumaay" (Female)	K. S. Chithra, Shabnam
9.	"Vaalittu Kannezhuthum"	K. J. Yesudas
