= Santosh Shukla =

Politician from Kanpur, Uttar Pradesh, India

Minister of State (Uttar Pradesh)
- In office 2000–2001

Personal details
- Died: October 2001 Shivli police station, Kanpur Dehat district, Uttar Pradesh, India
- Party: Bharatiya Janata Party

Santosh Shukla was a politician from Kanpur, Uttar Pradesh, India, affiliated with the Bharatiya Janata Party. He served as the Minister of State in chief minister Rajnath Singh's cabinet from 2000 to 2001.

== Political career ==
In 1996, Santosh Shukla contested the assembly election from the Chaubepur Assembly constituency on a BJP ticket. He stood second by securing 43418 votes. He was made the Minister of State in Rajnath Singh's ministry. He was also the chairman of the Labor Contract Board.

== Death ==
In October 2001, he was shot dead allegedly by Vikas Dubey, a BSP leader and gangster along with his 7 henchmen armed with rifles and country-made pistols inside the Shivli police station. Vikas Dubey was the prime accused in the killing of Santosh Shukla. Dubey was arrested but was later released, allegedly due to his political influence.
