= Lok Adalat =

System of alternative dispute resolution in India

Lok Adalat (People's Court or People's Tribunal)
Agency overview
- Formed: 1987
- Jurisdiction: Supreme Court of India
- Status: Active
- Headquarters: New Delhi, India
- Agency executives: CJI Bhushan Ramkrishna Gavai, Patron-in-Chief; Justice Surya Kant, Executive Chairman
- Website: https://nalsa.gov.in/home

Lok Adalat (transl. People's Court or People's Tribunal) is a statutory organization in India, under the Legal Services Authorities Act, 1987. It was created as an alternative dispute resolution mechanism in India to resolve disputes/grievances outside the conventional court system. It is a forum where cases pending before panchayat, or at a pre-litigation stage in a court of law, are settled. Under this Act, the award (decision) made by the Lok Adalats is deemed to be a civil court case and is final and binding on all parties. No formal appeal against such an award lies before any court of law. However, if the parties are not satisfied with the award of the Lok Adalat they are still free to initiate litigation by approaching the court of appropriate jurisdiction. The first Lok Adalats were held in Gujarat in 1982 and in Chennai in 1986.

Section 22 B of The Legal Services Authorities Act 1987 provides for the establishment of Permanent Lok Adalats (PLA) for exercising jurisdiction in respect of one or more public utility services (PUS). Section 22 A of The Legal Services Authorities Act 1987 states what constitutes 'Public Utility Services' for the purpose of Permanent Lok Adalat.

Lok Adalats are constituted at below levels-National, State, District, and Taluk:

- State Authorities.
- High Court.
- District and Taluk level.

Types of Lok Adalat:

- Permanent Lok Adalat - Provides a mechanism for disposing of cases relating to public utility services, transport, postal, and telegraph.
- National Lok Adalat - Since 2015, these have been held every month on specific topics across India. They are held on a single day disposing of a large number of pending cases.
- Mega Lok Adalat - Held across all courts in the state on a single day.
- Mobile Lok Adalats - These types of Lok Adalats are organized occasionally, and they travel from one place to another across the country to help resolve disputes.

Lok Adalats come under National Legal Services Authority and the respective State Legal Services Authority.

The National Legal Services Authority (NALSA) stated that the 2nd National Lok Adalat of 2026, organised nationwide on 9 May 2026, led to the resolution of more than 2.07 crore cases. These included over 1.87 crore pre-litigation matters and around 20 lakh pending cases, with the total settlement value exceeding Rs 3,440 crore.

== Mechanism ==
The following types of cases can be admitted in Lok Adalat.

1. Any dispute or case pending in any court of law in India:

- Criminal offenses which is compoundable.
- Cases under section 138 of the Negotiable Instruments Act.
- Issues relating to the recovery of money.
- Issues under the Indian Motor Vehicles Act, 1988.
- Issues relating to labour disputes.
- Issues relating to public utility bills such as electricity or water, excluding non-compoundable offenses.
- Issues relating to matrimony.

2. Any dispute that is planned to be filed in Court but did not come up for a hearing. Following Pre-Litigation, cases can also be filed in Lok-Adalat:

- Cases under section 138 of the Negotiable Instruments Act.
- Cases relating to the recovery of money.
- Issues relating to labour disputes.
- Issues relating to public utility bills such as electricity or water, excluding non-compoundable offenses.
- General maintenance-related disputes.
- Other miscellaneous cases that are civil disputes, criminal compoundable cases, and matrimonial disputes.

However, any legal issue that is not compoundable as per the Indian legal system cannot be taken up in the Lok Adalat.

The Lok Adalat is presided over by Members, who have the role of statutory conciliators only but no judicial role. They can only persuade the parties to come to a settlement. Sometimes counseling sessions are also held between opposing parties.

The main condition of the Lok Adalat is that both parties in dispute agree to settlement and if they are unable to do so, the Permanent Lok Adalat gets jurisdiction to decide the case, provided it is not related to any offense.

No court fee is charged, and if a court matter is referred to the Lok Adalat and is settled subsequently, the court fee originally paid in the court on the complaints/petition is refunded to the parties.

Procedural laws and the Evidence Act are not strictly followed while assessing claims.

Decisions are binding on the parties and their order is capable of execution through a legal process.

Lok Adalat is effective in the settlement of money claims. Disputes like partition suits, damages, and matrimonial cases can be easily settled before Lok Adalat, as the scope for compromise through an approach of give and take is high. A Lok Adalat can take up civil cases (including marriage and family disputes) and compoundable criminal cases. The decision of a Lok Adalat deciding any case coming before it is deemed as final, and any award or decree issued is enforceable on competing parties. Additionally, the issued order cannot be recalled or reviewed by the court.

Lok Adalat, as per the Supreme Court judgement, is formed to arrive at a compromise or solution between parties in dispute and hence does not have jurisdiction to go into the merits of the complaint.

Lok Adalat or Alternate Dispute Resolution (ADR) system was strengthened by the Government of India in 2021 by introducing the Draft Mediation bill, 2021, which added many provisions for fast and efficient resolution through this system.

== Permanent Lok Adalat ==
The Permanent Lok Adalat (PUS) is a civil court whose main purpose is to summon a person or document. Permanent Lok Adalats are set up at the State Level in India, which in principle follows the Lok Adalat at the National level. The Permanent Lok Adalat is composed of a chairperson (who is a serving or a retired District and Sessions Judge or a Judicial Officer higher in the rank) and two other persons (or members performing judicial duties). It deals with cases relating to public utility services such as transport, postal, or telegraph, and is formed as a pre-dispute platform for making conciliatory efforts between parties. The PLA (PUS) is not bound by the Civil Procedure Code or the Indian Evidence Act of 1872. It has wide powers to devise its own procedures. The decisions of the Permanent Lok Adalats are binding and are not subject to appeal.

The pecuniary jurisdiction of PLA (PUS) is up to Rs. 1 crore, while in cases that have no direct monetary connection, the PLA (PUS) can pass any order within the wider ambit of the Statutory and Constitutional mandate. The court of Permanent Lok Adalat (PUS) has been set up country-wide in Uttar Pradesh, Delhi, Haryana, Kerala, Rajasthan, Punjab, and Andhra Pradesh. Uttar Pradesh has the highest number of functional Permanent Lok Adalat (PUS). It has more than 50 Courts of PLA (PUS) in as many districts. They operate in Kanpur Nagar, Allahabad, Lucknow, Aligarh, Baghpat, Meerut, Ghaziabad, and Gautam Buddha Nagar.

As of 30 September 2015, more than 15.14 lakhs Lok Adalats have been organized in the country since its inception. More than 8.25 crore cases have been settled by this mechanism so far.

== See also ==
- Gram Nyayalayas Act, 2008
- Legal Services Authorities Act 1987
