= The Daughter of the Childless King =

Indian folktale collected in Bihar

The Daughter of the Childless King is an Indian folktale collected in Bihar. In it, a queen devises a ruse to trick the king into believing she gave birth to the child he desired. She goes to great lengths to keep the deceit until the daughter's marriage, when the false princess is to be presented to her potential bridegroom. At the marriage, an animal takes the place of the false image, or is presented as the royal child, but eventually gains human form permanently.

The tale is classified in the international Aarne-Thompson-Uther Index as tale type ATU 459, "The Make-Believe Son (Daughter)", wherein a queen tricks the king by fashioning an image of a human child or placing an animal to keep up appearances that she gave birth to an heir, but eventually her creation gains human life. According to scholars, the tale type is mostly attested in North India and in Asia.

== Summary ==
In this tale, a king lives in Bihar. Since he is childless, he performs rites in order to sire a child, to no avail. One day, a sweeper woman passes by his palace and spits at him. He sends for the woman, who tries to dismiss her actions, but is forced to explain that she saw a childless person by daybreak, which can bring misfortune for the rest of the day. The king decides to not punish the sweeper woman and decides to leave the palace in the dead of the night. However, one of the queen's maids sights him and says that he should not leave now that the queen is expecting a child.

The queen hires an astrologer to divine the future: the astrologer predicts the queen shall bear a daughter that will be very lucky, but the king cannot visit the queen until the baby is born, lest she gives birth to a dead child. Even when the princess is born, the astrologer forbids the king from meeting his daughter, only at her marriage. The king obeys the interdictions to avoid dangers, per the astrologer's predictions. To keep up appearances, the queen buys a bird and ties jingling bells to its feet, then the maids tell the king the princess is moving with ghungrus on her feet. The king keeps buying ornaments for his "daughter" and waits impatiently for the chance to see her, so, after twelve years, he arranges a marriage.

The barat, the musicians and the retinue come to prepare to take the princess, but the queen, worried, consults with the astrologer. The astrologer advises that the princess should not be seen in person, due to the risk of dying, so they place a lota in place of the bride and celebrate the marriage. At the moment of the bida (carrying the bride to the bridegroom's house), the queen goes to talk to the prince and shows him the bird which she says she reared as a daughter, so she is entrusting the animal to him. The prince promises to take care of the queen's bird, and its birdcage is secretly placed in the doli by the queen's apartment.

The prince goes home with his "bride", places the birdcage in his quarters, on the bed, and asks that his bride is not to be seen by anyone. His mother agrees to the terms of his strange request. In his chambers, the prince feeds the birdwife. Later, the prince's youngest brother is to be married, and the whole palace is afoot with preparations. The prince's mother goes to talk to him to let his "wife" out of the room. The prince asks if other servants can replace her, but the queen explains that the women of the house are needed for this task (dehusking the rice). The prince tells his mother he will ask his "wife" is she can do it, and explains the task to the bird. The bird agrees to dehusk the rice, goes into the forest and summons other birds to help in the task.

Lastly, the prince has to take a leave of absence and worries about who is going to feed and give water to the bird. The bird advises the prince to place a week worth of food and water, and it will be fine. However, after the prince leaves, the bird accidentally tumbles its water, so it decides to replenish its water: it opens its cage and carries the pot to a pond to draw water. The bird fills the pot with water, but cannot fly with it since the pot is too heavy, try as it might. Suddenly, deities Shiva and Parvati pass by, and the goddess takes pity on the bird's plight, so she asks Shiva to help the animal. Shiva tells Parvati she needs to make a cut on her little finger and anoint the bird's head. By doing this, the bird turns into a beautiful young girl. Now human, the girl kneels in gratitude in front of the Devi, who gives her blessings to the girl's marriage.

The prince returns home, but finds only the empty birdcage, worrying about his birdwife. However, he notices a beautiful girl taking the dust off his feet, and realizes she is the birdwife, now human. He introduces her to his family, who admire their daughter-in-law's beauty.

== Analysis ==
=== Tale type ===
The tale is classified in the international Aarne-Thompson-Uther Index as tale type ATU 459, "The Make-Believe Son (Daughter)": a queen fashions a false image of a child (son or daughter) or a servant finds an animal to convince her husband, the childless king, that she gave birth, and continues the ruse until it is time to marry the royal child; the queen worries that the king will discover the deceit and thinks of killing herself, but deities take pity on the queen and transform the image or animal into a human person.

=== Motifs ===
According to Stith Thompson and Jonas Balys study of motifs of Indian literature and oral folklore, the tale contains the motif D350., "Transformation: bird to person".

== Variants ==
According to scholarship, tale type ATU 459 is "widespread throughout North India and other Asian areas, but never found in Europe".

=== The Story of Ghose ===
Author Alice Elizabeth Dracott collected an Indian tale in Simla with the title The Story of Ghose. In this tale, a Ranee has no children, but has a pet squirrel she feeds and takes care of. One day, she has an idea to trick her husband, the Rajah, she gave birth to an heir: she bribes the nurse to tell the king a daughter was born to him. The Brahmin goes to see the princess for himself, but the Ranee persuades him to keep up the lie that she had a daughter, where there is only the squirrel as the Ranee's pet. The Brahmin tells the Rajah father and daughter must not see each other for twelve yeare, otherwise they will both die. After twelve years, the Ranee convinces the Rajah to arrange a marriage between their "daughter" and a prince of a good family, and their daughter must not be seen until after the marriage. The Brahmin finds a royal family of seven sons in another city, and arranges a wedding between the youngest prince, called Shahzadah, with the false princess. A feast is held, and the Ranee hides the squirrel inside the dooly or bridal litter that is to carry the bride to her bridegroom. Prince Shahzadah welcomes the bride and sees who she is inside the dooly: a little squirrel, to his sadness. Despite the situation, the prince keeps up appearances of a good marriage, but asks to live with his wife away from his brothers and any woman from the palace, in another house. The prince's family agrees to his terms, but believe that this is to keep his beautiful wife hidden. One day, the prince's elder sister-in-law complains about doing all the hard work and wants her newest sister-in-law to help them. Prince Shahzadah worries about the little squirrel doing any work, but she offers to do it: first, she is to plaster fhe floor (leepo), then, to grind corn in the handmill; thirdly, to prepare goolgoolah, a dish made with goor, flour, and water and fried in ghee. The squirrel wife manages to plaster the floor with her tail and grind the corn with her teeth. When she tries to prepare the goolgoolah, she cannot do it due to her small size. Deities Mahadeo and Parbatti (sic) are walking by sunrise when Parbatti sees the squirrel and asks her husband Mahadeo to turn the squirrel into a human person. Mahadeo refuses it at first, but agrees to do it: he cuts his finger and sprinkles his blood on the squirrel, turning her into a beautiful princess. (Note: This element is classified, according to Stith Thompson and Jonas Balys study of motifs of Indian literature and oral folklore, as motif D315.2, "Transformation: squirrel to person".) The now human princess finishes preparing the dish to serve everyone, and the royal family marvels at her beauty. Prince Shahzadah worries about the little squirrel, calling her "Ghose", when his sisters-in-law mock him, saying that his wife is with them at the palace. The prince thinks they are mocking him, and the princess appears to him in person, explaining she was the squirrel. The prince rejoices at this turn of events, and the princess writes to her human parents to come visit them. The Rajah sees his "daughter" for the first time and is pleased at her beauty.

=== The Cat Who Became a Queen ===
British reverend James Hinton Knowles published a Kashmiri folktale collected from an informant named Rází, a panditani who lived in Srinagar. In this tale, titled The Cat Who Became a Queen, a monarch in Kashmir bemoans the fact that he has no heirs, goes to his zánana and threatens his co-wives with banishment if any of them fail to bear a son within a year. The women pray to Shiva for any of them to give birth, to no avail, thus they decide to formulate a ruse: a female cat gives birth to a litter of kittens, so they take one and pretend that one of the queens gave birth to a princess. The king wishes to see his daughter, but the co-wives lie that the Brahmins have advised that the princess can only be seen by her father on her wedding day. Still, the king agrees to the terms, but checks on her development from time to time, and sends his councillors to arrange a marriage between the princess and a suitable bridegroom. The co-queens take into account the bridegroom, a prince, would know of the ruse, and decide to reveal it to him, making him promise not to tell his parents about it. Their marriage is celebrated, and the cat princess is brought on a palanquin to the prince's country. The prince takes care of the cat and places her inside him room, not allowing even his parents to see her. One day, the prince is away and the cat is inside his room, when the prince's mother knocks on the door and laments that her mysterious daughter-in-law cannot leave. The cat understands the queen's words and laments that she is but an animal. Goddess Párvatí listens to the cat's woes and asks her husband Shiva to help her. Shiva advises the cat to smear some oil in her fur, which she can find in the same room. The cat spreads the oil on her fur, turning herself into a beautiful human princess, (Note: This element is classified, according to Stith Thompson and Jonas Balys study of motifs of Indian literature and oral folklore, as motif D342, "Transformation: cat to person".) leaving only a spot of fur to indicate she was the cat. After the prince returns, he meets his wife, now a beautiful princess, and travels to his parents-in-law kingdom to show her to her "parents". The king sees his "daughter" for the first time, and the co-queens are happy and relieved that their prayers were answered.

=== The Bird (Kandha people) ===
In a tale collected from the Kandha people, in Balangir District, Odisha, with the Kandha title Bati Chere and translated as The Bird, a king has two wives and is childless, so he marries a third wife, but is still childless. However, the third queen's pet bird, called Bati Chere, which is also her confidante, hatches a plan and lies to the king that the third queen is pregnant. Bati Chere keeps the lie for ten months and announces the birth of a princess, whom the king must not see until she is old enough. Bati Chere then tells the monarch to search for a suitor for the princess. The king brings a groom and Bati Chere prepares a state on whom the prince can place the wedding garland. Bati Chere returns home with the prince's dowry and promises to bring his bride. The bird goes to the Ganga River to pray to Lord Shiva, who blesses the bird, referred to as female, with two beads: a white one to transform her into a girl and a black one to restore her to avian form. Bati Chere, or Jema, lives as the prince's wife, but alternates forms, becoming human at night and a bird during the day. One day, the prince grabs Jema's human hand, and she goes to use the black bead to turn into a bird and flee, but she accidentally breaks it, keeping her human forever. Bati Chere/Jema goes to thank Lord Shiva for his blessing, but asks the deity why she does not have siblings. Shiva then blesses the three co-queens with pregnancies and they give birth. The prince brings Jema back to the king's palace, called Godlehenten, and the queens treat the now human bird, Jema, with affection.

=== Male children ===
Author Cecil Henry Bompas collected a tale titled The Sham Child, in Santal Parganas. In this tale, a raja has two Ranis and each queen has a maidservant who is also the raja's concubine. Despite this, the king has sired no heir. The ladies begin to quarrel, and the king banishes the elder queen to a palm leaf hut outside the palace and on the edge of town. The elder Rani's loyal maidservant joins her and they beg for a living. Sometime later, the first Rani's maidservant decides to play a trick on the king: she returns to the palace to inform the elder queen is expecting and has to beg for a living, so the king provides her with food and other provisions. After a while, the maidservant returns to report the queen bore a son to him, so the monarch allows her to take more provisions for them. This goes on for some time, which elevates the economic conditions of both woman. To further the deception, the maidservant asks the monarch to bring some anklets with bells to trick the king there is a boy running about in the elder queen's palace, when in actuality the maidservant tells the rani to rattle the bells. Eventually, the king arranges his false son's wedding, and neither the king nor the bride's friends come to see the bridegroom. The rani fears for the ruse to be discovered, but the maidservant assuages her fears and asks her to make a paste of mowah flowers and fashion the image of a child. The false image is placed in a palki and the marriage retinue departs, with the maidservant going in another palki. The retinue stop to rest near a bazar where a shrine to a saint is located. The maidservant goes to the shrine and calls on the spirit (bonga) that lives there, asking for a boon: she lies that she was carrying her son to his marriage, when he was transformed into paste, so the spirit needs to grant her another child, lest she spits and curses him. The spirit gives her a male child from somewhere, for which the maidservant is thankful and places the boy in the palki. The boy marries the bride, and the maidservant sends two men to warn the elder rani of the events and for her to prepare a feast. The Raja leaves the second rani's palace and goes to live with the elder one, whom he despised earlier. The tale has been compared to Shovona Devi's The Wax Prince and Kashmiri tale The Cat Who Became a Queen.

In a tale collected from a source named Bhagwati Pandey in Kanpur City with the title The Childless King, a childless king is mocked by a sweeper woman about his lack of heirs and suffers for this, so he lies in bed more than usual. The maidservant notices the king's tardiness and questions him, and the monarch reveals his grief. The maidservant then says that the king's worries will soon end, for the queen is pregnant and will bear him a son. After nine months, the maidservant tells the king that the queen has born a son, but the boy must not be seen until the chaṭhī rite. The maidservant keeps delaying the king's meeting his son through every ritual and ceremony (barahoň, pasanī, munḍan), until the janeū ceremony, wherein the maidservant tells the king mother and son must be behind a curtain near the altar. After the ceremony, the maidservant tells the prince must only be seen after the wedding. Marriage envoys come to see the prince, but the king says they can only see his turban and his sword. After a wedding is arranged with the prince, the bridegroom's marriage retinue is ready to visit the future bride. The queen fears the she and the maidservant will be killed, but the maidservant fashions an image of a child with sesame seeds, ghi and guḍ, places it in the palanquin and departs with them. On the road, the maidservant insists the party stop to rest near the temple of goddess Sakaṭh, and the palanquin be placed inside. It happens thus, but the smell of sesame, ghi and gud from the statue whets goddess Sakath's appetite, who swallows the image in a gulp. The maidservant discovers this and scolds the deity, asking her to provide a boy for her, lest she exposes her as a gluttonous goddess. The seven sisters (Note: According to the collector, goddess Sakath is supposed to be seven sisters in one body.) blame one another for eating the image, but give the maidservant a boy of twelve donning wedding clothes. The maidservant the bids the king see his son; the monarch sees the boy and faints at his beauty, then comes to and comments with the maidservant that he now understands why she hid him all this time. The marriage rites are done between the boy and his bride, and the marriage retinue returns home. The maidservant departs ahead to prepare the queen to meet her son, and tells the whole story. The queen finally meets her son, bows before the maidservant and performs the parachan. The tale was also classified as type 459, "The Make-Believe Son (Daughter)".

== See also ==
- Khirer Putul
- The Wax Prince
