= Vikas Dubey =

Indian history-sheeter and gangster (died 2020)

- Vikas Dubey
- Born: 26 December 1964; Bikroo village, Kanpur Nagar, Uttar Pradesh, India
- Died: 10 July 2020 (aged 55); Sachendi, Kanpur, Uttar Pradesh, India
- Cause of death: Gunshot wounds
- Other name: Vikas Pandit
- Status: Killed in encounter
- Criminal charges: Murder, robbery, kidnapping, illegal land acquisition, criminal intimidation

Vikas Dubey (26 December 1964 – 10 July 2020) was a notorious Indian gangster-turned-politician, crime boss, mobster and history-sheeter from Kanpur, Uttar Pradesh particularly infamous for the Bikroo case in July 2020. He was commonly known as "Vikas Pandit", naming himself after the titular character of the 1999 film Arjun Pandit, played by Sunny Deol. He was also alternatively referred to as "Pandit Ji" locally.

Prosecutors began the first criminal case against him in the early 1990s. By 2020, Dubey had over 60 criminal cases filed against him. He was connected to the murder of a minister of state, and in another incident, was the main accused in killing eight policemen during an attempted arrest. Uttar Pradesh Police declared him an absconder with a bounty of ₹500,000 on him, and he was arrested on 9 July 2020, in Ujjain, Madhya Pradesh. He was killed on 10 July 2020, in an encounter, after the police vehicle carrying him met with an accident. Media reports state that because of his political connections, Dubey had been acquitted for most of his murders, despite the presence of multiple witnesses at the scenes. Following his death, a judicial commission led by a retired Supreme Court judge, B. S. Chauhan, was initiated to probe Dubey's death and how he managed bail, among other things.

== Early life ==
Dubey was born to a Brahmin landlord family in Bikroo village in Kanpur Nagar district, Uttar Pradesh. From a young age, he formed a local gang and was responsible for criminal activities, including land grabbing and murder. He often targeted people for land grabbing if he perceived them to be easy targets. Dubey soon became one of the most wanted criminals in Kanpur. The first case lodged against him, in 1990, was for murder. Soon, he was associated as a close ally of Harikishan Srivastava, a local politician. Srivastava was then a part of the Bharatiya Janata Party (BJP) but joined the Bahujan Samaj Party (BSP) in the mid-1990s. Dubey also joined the BSP in 1995-96 and won elections at the district level, allegedly by employing muscle power. His wife, Richa Dubey also won elections of local bodies. Dubey was the primary accused in the 2001 killing of BJP leader Santosh Shukla, who was then a minister of state. He was arrested but was later discharged, allegedly due to his political influence.

== July 2020 encounter ==
On 3 July 2020, during an attempt to arrest Dubey and his men, eight policemen were killed, including a deputy superintendent of police (DSP), while seven police personnel were left injured. Two gunmen, identified as a maternal uncle and another close relative of Dubey, were also killed in the gunfight. The deceased were identified as DSP Devendra Mishra, Mahesh Yadav, Anoop Kumar Singh, Sultan Singh among others. The autopsy report revealed that the deceased were brutalized with an axe, along with multiple bullet wounds which were fired from different weapons, suggesting an ambush. The police later recovered weapons, including an AK-47 and an INSAS rifle, among others. The inspector general (IG) of Kanpur said that at least 60 men had ambushed the police team, who were 30 in number. Call records showed that Dubey was in contact with multiple police personnel, who leaked information to him. Following this, the Kanpur administration demolished his house with a bulldozer, and 25 police teams were then formed to arrest Dubey and his other associates.

== Arrest and death ==
Dubey was arrested in 2017; when the Government of Uttar Pradesh charged him under the Gangsters Act and Anti-Social Activities (Prevention) Act and charge-sheeted him in 2019. He challenged this at the High Court and secured an order of no coercive action against him.

He was apprehended again on 9 July 2020, near the Mahakaleshwar Jyotirlinga temple in Ujjain, Madhya Pradesh. He was reported to have shouted his name while being arrested, in fear of being killed like his accomplices. A petition was filed in the Supreme Court that same night which requested police protection for him and a thorough CBI investigation of his crimes.

On 10 July, the police vehicle carrying Dubey was involved in a road accident and overturned. The real cause of the accident remains unclear. Dubey allegedly snatched a pistol from a policeman trying to fix a flat tire and tried to run away, before being killed by the Uttar Pradesh Police.

== Post-death investigation ==
Following Dubey's death, an investigation led by retired Supreme Court judge B. S. Chauhan was initiated to look into 2 July encounter. People in gangster Dubey's circle, his state connections, and how he managed to get bail was investigated. The judicial commission also included judge Shashi Kant Agarwal and Indian Police Service (IPS) officer K. L. Gupta. The Justice B S Chauhan inquiry commission found no evidence of wrongdoing by Uttar Pradesh Police in the encounter killings of gangster Dubey and his five associates.

== Bikroo Kanpur Gangster ==
A film has also been produced on gangster Vikas Dubey named Bikroo Kanpur Gangster. The film is written and directed by Neeraj Singh and Shraddha Srivastava. During a press conference, the film's director Neeraj Singh had said that he had to shoot the film in Kanpur but later he was disallowed to shoot it further. Neeraj Singh had also stated at the press conference that he had received many threatening calls.
