= P. V. Kunhikrishnan =

Indian judge of Kerala High Court

Justice P. V. Kunhikrishnan
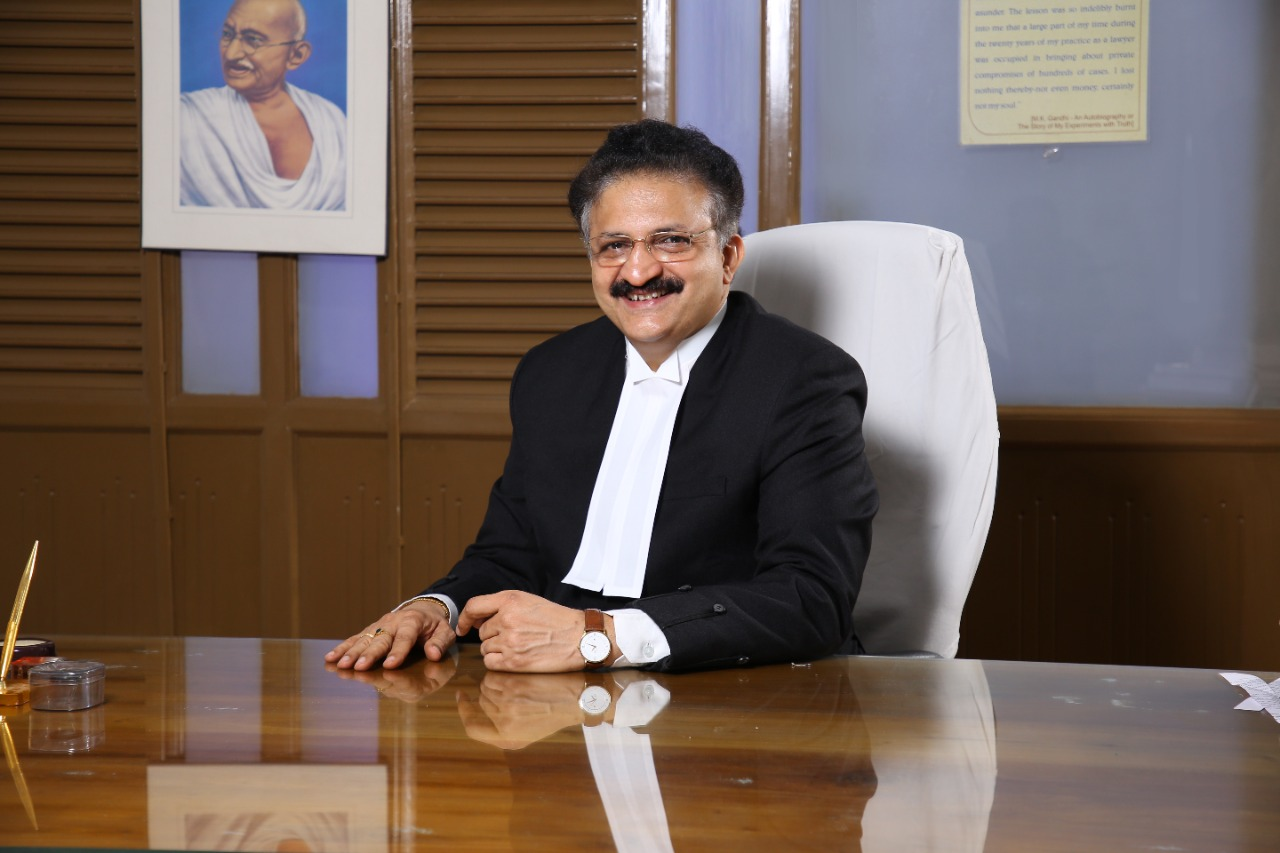

Judge of Kerala High Court
- Incumbent
- Assumed office 13 February 2020
- Nominated by: Ranjan Gogoi
- Appointed by: Ram Nath Kovind

Personal details
- Born: 22 May 1967 (age 59) Payyanur, Kannur, Kerala, India,
- Parents: Unnikrishnan Namboothiri; Leela Antharjanam
- Relatives: Kaithapram Damodaran Namboothiri (Brother-in-law)
- Education: The Kerala Law Academy Law College, Thiruvananthapuram
- Website: High Court of Kerala

Pulleri Vadhyarillathu Kunhikrishnan (born 22 May 1967) is a judge of Kerala High Court.

== Early life and education ==
Kunhikrishnan is the younger son of Malayalam actor Unnikrishnan Namboothiri and Leela Antharjanam. His siblings are Devi (Wife of the noted lyricist and musician Kaithapram Damodaran Namboothiri), Bhavadasan and Yamuna. Kunhikrishnan completed his schooling from Korom Devisahayam U.P. School and Government High School, Korom, Payyannur and obtained a law degree from The Kerala Law Academy Law College, Thiruvananthapuram in 1989.

== Career ==
Kunhikrishnan enrolled as an Advocate in 1989, started his practice at District and Sessions Court, Kozhikode in 1990 and shifted his practice to Kerala High Court, Ernakulam in 1993. During his practice, he served as standing counsel for Kerala State Electricity Board, Travancore Devaswom Board, Kozhikode Corporation etc.

== Appointment ==
Supreme Court collegium recommended his name as Judge in 2018, however the Ministry of Law and Justice returned the recommendation for reconsideration and thereafter in 2019 Supreme Court collegium reiterated its recommendation.

On 10 February 2020, he was appointed as additional judge of Kerala High Court by the Ministry of Law and Justice and he sworn-in as the Additional Judge of the High Court of Kerala on 13 February 2020.
