= Dum Kaata =

Dumkata
- Movie poster
- Directed by: Amol Palekar
- Written by: Sandhya Gokhale
- Starring: Sachin Khedekar; Om Puri
- Cinematography: Asim Bose
- Edited by: Amitabh Shukla
- Music by: Shankar–Ehsaan–Loy
- Release date: 9 November 2007
- Running time: 94 minutes
- Country: India
- Language: Hindi

Dum Kaata (transl. A Tale of a Tail!) is a Hindi-language comedy film directed by Amol Palekar and released in 2007. The film stars Om Puri, Anjana Basu, and Sachin Khedekar in the lead roles. The film also includes supporting roles played by Shernaz Patel and Aseen Desai. The film was released in India and in the UK in 2007 and released worldwide in 2010.

== Plot ==
The film focuses on Saumil, a young boy diagnosed with a medical condition for which surgical intervention is advised. Saumil, however, declines the recommended surgery. As the narrative progresses, Saumil's brother Kashul becomes increasingly convinced that Saumil is developing a tail. The film explores the family's dynamics and struggles as they deal with this complex situation, with Saumil's mother, father, and grandfather all playing significant roles.

Addressing themes of family, health, and the complexities of making difficult medical decisions, the film, while fictional, reflects real-life issues and challenges. The directors aim for a storytelling approach that is both emotionally engaging and thought-provoking, striving to maintain a neutral and objective tone throughout.

== Cast ==
- Om Puri
- Jainam Shah
- Viram Shah
- Anjana Basu
- Sachin Khedekar
- Shernaz Patel
- Heli Daruwala as Imlee
- Aseen Desai
- Viju Khote
- Vibhavari Deshpande as Ananya's mother
- Saloni Daini as Gauri
