= N Anand Venkatesh =

Judge of the Madras High Court, India

The Honourable Justice of Madras High Court Justice N Anand Venkatesh

Judge of Madras High Court
- Incumbent
- Assumed office 13 February 2020
- Nominated by: Amreshwar Pratap Sahi, Chief Justice of Madras High Court
- Appointed by: President Ram Nath Kovind

Additional Judge of Madras High Court
- In office 4 June 2018 – 12 February 2020
- Nominated by: S.K. Kaul, Chief Justice of Madras High Court
- Appointed by: Ram Nath Kovind, President of India

Personal details
- Born: 4 July 1969 (age 57)
- Parents: M. A. Nanda (father); Choodamani (mother)
- Education: Ambedkar Law College

Justice N Anand Venkatesh is a sitting judge of the Madras High Court.

== Early life ==
N Anand Venkatesh was born on 4 July 1969. He studied at St. Mary’s School at Perambur. He graduated with Bachelor of Commerce from A.M. Jain College, Meenambakkam and Bachelor of Law from Ambedkar Law college, Chennai.

== Judge of High Court ==
The Madras High Court Collegium headed by Chief Justice of the Madras High Court S.K. Kaul recommended the appointment of N Anand Venkatesh as an additional judge of Madras High Court on 19 December 2016. The recommendation was cleared by the Supreme Court Collegium in December 2017 and he was appointed on 4 June 2018.

In a meeting held on 12 February 2020, the Supreme Court Collegium headed by Chief Justice of India S.A. Bobde approved the appointment of N Anand Venkatesh as permanent judge of Madras High Court.

== Notable judgments ==
=== LGBTQ Rights ===
==== S Sushma v. Commissioner of Police ====
On 28 April 2021, Madras High Court Justice N Anand Venkatesh passed an interim order in response to a petition filed by two young women with same sex orientation. According to the order, in an unprecedented move, he decided to undergo psycho-education before penning a judgment on same sex relationships.

Ignorance is no justification for normalizing any form of discrimination

— Justice N Anand Venkatesh, 7th June 2021

Justice said that psyhco-educative counseling on queer issues helped him shed his personal ignorance and prejudices. He clearly stated in the judgment that the responsibility to change, the burden of unlearning stigma, and learning about the lived experience of the queer community lies on the society and not the queer individuals.

It was I (us), who has to set off on a journey of understanding them and accepting them and shed our notions, and not they who have to turn themselves inside out to suit our notions of social morality and tradition

— Justice N Anand Venkatesh, 7th June 2021

Justice recognized that there’s an absence of a specific law to protect the interests of queer people and acknowledged it is the responsibility of the constitutional courts to fill this vacuum with necessary directions to ensure the protection of such couples from harassment sourced from stigma and prejudices.

Till the legislature comes up with an enactment, the LGBTQIA+ community cannot be left in a vulnerable atmosphere where there is no guarantee for their protection and safety.

— Justice N Anand Venkatesh, 7th June 2021

On 7 June 2021, in an interim order on this case, Justice prohibited Conversion Therapy. He suggested comprehensive measures to sensitize the society and various branches of the State including the Police and judiciary to remove prejudices against the LGBTQIA+ community. He suggested that changes be made to the curricula of schools and universities to educate students on understanding the LGBTQIA+ community.

This Court is unable to understand the need for such a knee-jerk reaction within hours of the material getting uploaded on the website. If someone really had a grievance, the same should have been addressed in a proper manner through proper consultation and meetings, and no one can be allowed to arm-twist a State-run council into forcibly withdrawing a material that came out after a long study by a committee.

— Justice N Anand Venkatesh

The publication of the report titled 'Inclusion of Transgender Children in School Education: Concerns and Roadmap' was swiftly retracted due to external pressure shortly after its release.The report was originally designed as educational material for educators in schools. However, following complaints from specific groups, the National Commission for Protection of Child Rights (NCPCR) sent a notice to the National Council of Educational Research and Training (NCERT), prompting the removal of the manual from the website.

Justice emphasized the importance of creating awareness and understanding about transgender children and those with binary identities, stating that schools and families should play a crucial role in this process. Justice recognized that without support from their families, children within the transgender community may struggle to find support elsewhere. Justice asserted that opposition from a few individuals or groups that are hesitant to acknowledge the LGBTQIA+ Community should not disregard the report produced by an expert body. Justice directed the NCERT to submit its report on the issue before the court on 23 December.
