= B. S. Chauhan =

Indian judge (born 1949)

Judge of the Supreme Court of India
- In office 11 May 2009 – 1 July 2014

22nd Chief Justice of the Odisha High Court
- In office 16 July 2008 – 10 May 2009
- Preceded by: Asok Kumar Ganguly
- Succeeded by: Bilal Nazki

Personal details
- Born: Balbir Singh Chauhan; 2 July 1949 (age 77)
- Education: Meerut University; Banaras Hindu University

Balbir Singh Chauhan (born 2 July 1949) is the chairperson of Cauvery water dispute tribunal and the chairman of the 21st Law Commission of India. He was a judge of the Supreme Court of India from May 2009 to July 2014. He previously served as the Chief Justice of Orissa High Court from July 2008 to May 2009.

In July 2020, he was appointed to lead a judicial commission that would look into the Vikas Dubey case.
