= Legal Services Authorities =

Legal Services Authorities are statutory bodies constituted in the states of India by the Legal Services Authorities Act 1987, as enshrined by article 39-A of the Constitution of India, for providing free legal services for the citizens. These authorities give free legal aid to a person if he/she is not capable of bearing the expenditure. This includes appointing a lawyer in case the person is a defendant in a case. These authorities periodically organize 'lok-adalats' (Hindi for Public Court) for out-of-the-court settlement of the cases (under provision of the law). There are two types of lok adalats i.e Permanent Lok Adalat (public utility services), and non permanent lok adalat (simply known as Lok Adalat).
