= Poonam Rani v. State of Uttar Pradesh =

Indian LGBT Rights Case Law

- Court: Allahabad High Court
- Full case name: Poonam Rani & Anr. vs State of Uttar Pradesh & Ors.
- Decided: 20 January 2021
- Citation: Writ-C No. 1213 of 2021

Court membership
- Judges sitting: Mahesh Chandra Tripathi J., Sanjay Kumar Pachori J.

Case opinions
- The Constitutional Court, is duty-bound to monitor and observe Constitutional morality, as well as the rights of citizens that are under threat solely due to sexual orientation.
- Decision by: Mahesh Chandra Tripathi J., Sanjay Kumar Pachori J.

Keywords
- Cohabitation Rights, Queer Relationships

Poonam Rani & Anr. v. State Of Affairs & Ors. (2021) a decision of the Allahabad High Court, reaffirmed that the Constitutional Court bears the responsibility of overseeing and upholding both constitutional morality and the rights of citizens, particularly when these rights are endangered solely due to their sexual orientation.

== Background ==
Poonam Rani and her same-sex partner have been living together for several years, but their relationship has faced resistance from their respective families, who have used threats to intimidate the couple They claimed that their relationship is facing resistance from the family members and the immediate society. Consequently, the couple fear potential harassment and threats that could jeopardize their safety and ability to enjoy their same-sex relationship and filed a writ petition for protection order.

== Opinion of the Court ==
The Bench, guided by the Supreme Court's precedent in Navtej Singh Johar v. Union of India (2018), noted that sexual orientation constitutes an inherent aspect of the constitutional rights to liberty, dignity, privacy, personal autonomy, and equality. The Bench further observed that the state bears both negative and positive obligations with regard to sexual orientation, encompassing not only refraining from discrimination but also recognizing and upholding rights that contribute to authentic well-being within same-sex relationships.

Acknowledging the precedent set by the Supreme Court in Navtej Singh Johar v. Union of India (2018), the Bench highlighted that individuals belonging to the queer community possess the same constitutional rights as all other citizens, encompassing protected liberties and equal citizenship, devoid of discrimination, and ensuring equal protection under the law. The Bench further noted that the freedom to select a partner, the capacity to derive satisfaction from intimate relationships, and the entitlement to be free from discriminatory conduct are inherent aspects of the constitutional protection of sexual orientation.

Moreover, the Bench reiterated the precedent set by the Allahabad High Court in the case of Sultana Mirza v. State of Uttar Pradesh (2020).

This Court, being a Constitutional Court, is duty bound to monitor and observe Constitutional morality, as well as the rights of citizens that are under threat only on account of sexual orientation.

— Poonam Rani v. State of Uttar Pradesh, pp. 2 of 3

The Bench issued a directive to the Senior Superintendent of Police in Saharanpur, instructing them to furnish essential protection and ensure the prevention of any form of harassment against the couple.

== Related Cases ==
=== High Court Cases ===
==== Sultana Mirza v. State of Uttar Pradesh ====
In the preceding case of Sultana Mirza v. State of Uttar Pradesh (2020), a same-sex couple residing together, approached the Allahabad High Court seeking protection against threat to their life and liberty by family members and the immediate society. Poonam Rani v. State of Uttar Pradesh takes an additional stride by overtly asserting that these individuals hold equivalent constitutional rights as all citizens, safeguarding them against discrimination and unequal treatment, and underscoring the importance of the freedom to select a partner and partake in intimate relationships, regardless of their sexual orientation; however, in contrast to Sultana Mirza v. State of Uttar Pradesh, the judgment in Poonam Rani v. State of Uttar Pradesh lacks a comprehensive consideration of Constitutional morality.

In the case of Sultana Mirza v. State of Uttar Pradesh, the bench drew upon the insights of the Supreme Court in Navtej Singh Johar v. Union of India (2018), regarding Constitutional morality. Constitutional morality mandates that citizens should be well-acquainted with and supportive of the fundamental values of the Constitution, which include liberty, equality, and fraternity, as these ethical principles underpin the overarching goals of the Constitution. It is of paramount importance to acknowledge that the integration of constitutional morality occurs progressively and may continue over time in a society, and in order to foster this advancement, constitutional courts are entrusted with the responsibility of acting as external facilitators. The duty of the constitutional courts encompasses the oversight of upholding constitutional morality, a role essential for fostering an environment that supports the advancement of human dignity and liberty.

== See also ==
- LGBT rights in India
- S Sushma v. Commissioner of Police (2021)
- Sultana Mirza v. State of Uttar Pradesh (2020)
- Navtej Singh Johar v. Union of India (2018)
