= Sultana Mirza v. State of Uttar Pradesh =

Indian LGBT Rights Case Law

- Court: Allahabad High Court
- Full case name: Sultana Mirza & Anr. vs State of Uttar Pradesh & Ors.
- Decided: 2 November 2020
- Citation: Writ-C No. 17394 of 2020

Court membership
- Judges sitting: Shashi Kant Gupta J., Pankaj Bhatia J.

Case opinions
- The Constitutional Court, is duty-bound to monitor and observe Constitutional morality, as well as the rights of citizens that are under threat solely due to sexual orientation.
- Decision by: Shashi Kant Gupta J., Pankaj Bhatia J.

Keywords
- Cohabitation Rights, Queer Relationships

Sultana Mirza & Anr. v. State Of Uttar Pradesh & Ors. (2020), a decision of the Allahabad High Court, established that the Constitutional Court bears the responsibility of overseeing and upholding both constitutional morality and the rights of citizens, particularly when these rights are endangered solely due to their sexual orientation.

The Supreme Court of India acknowledged this case in its publication titled "Sensitisation Module for the Judiciary on LGBTIQA+ Community" as one of the High Court judgments that effectively addressed the difficulties and obstacles experienced by queer individuals within the justice system due to their systemic marginalization.

== Background ==
Sultana Mirza and her same-sex romantic partner have cohabited for several years, but their relationship has encountered opposition from both their family members and the broader community. Consequently, the couple fear potential harassment and threats that could jeopardize their safety and ability to enjoy their same-sex relationship and filed a writ petition for protection order.

== Opinion of the Court ==
The Bench, guided by the Supreme Court's precedent in Navtej Singh Johar v. Union of India (2018), noted that sexual orientation constitutes an inherent aspect of the constitutional rights to liberty, dignity, privacy, personal autonomy, and equality. The bench further observed that the state bears both negative and positive obligations with regard to sexual orientation, encompassing not only refraining from discrimination but also recognizing and upholding rights that contribute to authentic well-being within same-sex relationships.

Moreover, the bench drew upon the insights of the Supreme Court in Navtej Singh Johar v. Union of India (2018), regarding Constitutional morality. Constitutional morality mandates that citizens should be well-acquainted with and supportive of the fundamental values of the Constitution, which include liberty, equality, and fraternity, as these ethical principles underpin the overarching goals of the Constitution. It is of paramount importance to acknowledge that the integration of constitutional morality occurs progressively and may continue over time in a society, and in order to foster this advancement, constitutional courts are entrusted with the responsibility of acting as external facilitators. The duty of the constitutional courts encompasses the oversight of upholding constitutional morality, a role essential for fostering an environment that supports the advancement of human dignity and liberty.

This Court, being a Constitutional Court, is duty bound to monitor and observe Constitutional morality, as well as the rights of citizens that are under threat only on account of sexual orientation.

— Sultana Mirza v. State of Uttar Pradesh, pp. 4 of 5

The Bench issued a directive to the Senior Superintendent of Police in Shamli, instructing them to furnish essential protection and ensure the prevention of any form of harassment against the couple.

== Impact ==
The Supreme Court of India acknowledged this case in its publication titled "Sensitisation Module for the Judiciary on LGBTIQA+ Community" as one of the High Court judgments that effectively addressed the difficulties and obstacles experienced by queer individuals within the justice system due to their systemic marginalization.

== Related Cases ==
=== High Court Cases ===
This section delves into relevant cases from the High Courts of India. It's important to note that judgments rendered by one High Court do not hold mandatory authority over another, but they can still be regarded as influential precedents.

==== Poonam Rani v. State of Uttar Pradesh ====
In the related case of Poonam Rani v. State of Uttar Pradesh (2021), a same-sex couple residing together, approached the Allahabad High Court seeking protection against threat to their life and liberty by family members and the immediate society. In contrast to the Sultana Mirza v. State of Uttar Pradesh, the verdict in Poonam Rani v. State of Uttar Pradesh explicitly highlight the entitlement of queer individuals in relationships to equal citizenship and protection under the law and reinforced the principle of non-discrimination.

A two-judge Bench of the Allahabad High Court, invoked the Supreme Court precedent set by Navtej Singh Johar v. Union of India (2018), highlighted that individuals belonging to the queer community possess the same constitutional rights as all other citizens, encompassing protected liberties and equal citizenship, devoid of discrimination, and ensuring equal protection under the law. The Bench further noted that the freedom to select a partner, the capacity to derive satisfaction from intimate relationships, and the entitlement to be free from discriminatory conduct are inherent aspects of the constitutional protection of sexual orientation.

== See also ==
- LGBT rights in India
- Poonam Rani v. State of Uttar Pradesh (2021)
- Chinmayee Jena v. State of Odisha (2020)
- Navtej Singh Johar v. Union of India (2018)
