= S. Sushma v. Commissioner of Police =

Indian LGBT Rights Case Law

S Sushma v. Commissioner of Police
- Court: Madras High Court
- Full case name: S Sushma & Anr. versus Commissioner of Police & Ors.
- Decided: TBA
- Citations: W.P. No. 7284 of 2021: 7 June 2021; 31 August 2021; 4 October 2021; 6 December 2021; 23 December 2021; 2 September 2022

Court membership
- Judge sitting: N Anand Venkatesh, J.

Case opinions
- Practice of "conversion therapy" by medical professionals is prohibited in India.; Harassment against the queer community and community workers by police is prohibited in Tamil Nadu.
- Decision by: N Anand Venkatesh J.

Keywords
- Cohabitation Rights, Queer Relationships, Conversion Therapy, Police Misconduct

S Sushma & Anr. versus Commissioner of Police & Ors. (2021) is a landmark decision of the Madras High Court that prohibited the practice of "conversion therapy" by medical professionals in India. The court directed comprehensive measures to sensitize the society and various branches of the Union and State governments to remove prejudices against the queer community.

== Background ==
The petitioners, a lesbian couple whose parents opposed their relationship, sought refuge in Chennai after leaving their respective homes in Madurai. With the assistance of Non-Governmental Organisation (NGO) and members of the queer community, they were able to secure accommodation and protection, while also searching for employment to sustain themselves financially. In the meantime, their parents separately filed missing person complaints with the local police, resulting in the registration of two First Information Reports (FIRs). Due to police interrogation conducted at their homes and fearing for their safety, the couple approached the court, through their counsel S. Manuraj, seeking a directive to the police to refrain from harassing them and to ensure protection against any threats or dangers posed by their parents.

== Proceedings ==
The court mandated that both the petitioners and their parents undergo counseling with psychologist Ms. Vidya Dinakaran.

Following the initial counseling session, the psychologist submitted a report on 28 April 2021. The report indicated that the petitioners possessed a clear understanding of their relationship and exhibited no doubts or confusion. It further stated that the petitioners expressed their desire to pursue education, work, and maintain communication with their parents. However, they expressed concerns that their parents might currently pressure them to separate, but they were willing to wait for their parents to comprehend their relationship.

Regarding the parents, the psychologist's report revealed their primary concerns about societal stigma attached to the relationship and the potential consequences for their family. The report also highlighted the parents' anxieties about their daughters' safety and security. According to the report, the parents preferred their daughters to live celibate lives, viewing it as a more dignified option compared to being in a same-sex partnership. Additionally, the parents expressed confusion regarding matters such as lineage, adoption, and other typical aspects associated with heterosexual relationships, and how those would apply in the context of a same-sex relationship.

The petitioners' counsel S. Manuraj appealed to the court to establish guidelines for cases of a similar nature. In an unprecedented step, in response to this request, Justice N Anand Venkatesh made the decision to undergo psycho-education before delivering a judgment on same-sex relationships. Justice approached psychologist Ms Vidya Dinakaran, seeking an appointment to gain a better understanding of these relationships and facilitate his personal growth in this regard. Following this, he interacted with members of the LGBTQIA+ community, including doctors, NGO representatives and activists, to gain a deeper understanding of the issues affecting the community. In these consultations he was made aware of the various forms of discrimination, harassment and violence facing LGBTQIA+ community members and gender-nonconforming children in families, schools, colleges, workplaces, healthcare establishments and from law-enforcement.

== Opinion of the Court ==
On 7 June 2021, the court issued a directive to the Union Government of India and State Government of Tamil Nadu, instructing them to collaborate with other Ministries and Departments in formulating measures and policies aimed at eradicating prejudices against the queer community and facilitating their integration into mainstream society. The court recommended comprehensive actions to sensitize society, as well as the different branches of the Union and State governments, including the police and judiciary, with the objective of eliminating biases against the queer community. The court further proposed revising school and university curricula to ensure that students gain a better understanding of the queer community.

Ignorance is no justification for normalizing any form of discrimination.

— Justice N Anand Venkatesh, 7th June 2021

Justice N Anand Venkatesh emphasized the positive impact of psycho-educative counseling in addressing his personal ignorance and prejudices concerning queer issues. In the judgment, he explicitly stated that the responsibility for change, the burden of unlearning stigma, and the task of understanding the lived experiences of the queer community rests with society rather than solely with queer individuals.

It was I [us], who has to set off on a journey of understanding them and accepting them and shed our notions, and not they who have to turn themselves inside out to suit our notions of social morality and tradition.

— Justice N Anand Venkatesh, 7th June 2021

The court acknowledged the lack of a specific law safeguarding the rights of queer individuals and recognized that it is the duty of the constitutional courts to address this gap by providing appropriate directives. These directions are essential to ensure the protection of queer couples from harassment stemming from stigma and prejudices.

Till the legislature comes up with an enactment, the LGBTQIA+ community cannot be left in a vulnerable atmosphere where there is no guarantee for their protection and safety.

— Justice N Anand Venkatesh, 7th June 2021

On 6 December 2021, following sudden removal of the Action Plan devised by the National Council of Educational Research and Training (NCERT) for the purpose of sensitizing school teachers to matters concerning gender non-conforming children, the court underscored the importance of expert opinions and research. The court staunchly advocated democratic principles, highlighting the pivotal role played by open discussions and well-informed consultations in the formulation of policies.The court cautioned against succumbing to pressure tactics that could erode the foundation of sound policy-making. It accentuated the potential harm that such practices could inflict upon the nation's integrity.

The report of an expert body after a detailed study cannot be dumped just because a handful of persons are opposed to this very idea of recognising persons belonging to the [Queer] Community. In a democratic country like India, discussions and consultations must form the basis for any policy and pressure tactics cannot be allowed to shut down any policy, and if such an attitude is encouraged, it poses a greater danger to the fabric of this nation.

— Justice N Anand Venkatesh, 6th December 2021

== Compliance ==
=== Law Enforcement Agencies ===
==== Police Conduct Rules ====
On 29 January 2022, the State Government of Tamil Nadu introduced an amendment to the Tamil Nadu Subordinate Police Officers' Conduct Rules of 1964 by incorporating Rule 24-C.

No police officer shall indulge in any act of harassment of any person belonging to the LGBTQIA (Lesbian, Gay, Bisexual, Transgender, Queer, Intersex, Asexual) + Community and the persons working for the welfare of the said community.

— Rule 24-C, Tamil Nadu Subordinate Police Officers' Conduct Rules of 1964

The revised conduct rules were officially published in the gazette on 17 February 2022. The accompanying order clarifies that "harassment," as referred to in this rule, excludes the right of the police to conduct inquiries in accordance with established legal procedures. This landmark amendment makes Tamil Nadu the first state in India to hold law enforcement accountable for harassing the queer community.

=== Physical and Mental Health ===
==== Medical Education ====
On 24 September 2021, the Undergraduate Medical Education Board of the National Medical Commission established an Expert Committee to tackle matters concerning the queer community within the MBBS course curriculum, as well as the subject of Virginity Tests in Forensic Medicine.

On 13 October 2021, National Medical Commission issued an advisory acknowledging that several medical education textbooks, primarily in Forensic Medicine, Toxicology, and Psychiatry, contain unscientific information about virginity and also feature derogatory remarks against the queer community. Subsequently, the National Medical Commission urged all Medical Education Institutions to revise their teaching methodologies for both undergraduate and postgraduate students, ensuring that when addressing gender-related topics, clinical history, symptoms, and examination findings are presented devoid of any potential for derogatory, discriminatory, or offensive implications towards the queer community. Moreover, authors of medical textbooks have been directed to amend content related to virginity and the queer community, ensuring alignment with scientifically credible literature, government guidelines, and court rulings. Additionally, Medical Education Institutions are advised against endorsing books as recommended textbooks if they contain unscientific, derogatory, or discriminatory content concerning virginity and the queer community.

==== Conversion Therapy ====
On 2 September 2022, National Medical Commission declared provision of conversion therapy as an act of professional misconduct. It empowered the State Medical Councils to take disciplinary action against medical professionals if they provide "conversion therapy".

=== Education ===
==== Awareness and Sensitization ====
On 6 September 2021, the National Council of Educational Research and Training (NCERT) released a teacher-training manual titled "Inclusion of Transgender Children in School Education: Concerns and Roadmap," delving into various concepts, including gender identity and fluidity, to foster an inclusive classroom environment where children from diverse gender backgrounds find both a place and acceptance.

After the release of the manual, an article about it was published by the Firstpost, leading to a mixed response of both appreciation and criticism on Twitter. In response to critique voiced on social media and a complaint lodged with the National Commission for Protection of Child Rights (NCPCR), the NCPCR sought clarification from the NCERT and urged them to take action to address perceived anomalies in the manual. However, the specific nature of these alleged "anomalies" remains uncertain, and prior to verifying the legitimacy of the complainant's concerns, the NCERT decided to remove the manual from its website due to the public outcry.

=== Language ===
==== Media Responsibility and Sensitivity ====
On 4 October 2021, the Additional Advocate General for State Government of Tamil Nadu highlighted that a prominent newspaper has taken progressive steps regarding media's role. They organized a seminar, resulting in a commitment to cultivate a queer-friendly environment. Efforts are underway to create style guide for language usage when discussing or reporting on queer community. This initiative extends to training editors and reporters in handling queer stories. The finalized style guide is anticipated to benefit all involved in news reporting, ensuring respectful treatment of queer community without derogatory language.

On 9 June 2023, the South Indian news platform "The News Minute" and the independent publishing house "Queer Chennai Chronicles" collaboratively launched a style guide, endorsed by the Google News Initiative, titled "Inqlusive Newsrooms LGBTQIA+ Media Reference Guide." This comprehensive style guide is currently undergoing translation into Tamil, Kannada, Telugu, Hindi, and Marathi languages.

== Subsequent Cases ==
=== XYZ v. State of Maharashtra ===
A division bench of the Bombay High Court, consisting of Justices Revati Mohite-Dere and Gauri Godse, presided over a plea filed by a lesbian couple.The couple sought directives from the authorities to secure suitable protection for one of them, while also requesting that no coercive measures be taken against the petitioner. During the proceedings, the bench referred to the guidelines established in the case of S Sushma v. Commissioner of Police, aimed at protecting same-sex couples from police harassment, and the directives within the same case for the State Government of Tamil Nadu to implement sensitization programs across different departments in the State.

== See also ==
- LGBT rights in India
- XYZ v. State of Maharashtra (2023)
- Poonam Rani v. State of Uttar Pradesh (2021)
- Navtej Singh Johar v. Union of India (2018)
