= Shivli =

Shivli Sheoli
- town
- Nickname: Shiv Ki Nagari
- Location in Uttar Pradesh, India
- Coordinates: 26°37′0″N 80°3′0″E
- Country: India
- State: Uttar Pradesh
- District: Kanpur Dehat
- Founder: The temple Sri Jageshwer was found by a village man
- Named for: Lord Shiva of Jageshwer temple

Government
  - Type: nagar panchayat
  - Body: Town area
  - Chairman: Awadhesh Kumar shukla

Population (2015)
  - Total: 13,852

Languages
  - Official: Hindi, English
- Time zone: UTC+5:30 (IST)
- Vehicle registration: UP-77-
- Nearest city: Kanpur

Shivli or Sheoli is a town and a nagar panchayat in Kanpur Dehat district in the Indian Indian state of Uttar Pradesh. It is at 26°37′0″N 80°3′0″E, 35 kilometers northwest of Kanpur, and has an average elevation of 128 meters (423 feet).

== Demographics ==
As of 2015 India census, Shivli had a population of 10000. Males constitute 53% of the population and females 47%. Shivli has an average literacy rate of 69%, higher than the national average of 59.5%: male literacy is 75%, and female literacy is 62%. In Shivli, 15% of the population is under 6 years of age.
