= Hyderabad Queer Pride =

LGBT event in Hyderabad, India

Hyderabad Queer Pride has been celebrated on one of the Sundays in February since 2013. First held on 3 February 2013, Hyderabad became the 12th Indian city to join the queer pride march bandwagon, fourteen years after the first Indian pride march was held in Kolkata. In 2015 it was renamed as Hyderabad Queer Swabhimana Pride, emphasising the self-respect and the acceptance of the community of themselves, as they are. In 2016 it was altered to Hyderabad Queer Swabhimana Yatra and has been retained since.

== Political difficulties ==
The march was originally to be held in 2012, however the organisers were denied permission by the police. Scheduled on 14 October 2012, the organisers had to cancel the march when police denied them permission stating that ‘there are too many marches these days’. Hyderabad is a conservative city in terms of culture and takes pride in its culture, which is highly influenced by the Nizams. The LGBTQI culture in Hyderabad is seen as a threat to the existing cultural fabric.

== 2013 ==
For the first time ever, Necklace Road was opened up for a cultural events. Named the Hyderabad Queer Pride 2013, the event was initiated by 42 organisations, consisting a mixture of LGBT support groups and NGOs like Suraksha as well as corporate groups like Facebook, Google, GE, Accenture and others. The participants were mostly youngsters marching from PV Narasimha Rao's Samadhi to the People's Plaza.

== 2014 ==
The second Hyderabad queer pride was held on 23 February 2014, flagged off by actress Lakshmi Manchu and ended at Shilpa Kala Vedika. There were difficulties with the march, which was stopped by the police 10 minutes after its start and resumed after proper documents were checked.

== 2015 ==
The third Hyderabad, and the first Telangana, queer pride was held on 8 February 2015. The march was renamed Queer Swabhimana Pride, where 'swabhimana' stands for self-respect. Mobilised by the Telangana Transgender and Hijra Association, the march drew its energy from the murder of Pravallika, a hijra sex worker with an MBA, the previous month, and saw attendance of transgender men and women from the working class. The march which was held from Gowshala in Kavadiguda to Indira Park, was steeped in cultural expressions of Telangana as Bathukamma and Pothuraju, which are part of Bonalu festivities, made their appearance in the event. The Dalit rights activist Kancha Ilaiah was also present and delivered a speech on the necessity of the Constitution to protect the rights of the citizens irrespective of their identities.

== 2016 ==
The fourth Hyderabad queer pride march renamed as the Queer Swabhimana Yatra, 2016 was held on 21 February 2016. The theme for the year was 'My Child, My Pride', thereby inviting the mothers of queer individuals to walk for the yatra. The walk was held from Dabeerapura Railway station to Khilawat ground.

== 2017 ==
The fifth Hyderabad Queer Swabhimana Yatra was held on 19 February 2017. The yatra started from Krishnakanth Park and ended at BK Guda Park. The march has presently become a major social event in the city's calendar.

== 2018 ==
Celebrated on 18 February, the sixth Hyderabad Queer Swabhimana Yatra was organised by Queer Campus, Hyderabad in association with various allied organisations and civil societies. The annual march traversed 4 kilometers from Kacheguda Railway Station to GHMC park, Amberpet to protest against the section 377 of the Indian Penal Code (IPC) which criminalizes sexual intercourse 'against the order of nature'. Over 50 police personnel helped more than 500 participants consisting of both, members from the LGBTQ+ community and allies to march through the city.

== 2019 ==
Hyderabad celebrated its 7th edition of the Queer Swabhimana Yatra on 10 March. Starting from Begumpet Police station, the parade marched on till Shenoy Grounds covering a 4 km walk. Over 300 members from the community, and several other allies, marched for equal rights, inclusion and dignity.

This was the first Pride Parade since homosexuality was decriminalized [Section 377 was held unconstitutional in September 2018]. At the Swabhimana Yatra, the LGBTQ+ community celebrated gender variance and sexual diversity. While the struggle for equality continues, the scars the LGBTQ+ community has faced are slowly healing, paving way to an open and inclusive society.

== 2022 ==
The parade was suspended for three years due to the COVID-19 pandemic. In 2022, it was announced that the next occurrence of the parade would take place on November 13, with predictions that about a thousand people would participate. Ultimately, 400 to 600 people participated in the walk, which was held that afternoon.

== 2024 ==
In February 2024, Hyderabad hosted its annual queer Pride Parade, with more than 1,000 participants marching from Divyasree NSL Orion near Raidurg Police Station to Shilparamam, carrying rainbow flags and placards calling for inclusion and diversity. Also in 2024, the Queer Swabhimana Yatra, in its ninth edition, saw hundreds of participants from diverse sexual orientations traverse a 4 km route from Gachibowli to Shilparamam. During the march, organisers presented ten key demands, including: A 2% horizontal reservation for transgender persons across OBC, Dalit, and Tribal categories, The establishment of short-stay homes for LGBTQIA+ individuals, And implementation of inclusive healthcare policies.

== 2025 ==
In June 2025, the Mobbera Foundation organised Queer Fiesta to mark ten years of Pride activities in Hyderabad. The event drew over 800 participants, making it one of the largest queer gatherings in the city. Alongside performances, it highlighted ongoing challenges faced by LGBTQ+ communities, including barriers in education and employment, and stressed the need for inclusion of non-binary and gender-nonconforming people in state policies. On 14 June 2025, Hyderabad hosted India’s first Interfaith Pride Fest at Bagh Bean Café, Jubilee Hills. Organised by Dragvanti, Rubaroo, Mobbera Foundation and other groups, the festival sought to create dialogue between queer identity and spirituality through performances, storytelling and discussion.

== See also ==
- LGBTQ rights in Telangana
