= Karnataka Sexual Minorities Forum v. State of Karnataka =

Indian LGBT Rights Case Law

- Court: Karnataka High Court
- Full case name: Karnataka Sexual Minorities Forum versus State of Karnataka & Ors.
- Decided: 6 February 2017
- Citation: 2017:KHC:3031-DB

Court membership
- Judges sitting: Subhro Kamal Mukherjee CJ. and Budihal R.B J.

Case opinions
- Since the provision that exhibited discriminatory targeting towards transgender individuals was revised to eliminate the term 'eunuchs,' the writ petition was resolved and dismissed.
- Decision by: Subhro Kamal Mukherjee CJ. and Budihal R.B J.

Keywords
- Criminal Stereotyping, Institutional Discrimination, Intersex Rights, Non-binary Gender Rights, Transgender Rights

Karnataka Sexual Minorities Forum versus State of Karnataka & Ors. (2017), a case of the Karnataka High Court, which resulted in an amendment of Section 36A of the Karnataka Police Act, which categorized the intersex, non-binary gender and transgender individuals as predisposed to criminal activity.

The replacement of the term 'eunuch' with 'persons' has garnered criticism for substantially broadening the possible applicability of the law, even as the oppressive structure of the law remains unchanged.

== Background ==
During British rule in India, intersex, non-binary gender and transgender individuals were referred to as 'eunuchs' in a stigmatizing manner. The British introduced discriminatory laws based on gender identity, including an 1897 amendment that added 'eunuchs' to the Criminal Tribes Act of 1873, an Act that presumed certain communities were predisposed to criminal activity. The amendment introduced a separate section for 'eunuchs', defining them as impotent males. They were mandated to register with local authorities and faced restrictions on acting as guardians for minors, executing gifts or wills, and adopting sons, with violations carrying the risk of imprisonment. They were prohibited from 'dressing like a woman' in public, engaging in dance, and partaking in public exhibitions.

While the Criminal Tribes Act was repealed in 1949, similar language persisted in other laws to control and surveil transgender individuals. The present case pertains to Section 36A of the Karnataka Police Act of 1963, which replaced the Hyderabad Eunuchs Act of 1329 Fasli, a 1919 act inherited from the former State of Hyderabad and remaining in effect in the Gulbarga Region of Karnataka. Section 36A grants the police commissioner the authority to curb 'undesirable activities of eunuchs' and permits the maintenance of a register detailing the names and residences of 'eunuchs' suspected of engaging in activities such as 'kidnapping and emasculating boys' or of committing 'unnatural offences' or abetting the commission of such offences.

The petitioners have contested the constitutionality of Section 36A of the Karnataka Police Act, asserting that it is in violation of Articles 14, 15, 19, and 21 of the Constitution.

== Proceedings ==
Relying on the precedent set by the case National Legal Services Authority v. Union of India (2014), wherein non-binary gender identities were legally recognized, and the fundamental rights of intersex, non-gender binary, and transgender individuals were upheld under Articles 14, 15, 19, and 21 of the Constitution, the Petitioners argue against the constitutionality of Section 36A of the Karnataka Police Act. They contend that this section contravenes Articles 14, 15, 19, and 21 of the Constitution.

The Counsel for the State Government of Karnataka stated the willingness of the State Government to amend Section 36A. On 12 January 2016, the Bench noted the stance of the State Government and granted the State Government a six-month period to present the amended section to the Court.

On 3 February 2017, the State Government's Counsel acknowledged that Section 36A discriminatorily targeted transgender individuals and submitted that the section has been amended to remove the term 'eunuchs.'

== Opinion of the Court ==
After the State Government of Karnataka informed that the disputed Section 36A of the Karnataka Police Act has been amended to eliminate the term 'eunuchs,' the Bench concluded the writ petition.

The interim order and the judgment of the Bench noticeably lack a comparative analysis of the challenged Section 36A with Sections 24 to 37 of the repealed Criminal Tribes Act of 1873. This omission holds particular significance, given that the binding precedent cited by the petitioners, National Legal Services Authority v. Union of India (2014), underscored the adverse impact of the Criminal Tribes Act on intersex, non-gender binary, and transgender individuals.

== Compliance ==
Section 36A of the Karnataka Police Act underwent an amendment through the Karnataka Police (Amendment) Act of 2016, wherein the term "eunuch" was replaced with "person". The Amendment Act received the Governor's assent on 26 July 2016 and was subsequently published in the Karnataka Gazette Extraordinary on 27 July 2016.

== Legal analysis ==
After the replacement of the term 'eunuch' with 'persons,' Section 36A of the Karnataka Police Act authorizes the police commissioner to take action against 'persons' involved in 'emasculating boys' and committing 'unnatural offenses,' an outcome that broadened the scope of application of provision while retaining the potential risks associated with its existence in the legal framework. Consequently, the move has attracted criticism from human rights lawyers specializing in transgender rights.

Jessica Bridgette Hinchy, a historian specializing in colonial governance and law, criticized the alteration of the term, asserting that the change has essentially expanded the potential applicability of the law. Ramya Jawahar, a Human Rights lawyer, highlighted that merely substituting the term 'eunuch' will not rectify the underlying problematic nature of Section 36A, which poses harm to the transgender community. She stated that the invocation of Section by the police will still disproportionately impact the transgender community, along with an even broader group of individuals. Gowthaman Ranganathan, a lawyer specializing in Human Rights and Comparative Constitutional Law, stated that he advocates for the full repeal of Section 36A, which essentially resembles an extension of the abolished Criminal Tribes Act of 1873. He noted that the revisions made are of a minor nature and anything less than a complete repeal remains entirely unacceptable because it constitutes a violation of transgender rights and the principle of equality.

Jayna Kothari and Diksha Sanyal acknowledged that the amendment merely creates a superficially neutral appearance for the provision, while retaining the oppressive framework of the law. Nevertheless, they view this as a significant milestone for transgender rights, marking the first instance of legislative amendment of a legal provision directed against sexual minorities in India.

== Related cases ==
=== High Court cases ===
This section delves into relevant cases from the High Courts of India. Judgments rendered by one High Court do not hold mandatory authority over another, but they can still be regarded as influential precedents.

==== Vyjayanti Vasanta Mogli v. State of Telangana ====
The subsequent case of Vyjayanti Vasanta Mogli v. State of Telangana (2023) in the Telangana High Court challenged the constitutionality of the Telangana Eunuchs Act of 1329 Fasli, a legislative provision akin to Section 36A of the Karnataka Police Act of 1963, which was contested in the case of Karnataka Sexual Minorities Forum v. State of Karnataka. Both provisions, Section 36A of the Karnataka Police Act and the Telangana Eunuchs Act, share a common historical foundation, language, and legal provisions, as their establishment is rooted in a shared approach that originated the British colonial-era Criminal Tribes Act of 1873. These provisions were enacted with the intent and purpose of enforcing control and surveillance over transgender individuals.

While the Karnataka High Court addressed and dismissed the case of Karnataka Sexual Minorities Forum v. State of Karnataka, following an amendment by the State Government of Karnataka that replaced the term 'eunuch' with 'persons,' the Telangana High Court invalidated the Telangana Eunuchs Act, for violating the fundamental rights guaranteed under Articles 14 and 21 of the Constitution of India.

The Telangana High Court conducted a comparative analysis and determined that the provisions of the Telangana Eunuchs Act are analogous to the provisions found in Sections 24 to 37 of the Criminal Tribes Act. The court observed that the Criminal Tribes Act, a notably oppressive colonial legislation, classified various tribal groups, including 'eunuchs', as criminal tribes, and subjected them to continuous surveillance and societal stigmatization as criminals. The court observed that while the Criminal Tribes Act has been repealed by the Union Government, the analogous Telangana Eunuchs Act had remained in effect until the court stayed its implementation on 18 September 2018.

The Telangana High Court, drawing on Supreme Court precedents such as National Legal Services Authority v. Union of India (2014), Puttaswamy v. Union of India (2017), and Navtej Singh Johar v. Union of India (2018), reached the conclusion that the Telangana Eunuchs Act, which categorized the entire 'eunuchs' community as predisposed to criminal activity, is not only arbitrary and unreasonable, but also manifestly arbitrary. As a result, the court invalidated the Telangana Eunuchs Act on the grounds that it infringes upon the principles of equality enshrined under Article 14, as well as the right to dignity and privacy guaranteed under Article 21.

It is significant to note that the Telangana High Court, in contrast to the Karnataka High Court, engaged in a comparative analysis of the disputed provisions alongside the British colonial-era Criminal Tribes Act, leading to the identification of their analogy and consequent invalidation of the contested provisions.

== See also ==
- LGBT rights in India
- Vyjayanti Vasanta Mogli v. State of Telangana (2023)
- Navtej Singh Johar v. Union of India (2018)
- Puttaswamy v. Union of India (2017)
- National Legal Services Authority v. Union of India (2014)
