= LGBTQ rights in Telangana =

- Telangana
- Legal status: Legal since 2018
- Gender identity: Third gender recognised; transgender people may change legal gender
- Discrimination protections: Anti-discrimination protections under Supreme Court rulings Navtej Singh Johar (2018) and NALSA (2014)

Family rights
- Recognition of relationships: No legal recognition of same-sex marriage in Telangana; live-in relationships allowed
- Adoption: No

LGBTQ rights in Telangana refer to the legal status, protections, challenges, and activism related to LGBTQ+ people in the Indian state of Telangana.

== Historical context ==
Historical reporting and scholarship describe the long presence of gender-variant communities in the Indian subcontinent, including the Deccan region. The Jogappas are a gender-variant community traditionally associated with the worship of the goddess Yellamma. The members -often male at birth—adopt feminine roles, are ritually married to the deity and follow specific customs such as the prohibition on castration Historical compilations such as Indian Antiquary also record eunuchs in Deccan polities, including named eunuch officers and attendants referenced in earlier sources relating to the region. The sixth Nizam of Hyderabad Mahboob Ali Pasha employed hijras as trusted confidantes and advisors. The Hyderabad State also had a dedicated Inspector for hijras in the Police Department for their welfare and to ensure they are not subjected to harassment. The foundation legend of the Maula Ali ka Pahad near Hyderabad, is also related to a eunuch in the court of Ibrahim Qutub Shah, the fourth ruler of the Sultanate of Golconda.

In the princely Hyderabad State, Andhra Pradesh (Telangana Area) Eunuchs Act was enacted in 1919 required the compulsory registration of eunuchs and imposed restrictions on their behaviour. This law functioned similarly to colonial systems such as the Criminal Tribes framework, creating a legacy of official surveillance and stigma for transgender people in the region.

The Telangana High Court finally struck down the surviving form of the 1919 law in 2023 in Vyjayanti Vasanta Mogli v. State of Telangana, holding that it violated constitutional rights and dignity.

== Recognition of relationships ==
Same-sex sexual activity has been legal in Telangana since 2018, following the Supreme Court ruling in Navtej Singh Johar v. Union of India. However, same-sex marriage is not legally recognised in Telangana, as Indian law does not currently provide for civil unions or marriage rights for same-sex couples.

In 2024, a habeas corpus petition involving a same-sex couple was filed before the Telangana High Court, in which a woman sought legal protection to live with her same-sex partner and argued for the right to choose her partner. The court ruled in favour of them stating "liberty to go with the person of her choice and stay at the place of her choice".

Despite the lack of legal recognition, private wedding ceremonies for same-sex couples have been held in Telangana. In 2021, Supriyo Chakraborty and Abhay Dang celebrated a wedding ceremony near Hyderabad, attended by family and friends and including cultural rituals such as vows, rings, mehendi, and sangeet.

== Discrimination protections ==
Telangana provides protections to LGBTQIA+ individuals primarily through national court rulings and state initiatives. The Supreme Court of India rulings in Navtej Singh Johar v. Union of India (2018) and National Legal Services Authority v. Union of India (2014) ensure that LGBTQ persons are protected from discrimination in employment, housing, and access to services, which apply in Telangana.

In July 2023, the Telangana High Court struck down the Telangana Eunuchs Act (1919) as unconstitutional in Vyjayanti Vasanta Mogli v. State of Telangana, observing that it violated the rights to equality, dignity, and privacy of transgender persons. The court directed the state government to extend welfare schemes and reservations to transgender individuals.

The Telangana Police have also initiated measures to protect LGBTQIA+ persons. The Pride Place Cell, under the Women Safety Wing, serves as a dedicated response mechanism for reporting harassment and violence against LGBTQIA+ individuals. In 2025, Telangana Police partnered with the NGO Yugantar to expand support services, including legal aid, crisis intervention, mental health support, police training, and public awareness campaigns.

The Telangana High Court has also directed authorities to accept recruitment applications from transgender persons, ensuring equal access to employment opportunities by including a “third-gender” option on official application portals.

State welfare initiatives have further contributed to anti-discrimination efforts, such as providing housing support to transgender traffic assistants in Hyderabad under the Indiramma scheme, promoting socio-economic inclusion and protection against marginalization.

== Societal attitudes ==
Members of the LGBTQIA+ community in Hyderabad have reported that legal recognition of relationships could help address social stigma and challenges faced in daily life. Many same-sex couples and transgender individuals experience discrimination and lack of societal acceptance, and that formal recognition of their relationships would "unknot many problems" in their personal and family lives.

Transgender individuals have increasingly engaged in civic participation, including registering as third-gender voters and advocating for visibility during elections. Activists have emphasized that this community must show its presence as a vote bank to improve social inclusion and reduce discrimination in Telangana.

According to the Open for Business City Ratings 2025 report, Hyderabad — along with cities such as Mumbai, Delhi, Bengaluru and Chennai — earned a “C” rating for LGBTQ+ inclusion, categorising it as partially open for business.

== Activism and community ==
The LGBTQIA+ community in Hyderabad actively organises events like the annual Queer Swabhimana Yatra (Hyderabad Queer Pride) and pride marches, with participation of hundreds of activists and community members. Hyderabad has also hosts Interfaith Pride Fest and Queer Indie Film and Literature Festival. The Telangana Police also partners with the NGO Yugantar to strengthen services through the Pride Place Transgender (LGBTQIA+) Persons Protection Cell, offering legal aid, crisis response, mental health support and public awareness.

== See also ==
- LGBT rights in India
- LGBTQ culture in Hyderabad
- LGBTQ rights in Andhra Pradesh
