= Vyjayanti Vasanta Mogli v. State of Telangana =

Indian LGBT Rights Case Law

- Court: Telangana High Court
- Full case name: Vyjayanti Vasanta Mogli & Ors. versus State of Telangana & Ors.
- Decided: 6 July 2023
- Citation: WP(PIL) No. 44 of 2018

Court membership
- Judges sitting: Ujjal Bhuyan CJ. and C.V. Bhaskar Reddy J.

Case opinions
- The Telangana Eunuchs Act was invalidated for violating Articles 14 and 21.; The Telangana State Welfare Board to collaborate with legal services authorities for the upliftment of the transgender community; Aasara Pension Scheme benefits expanded to include transgender individuals.; Implement affirmative action via vertical reservation for transgender individuals as Other Backward Class in education and government services.
- Decision by: Ujjal Bhuyan CJ. and C.V. Bhaskar Reddy J.

Keywords
- Criminal Stereotyping, Institutional Discrimination, Intersex Rights, Non-binary Gender Rights, Transgender Rights

Vyjayanti Vasanta Mogli & Ors. versus State of Telangana & Ors. (2023), a landmark decision of Telangana High Court, invalidating the Telangana Eunuchs Act of 1329 Fasli which categorized intersex, non-binary gender, and transgender individuals as susceptible to criminal actions, as it was found to be in violation of the constitution.

The court has directed the State Welfare Board for Transgender Persons in Telangana to collaborate with legal services authorities in order to ensure the successful implementation of the Transgender Persons Act of 2019, the Transgender Persons Rules of 2020, and the action plan formulated by the board. The court emphasized that the collaboration should involve proactive actions, such as actively engaging with transgender individuals to streamline the process of issuing identity certificates and ensuring access to a range of welfare programs.

The court issued a directive stating that the benefits of the Aasara Pension Scheme, which was implemented by the State Government of Telangana, must be expanded to encompass transgender individuals as a distinct group.

Until comprehensive legislation is put in place, the Court mandated the State Government of Telangana to issue government orders and administrative directives to implement affirmative action through vertical reservation for transgender individuals, as Other Backward Class, securing admission to educational institutions and facilitating recruitment into Government and public services.

== Background ==
During British rule in India, intersex, non-binary gender and transgender individuals were referred to as 'eunuchs' in a stigmatizing manner. The British introduced discriminatory laws based on gender identity, including an 1897 amendment that added 'eunuchs' to the Criminal Tribes Act of 1873, an Act that presumed certain communities were predisposed to criminal activity. The amendment introduced a separate section for 'eunuchs', defining them as impotent males. They were mandated to register with local authorities and faced restrictions on acting as guardians for minors, executing gifts or wills, and adopting sons, with violations carrying the risk of imprisonment. They were prohibited from 'dressing like a woman' in public, engaging in dance, and partaking in public exhibitions.

While the Criminal Tribes Act was repealed in 1949, similar language persisted in other laws to control and surveil transgender individuals. The current case pertains to the Telangana Eunuchs Act of 1329 Fasli, formerly known as the Andhra Pradesh (Telangana Area) Eunuchs Act of 1329 Fasli, which was initially enacted in 1919. Following the division of the united Andhra Pradesh into Telangana and Andhra Pradesh, the Act was renamed as the Telangana Eunuchs Act of 1329 Fasli. The Act empowers Police and State Authorities to the maintenance of a register detailing the names and residences of 'eunuchs' suspected of engaging in activities such as 'kidnapping and emasculating boys' or of committing 'unnatural offences' or abetting the commission of such offences.

== Petition ==
=== Constitutional Challenge ===
The petitioner challenged the constitutionality of the Telangana Eunuchs Act of 1329 Fasli in the Telangana High Court and requested the following remedies.

- A declaration that the Act is unconstitutional, and infringes on the Fundamental Rights conferred by Articles 14, 15, 19, and 21 of the Constitution.
- A request to temporarily halt the enforcement of the Act, invoking Section 151 of the Code of Civil Procedure, which grants the court authority to issue orders to ensure justice and prevent potential misuse.

=== Directive to State Government ===
The petitioner sought directives from the Telangana High Court, requesting following actions from the State Government of Telangana and its relevant Department for betterment of intersex, non-binary gender, and transgender individuals.

==== Governance and administration ====
- Establish a Transgender Welfare Board within three months, ensuring a minimum of 50 percent representation from the transgender community.
- Develop a comprehensive policy to safeguard and uphold the rights of transgender individuals.
- Develop a clear guidelines for self-identifying their gender and obtaining legal identity documents reflecting that self-identified gender.
- Implement focused training and sensitization for government officials, public servants and police officials to reduce stigma and discrimination.

==== Public Awareness ====
- Implement mass media awareness for the general public to reduce stigma and discrimination.
- Take necessary measures to create awareness among the public about the inclusion of intersex, non-binary gender, and transgender individuals in family and social life.

==== Facilities and Infrastructure ====
- Ensure the provision of separate restrooms for non-binary individuals in educational institutions, as well as in all public facilities such as hospitals, bus stations, railway stations, and public toilets.
- Implement necessary measures that allow transgender individuals unrestricted access to all public spaces, such as parks, playgrounds, and roads, as well as public institutions, such as educational institutions, hospitals, hotels and restaurants.

==== Education ====
- Formulate a scheme for reservation in educational institutions.
- Grant scholarships to transgender individuals at all levels of education, encompassing secondary and high school education, as well as graduate, post-graduate, and vocational training institutes.
- Implement gender sensitization curriculum in schools, colleges and universities to reduce stigma and discrimination.

==== Healthcare ====
- Formulate schemes that guarantee free access to medical care, encompassing gender-affirming healthcare, including gender-affirming surgery (referred to as sex reassignment surgery in the petition), pre-transition and post-transition counseling, as well as HIV treatment.
- Implement focused training and sensitization for healthcare providers to reduce stigma and discrimination.

==== Employment ====
- Formulate a scheme for reservation in public employment.
- Develop programs such as financial support for self-employment ventures and skill development programs.

==== Social Welfare ====
- Develop social welfare programs, including issuance of ration cards, pension schemes and housing schemes.
- Extend COVID-19 lockdown-related welfare schemes, eliminating the necessity for ration cards.

== Proceedings ==
The petitioners emphasized the profound repercussions of the COVID-19 lockdown, leading to a total loss of income within the Transgender community in the State of Telangana. Due to the absence of ration cards, the transgender community faced difficulties in accessing public distribution systems and COVID-19 lockdown-related welfare schemes, which were intended to alleviate the impacts of the COVID-19 lockdown and were available to the general public.The petitioners argued that their complete loss of income has rendered them unable to financially support their gender-affirming healthcare and HIV treatment.

On 27 April 2020, a two-judge Bench, consisting of Justice Raghvendra Singh Chauhan and A. Abhishek Reddy, ordered the State Government to provide a report detailing the specific actions they are taking to ensure that transgender individuals have access to essential food, consumables, and medications without cost or the need for a ration card.

The petitioners' counsel contended that transgender individuals face obstacles in obtaining ration cards due to the absence of a category for non-binary individuals in the ration card application form. This deficiency in the application form results in the denial of access to the Public Distribution System for the transgender community. The counsel emphasized that the transgender community encounters discrimination and social exclusion, leading to their limited access to healthcare services for the treatment of COVID-19. The counsel made a plea for the establishment of dedicated wards and the sensitization of medical staff to cater to the healthcare needs of transgender patients.

On 29 June 2020, a two-judge Bench, composed of Justice Raghvendra Singh Chauhan and B. Vijaysen Reddy, issued a directive to the Government, instructing them to acknowledge the concerns raised by the petitioners regarding ration cards and COVID-19 treatment. The Government is further tasked with providing the Bench with an update on the actions they have taken in response to these concerns on 6 July 2020.

== See also ==
- LGBT rights in India
- Navtej Singh Johar v. Union of India (2018)
- Puttaswamy v. Union of India (2017)
- Karnataka Sexual Minorities Forum v. State of Karnataka (2017)
- National Legal Services Authority v. Union of India (2014)
