= Black Power: The Politics of Liberation =

1967 book co-authored by Stokely Carmichael (Kwame Ture) and Charles V. Hamilton

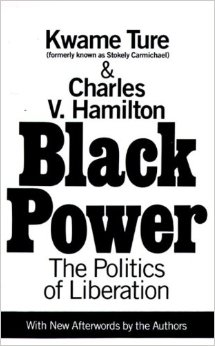
- 1992 Edition Cover
- Author: Stokely Carmichael and Charles V. Hamilton
- Language: English
- Genre: Political Philosophy, Africana Studies, Political Science
- Publication date: October 23, 1967
- Publication place: United States
- Pages: 256
- ISBN: 0679743138

Black Power: The Politics of Liberation is a 1967 book co-authored by Kwame Ture (then known as Stokely Carmichael) and political scientist Charles V. Hamilton. The work defines Black Power, presents insights into the roots of racism in the United States and suggests a means of reforming the traditional political process for the future. Published originally as Black Power: The Politics of Liberation in America, the book has become a staple work produced during the Civil Rights Movement and Black Power movement.

One of the main focuses of the book is describing the struggles that black communities faced in trying to get involved in politics. Black people had faced severe and violent discrimination since the Civil War, as well as segregation since the late nineteenth century. Consequently, the community faced problems with political participation as the community faced material consequences of systemic racism when attempting to vote or engaging with the political world. Carmichael and Hamilton cite white supremacy, colonialism, and the systemic continuation of these dynamics as drivers of disenfranchisement and racism.

These issues led to the creation of certain groups and organizations. For instance, the Student Nonviolent Coordinating Committee (SNCC) attempted to build organizational capacity within the Southern black community, offering a progressive alternative to the Democratic Party in Mississippi that would adopt the national party's platform (see Mississippi Freedom Democratic Party). By creating regional campaigns and running black candidates, SNCC saw success within their own community. However, with the limited power that this and other organizations held, their efforts to engage in the political arena for the black community were often not fully realized. This led the authors to reconceptualize Black Power as a tool for confronting the totality of oppression, not exclusively that of political representation.

Carmichael and Hamilton continue to write about the ways that black communities' attempts to be active in politics have been thwarted by self-serving groups who offer shallow allyship. Criticizing labor movements, liberals, and the middle class for being complacent in systemic racism, Black Power challenges coalitions to genuinely serve the anti-racism and the needs of the black community. Carmichael and Hamilton state, "We do not believe it is possible to form meaningful coalitions unless both or all parties are not only willing but believe it absolutely necessary to challenge [white supremacy] and other prevailing norms and institutions".

Carmichael and Hamilton write that Black Power meant more than simply changing the physical, material conditions of inequality faced by black Americans; it also meant changing perspectives of race relations in a historical context, both inside and outside the community. The authors believe Black Power not only rests in dismantling white supremacy, but also in establishing camaraderie within the black community. In this way, Black Power disavows the legitimacy of liberal, conformist politics, and instead seeks a degree of sovereignty for black community.

Ohio prison library included Black Power in its list of books in 1975.

== See also ==
- Institutional racism
- Where Do We Go from Here: Chaos or Community?
