= Institutional discrimination =

Institutional discrimination is discriminatory treatment of an individual or group of individuals by institutions, through unequal consideration of members of subordinate groups. Societal discrimination is discrimination by society. These unfair and indirect methods of discrimination are often embedded in an institution's policies, procedures, laws, and objectives. The discrimination can be on grounds of gender, caste, race, ethnicity, religion, disability, or socio-economic status. State religions are a form of societal discrimination.

== Institutional racism ==
Institutional racism (also known as systemic racism) is a form of institutional discrimination applied to race and considered a form of racism that is embedded as normal practice within an institution. It can lead to such issues as discrimination in criminal justice, employment, housing, health care, political power, and education, among other issues.

The term institutional racism was coined in 1967 by Stokely Carmichael and Charles V. Hamilton in Black Power: The Politics of Liberation. Carmichael and Hamilton wrote that while individual racism is often identifiable because of its overt nature, institutional racism is less perceptible because of its "less overt, far more subtle" nature. Institutional racism "originates in the operation of established and respected forces in the society, and thus receives far less public condemnation than [individual racism]".

== In the United States ==
Members of minority groups such as populations of African descent in the U.S. are at a much higher risk of encountering these types of sociostructural disadvantage. Among the severe and long-lasting detrimental effects of institutionalized discrimination on affected populations are increased suicide rates, suppressed attainment of wealth and decreased access to health care.

== See also ==
- Achievement gap
- Affirmative action
- Environmental racism
- Gentrification
- Harassment
- Institutional abuse
- Redlining
- Residential segregation
- Sentencing disparity
- Structural discrimination
- Structural violence
- Exclusionary zoning
