= Mobbera Foundation =

Mobbera Foundation is an LGBTQIA+ community organisation based in Hyderabad, Telangana, India. Founded in 2015, the organisation works on LGBTQIA+ rights, community support, public awareness, and inclusion. Its activities have included cultural events, community discussions, workplace sensitisation programmes, and initiatives related to healthcare and employment.

== History ==
Mobbera Foundation emerged from a community initiative that began with a WhatsApp group and a flash mob before developing into an organisation focused on LGBTQIA+ people in Hyderabad. Its activities have included providing opportunities for community members to connect, access support, and participate in public and cultural events.

The organisation's work has been documented in local media coverage of LGBTQIA+ community activities in Hyderabad. In January 2021, Telangana Today reported on its Queer Katha event, which provided a platform for community members to share personal experiences through storytelling, poetry, film, and performances.

== Activities ==
=== Community events and cultural programmes ===
Mobbera Foundation has organised cultural and community events intended to provide LGBTQIA+ people with opportunities for social interaction and creative expression. Its programmes have included performances, poetry sessions, discussions, and events addressing experiences of gender and sexuality.

In March 2022, the organisation hosted Mehfil-e-Queer 2.0 at Lamakaan, a cultural venue in Hyderabad. The programme included dance, poetry, and other artistic performances by LGBTQIA+ participants. The event also provided space for queer entrepreneurs to display and sell their products.

=== Healthcare and community support ===
During the COVID-19 pandemic, Mobbera Foundation participated in initiatives addressing the needs of LGBTQIA+ people in Hyderabad. In June 2021, Telangana Today reported on the organisation's involvement in facilitating COVID-19 vaccinations for transgender people and its Community Connect initiative, which included online sessions intended to help participants develop professional skills.

The organisation has also conducted community gatherings and discussions addressing isolation, acceptance, and the difficulties LGBTQIA+ people may encounter when they lack support from their families. Its Queer Katha programme, reported in January 2021, combined personal storytelling with cultural performances and discussions about coming out and social acceptance.

=== Employment and workplace inclusion ===
Mobbera Foundation has undertaken initiatives intended to improve employment opportunities and workplace inclusion for LGBTQIA+ people. In June 2023, The New Indian Express reported on Project Upadhi, an employment initiative described as connecting queer people with job opportunities at corporate organisations. The newspaper also reported on the foundation's workplace sensitisation sessions addressing LGBTQIA+ inclusion.

== See also ==
- LGBTQ rights in India
- LGBTQ culture in Hyderabad
