= Charles V. Hamilton =

American political scientist (1929–2023)

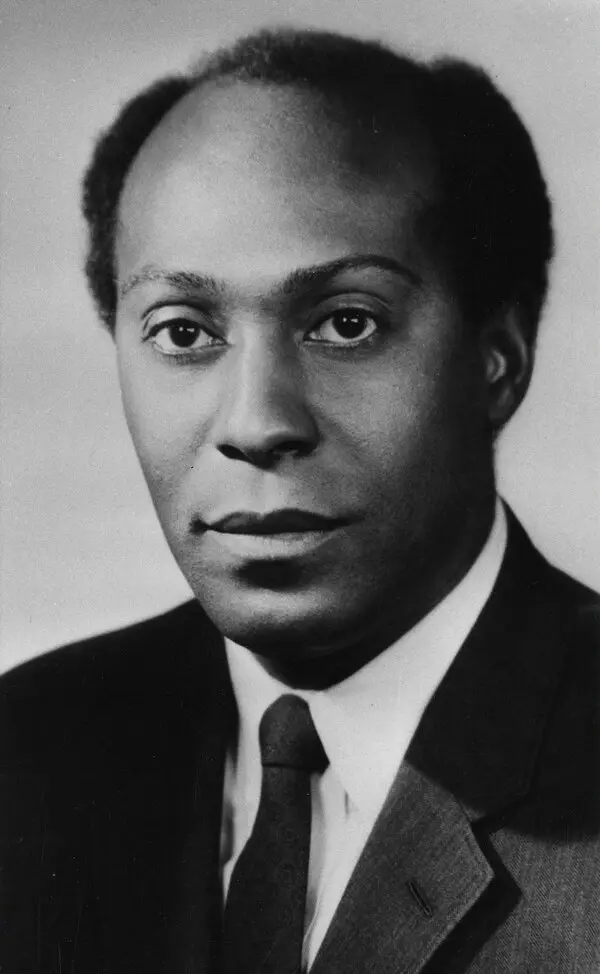
- Charles V. Hamilton in 1969
- Born: October 19, 1929; Muskogee, Oklahoma, United States
- Died: November 18, 2023 (aged 94); Chicago, United States
- Education: Political scientist Professor of Government and Political Science
- Known for: Civil rights leader One of the first African Americans to hold an endowed chair at an Ivy League university
- Notable work: Black Power: The Politics of Liberation
- Title: W. S. Sayre Professor of Government and Political Science at Columbia University
- Movement: Black Power Movement; Civil Rights Movement
- Spouse: Dona Cooper Hamilton (1955-)

Charles Vernon Hamilton (October 19, 1929 – November 18, 2023) was an American political scientist, civil rights leader, and the W. S. Sayre Professor of Government and Political Science at Columbia University.

== Biography ==
Hamilton was born in Muskogee, Oklahoma on October 19, 1929, and was the middle child between his elder brother Owen Hamilton Jr. and younger sister Lyna Hamilton- Williams. His family moved to the southside of Chicago, Illinois in 1935, which is where he was raised. He had aspirations to be a journalist growing up, but he was dissuaded as, in his words, "there [weren't] many jobs for black people who want to be journalists." He went to Roosevelt University to study political science and graduated in 1951, and went on to earn a master's degree in 1957 from the University of Chicago. He joined the Tuskegee Institute faculty in 1958, but his contract there was terminated in 1960, and he returned to the University of Chicago, where he earned a Ph.D. in 1964. He held faculty positions at Rutgers University, Lincoln University (Pennsylvania), and Roosevelt University before joining the Columbia University faculty in 1969. Hamilton retired from the Columbia faculty in 1998 and later moved to Chicago.

His most noted work is Black Power: The Politics of Liberation, written with Stokely Carmichael.

Ellis Cashmore and James Jennings argue that Hamilton and Carmichael were the first to use the term institutional racism in a systematic fashion.

== Activism and Beliefs ==
Hamilton has said he never wanted to be a professor for its own sake, but for the cause of the advancement of black people in society. He wanted to be an "academic activist," rather than a professor who was politically neutral. During his job as a professor, he was involved in activist groups like the Student Nonviolent Coordinating Committee, which Kwame Ture was also a part of. According to his account, his activist attitudes and behavior are what caused him to be fired from universities including Tuskegee several times. In between his positions as a professor, he would return home to work at the post office to pay his bills. Additionally, he claims to have FBI reports that indicate that his coworkers at Tuskegee had identified him as a communist. The FBI would later come to his house and tap his phone, which Hamilton consented to. However, he has expressed dissatisfaction with Marxism for being class-reductionist and ignoring the issues of race that he has dedicated his life to.

When Black Power: The Politics of Liberation was about to be published in 1967, Random House threatened to cancel the publishing of the book because of Kwame Ture's calls for revolution and association with Fidel Castro. Hamilton and Ture made a deal with Random House to publish the book with a message before the first page, which reads as follows:

"This book presents a political framework and ideology which represents the last reasonable opportunity for this society to work out its racial problems short of prolonged destructive guerrilla warfare. That such violent warfare may be unavoidable is not herein denied. But if there is the slightest chance to avoid it, the politics of Black Power as described in this book is seen as the only viable hope."

After the Nixon presidency, Hamilton worked with the Democratic Party as a strategist. He proposed messaging he described as "deracialization," which involves advocating for reforms that will address institutional racism without directly mentioning racism in order to avoid blowback from white people who did not believe that racism was an important issue. Because of this, he was criticized by black activists who believed that he was ignoring or downplaying issues of racial justice for money and/or status. Hamilton responded by saying that he was simply using deracialization as a means to the end of achieving racial justice through the electoral system.

Ellis Cashmore and James Jennings argue that Hamilton and Carmichael were the first to use the term institutional racism in a systematic fashion. Hamilton said he and Carmichael used this term to address the disconnect between the general (especially white) public's perception of racism and the everyday reality of systemic oppression that black people in the United States face. He explained it in this way in a November 21, 1967 interview with Studs Terkel:

"We went to school. It was called a school of slavery and a school of segregation. And the lessons were very clear. Let me state it as bluntly as possible: You hate yourself. You are supposed to hate yourself because you are a quote 'minority,' you are different. You are lazy, apathetic, and so forth. And you pass out of this school and pass those lessons to the extent that you believe this, you see. Now a lot of people in this country, white and black, really don't believe that. They don't believe that the system deliberately did this to us. Because they... personally have never insisted that a black man hate himself, you know. And they personally have never really hanged or lynched a black man recently, you know. But that is not the point. That is not the point Stokely and I want to make in this book. The point we are trying to make in this book is that one's individual stance in relationship to the black man is irrelevant. It's what the system does and that's why we use the term 'institutional racism'."

Hamilton also takes issue with narratives that black people must integrate into American society. Referencing James Baldwin's "Nobody Knows My Name," claims that black people are taught to hate themselves, and people who hate themselves cannot truly integrate into a society because they will suppress their true selves. He adds that when white people are making these calls for integration, they are rarely made from a place of goodwill, but out of a desire for black people to suppress their culture and act more like the white elites who oppress them.

Hamilton's pioneering work on Black Power and institutional racism has left an enduring impact on political science and civil rights activism, influencing generations of scholars and activists. His concept of 'institutional racism' reshaped public discourse, providing a framework for understanding systemic discrimination beyond individual acts of prejudice. Scholars and civil rights leaders have continued to draw on his work, citing his insights as foundational to the study of systemic racism in America.

== Death ==
On February 18, 2024, it was announced that Hamilton had died in Chicago on November 18, 2023, at the age of 94. His death was confirmed to the New York Times by his nephew Kevin Lacey and friends Wilmot James and Jeh C. Johnson. Lacey stated that the delay in revealing his death was due to the fact that Hamilton, who lived a modest and private life, was "concerned about what would or would not happen upon his passing."

== Works ==
External videos
- Booknotes interview with Hamilton on Adam Clayton Powell, Jr., January 5, 1992, C-SPAN

- Stokely Carmichael & Hamilton C. V. (1967), Black Power: The Politics of Liberation, New York: Vintage
- Hamilton C. V. (1972), The Black Preacher in America, New York: William Morrow
- Hamilton C. V. (1974), Bench and the Ballot: Southern Federal Judges and Black Voters, Oxford: Oxford University Press
- Hamilton C. V. (1981), American Government, Glenview: Scott Foresman & Co
- Hamilton C. V. & Hamilton, D. C. (1992), Adam Clayton Powell Jr.: The Political Biography of an American Dilemma, New York: Simon & Schuster
- Hamilton C. V. & Hamilton, D. C. (1997), The Dual Agenda, New York: Columbia University Press
