= Vyjayanti Vasanta Mogli =

Transgender activist, singer and motivational speaker based in India

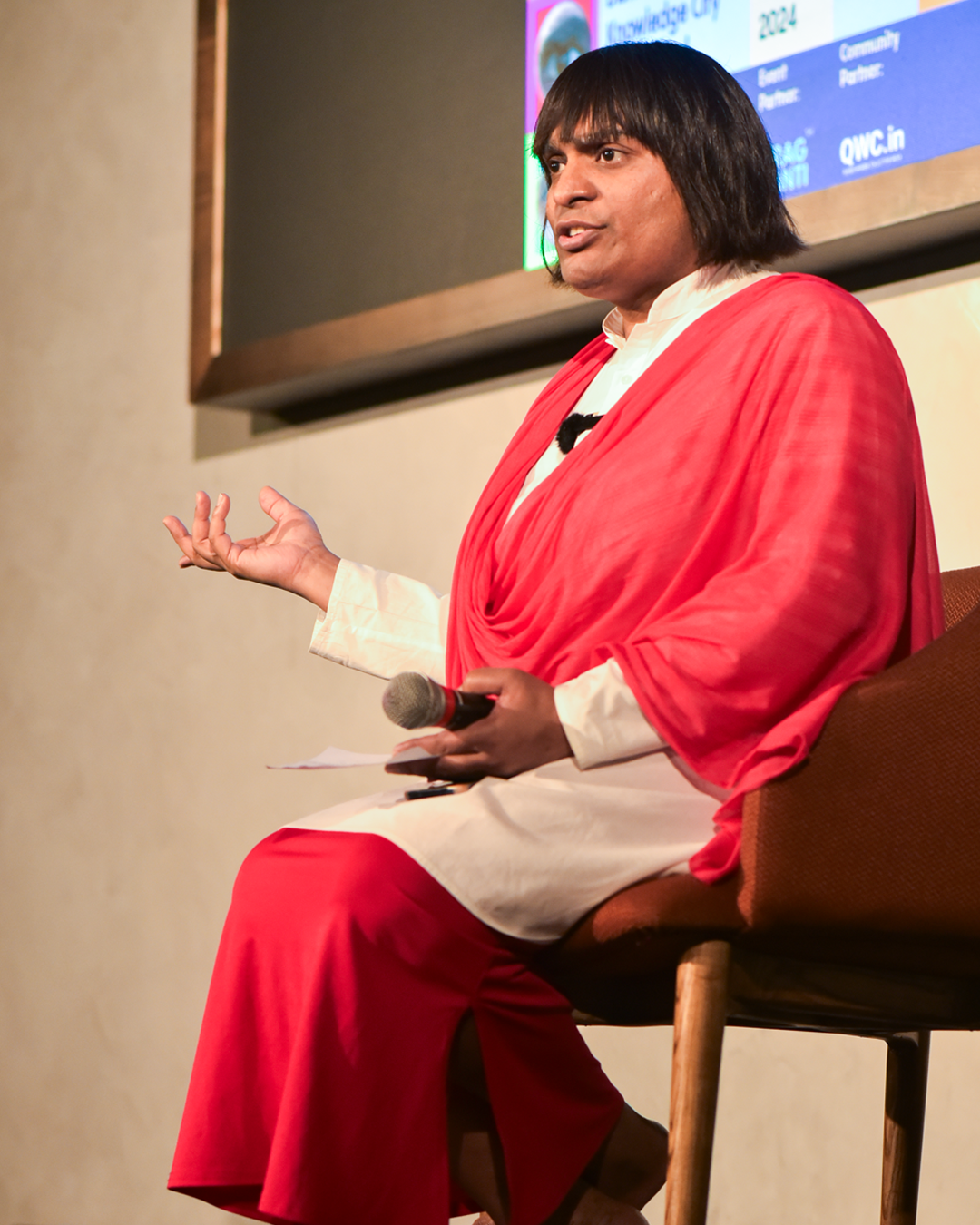
- Born: Hyderabad, India
- Occupations: Transgender rights activist; RTI Activist; singer

Vyjayanti Vasanta Mogli is an Indian transgender activist, RTI activist, singer and motivational speaker. She intervened in the “Suresh Kumar Kaushal & Other vs Naz Foundation & Others” case in the Supreme Court in 2014 in which she highlighted the deleterious effects of conversion or reparative therapy on queer people through her affidavit.

== Early life and career ==
Assigned male at birth, Vyjayanti is from Hyderabad. Vyjayanti had a rough childhood where she was prone to school abuse, conversion therapy, bullying and assault. In an interview, Vyjayanti said "They couldn’t understand (it), nor were they willing to understand, for them it was some unproductive rubbish, some trash that they had to deal with". Talking about how she tackled the journey, Vyjayanti said "Though I am not a voracious reader, there are a few books that have influenced me greatly".

Vyjayanti had been working in the corporate sector for 17 years and been associated with organizations like TISS, Bhumika, Anveshi and Centre For Law And Policy Research, Bangalore.

In 2015, Vyjayanti was stopped from a movie while visiting GVK mall in Hyderabad. Vyjayanti said "We were waiting next to the ticket counter and there were easily more than 50 people at the spot. But the guard, who said he was doing his duty and checking people with suspicious behavior, singled us out. And it was quite obvious why". She did file a complaint in police station also ensured the mall apologizes for discrimination.

== Activism ==
Vyjayanti started her career of activism at Queer Swabhimana Yatra and is one of the founders of Telangana Hijra Intersex Transgender Samiti, an LGBT Right group based out of Hyderabad. Since then, she has been fighting a battle for ensuring dignity and rights of transgender persons as well sexual minority. She was in forefront to file charge sheet against rowdy sheeter who was attacking trans persons in the city of Hyderabad. She asked the state Government of Telangana to manifest more stronger policy for protecting transgender persons. She felt that the draconian law of Section 377 of Indian Penal Code should be abolished, because she had been abused and violated by police on multiple occasions under this law, she said "Village medics and babas often prescribe rape to cure lesbians of homosexuality. Refusal to marry brings more physical abuse. Stories of family acceptance that you see on TV and other media are more of an urban phenomenon". Vyjayanti also voiced about the disrupt the "Behroopiyas" causing for Hyderabad transgender community and seek police intervention.

In solidarity for the acid attack on trans women, Sonia Vyjayanti said "She cannot go out in the sun because her skin will burn. But she cannot be sitting in the house either. She does not have the luxury to do that, But the poor do not know that they don't have to pay. They just have to tell the hospital to claim it from Arogyashree or the Telangana Acid Attack Victims Compensation Fund. But private hospitals don't want to run around to get their own money from the government. It is too much of a hassle for them. So, they choose to play on the ignorance of the victims and their families," and asked for better law for curtailing such crimes. She also voiced out the atrocities of corrective rapes and highlighted the urgency to give protection for queer individuals. Vyjayanti has voiced out her disagreement about Citizenship (Amendment) Act, 2019. As a response to an interview, Vyjayanti said "We wanted to bring people from various backgrounds to talk about the draconian Citizenship Amendment Act." Vyjayanti petitioned to the High court about the harassments faced by trans community as a part of the Trans bill 2019, She said “We are told we are illegal– that our existence, our livelihood is illegal– that gender identity and expression is illegal. This is what we are challenging with this petition.”

Vyjayanti was also one of three people to put a PIL against Telangana Eunuchs act, 1329 Fasli. Later, on 6 July 2023, Telangana High Court struck down the act as unconstitutional and ultra vires the Constitution of India. She was against the centre's proposed Transgender Persons (Protection of Rights) Bill 2017. She also was one of the members to put an appeal for fair probe of CJI Sexual assault case. In 2020, Vyjayanti voiced out the pleat of troubles faced by transgender community in middle of the lockdown. She said, "Given the way the economy is going and how tied up healthcare workers are going to be in the near future with COVID-19, there is some fear that the cost of the surgery may increase."

== Selected Keynotes and Panel Discussions ==
- ICCR Samanatha 2021
- Rainbow Lit Fest 2020
- Ampliying Pride 2019
- UFLS
- Public session: Gender in Media: Continuities and Discontinuities
- TISS Webinar on "Socio-economic inclusion of transgender persons"
- Hyderabad Lit Festival
- Orange the World: End Violence against Women Now.
- IIIT LGBT Awareness Event
