= Rachana Mudraboyina =

Indian transgender rights activist

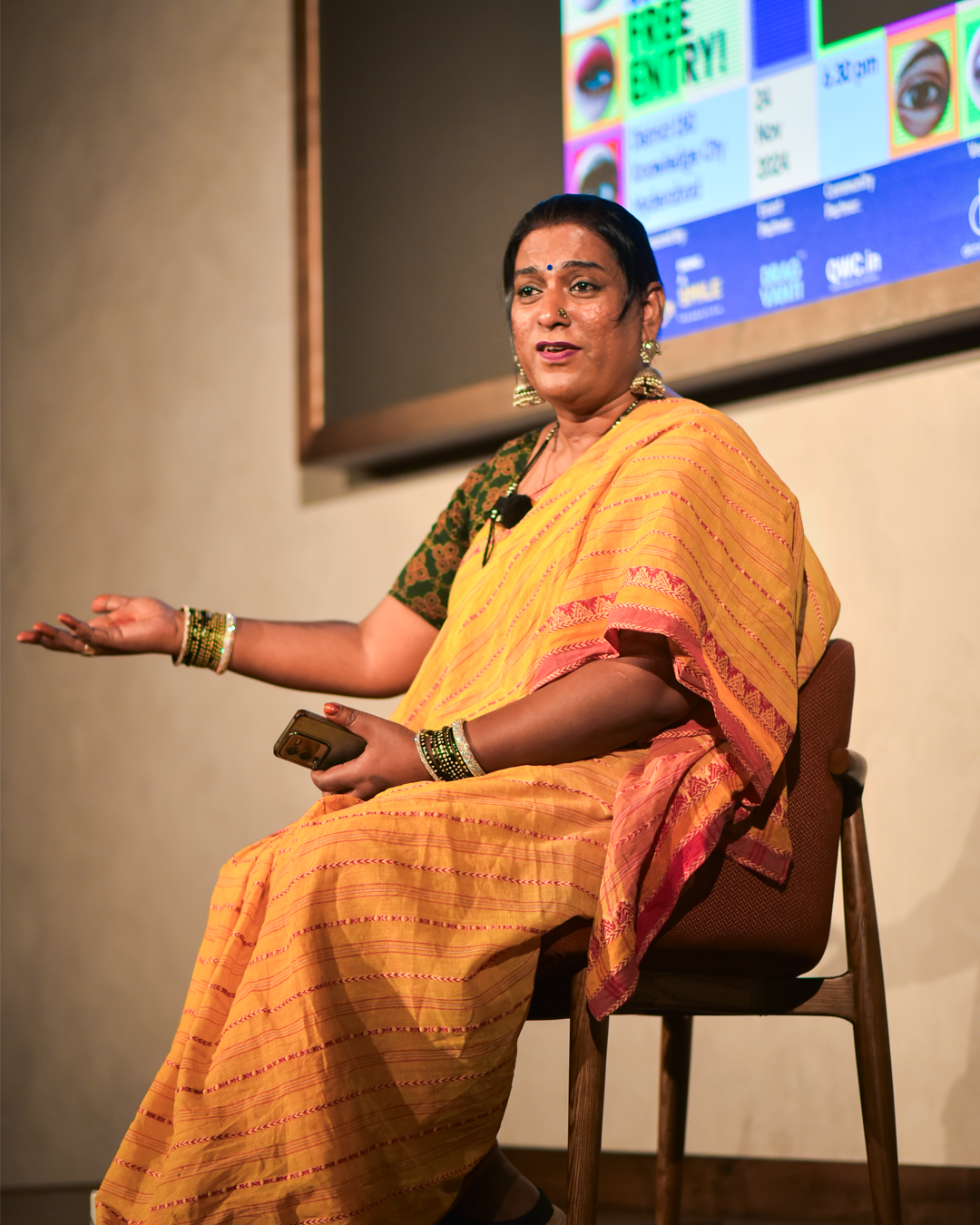
- Born: 28 May 1977 (age 49); Hyderabad, India
- Education: Osmania University; Institute of Advanced Studies in Education; Nagarjuna University
- Occupations: Transgender rights activist; Actor; singer

Rachana Mudraboyina (born 28 May 1977, Rajahmundry, Andhra Pradesh) is an Indian transgender rights activist based in Telangana. She is associated with transgender community organisations, public-health programmes, legal and policy advocacy, and media projects.

== Early life and education ==
Mudraboyina studied at Osmania University, where she completed a Bachelor of Commerce from 1994 to 1997. She later completed a Master of Commerce at the Institute of Advanced Studies in Education, Gandhi Vidya Mandir, from 2003 to 2004, and a Master of Social Work from Nagarjuna University from 2008 to 2009.

== Career ==
From 2005 to 2013, Mudraboyina worked as a National Key Population Consultant with PATH India's Interact Project. Her work included training and capacity-building programmes involving transgender people, female sex workers, men who have sex with men, injecting drug users and people living with HIV/AIDS. She also participated in the development of training material for the National AIDS Control Organisation.

From 2013 to 2014, she worked as a State Advocacy Officer for the Pehchan project of the India HIV/AIDS Alliance. She was also a project manager for an HIV-prevention project involving transgender sex workers at the Darpan Foundation in 2009.

Mudraboyina has been associated with the Telangana Hijra Intersex Transgender Samiti since 2014. She is also listed as a founding member of the Telangana Queer Swabhimana Yatra collective.

== Legal and policy advocacy ==
Mudraboyina has participated in consultations concerning proposed legislation on transgender rights. In 2015, she organised a Know Your Rights workshop addressing laws and policing affecting transgender and hijra communities, including Section 377 of the Indian Penal Code, the Hyderabad Eunuchs Act and the Andhra Pradesh Prevention of Begging Act.

In 2016, she participated in consultations concerning the Transgender Persons (Protection of Rights) Bill and was involved in organising a public rally concerning the proposed legislation. She also participated in a People's Tribunal concerning the implementation of the Supreme Court's NALSA v. Union of India judgment.

In 2017, she participated in consultations concerning amendments to the Rights of Transgender Persons Bill and discussions concerning transgender law and policy. She was also had involvement in assisting transgender people with complaints and first information reports concerning alleged human-rights violations.

In 2018, Mudraboyina participated in consultations concerning the Transgender Persons (Protection of Rights) Bill and the Trafficking of Persons Bill. She was also associated with legal consultations organised by the Human Rights Law Network and the International Commission of Jurists.

She has been associated with the Human Rights Law Network, where she held positions including acting director dealing with LGBTQI issues from 2018 and board membership from 2019.

== Research Contributions ==
Mudraboyina has contributed to the development of transgender studies in India through community-based documentation, advocacy, public-health work and media initiatives. Her work has included participation in research on transgender communities in Hyderabad and discussions on the social, legal and economic conditions affecting transgender people. She has also contributed to analyses of transgender legislation, including co-authoring critiques of the Transgender Persons (Protection of Rights) Bills of 2018 and 2019, addressing issues including self-identification, healthcare, welfare and legal recognition.

Her work has also been documented in academic and research publications examining transgender mobilisation and community development in contemporary India. Through TransVision, a transgender-focused digital media project she founded, she produced material intended to document transgender experiences and communicate information about gender and transgender issues to a wider audience. These activities have placed her work at the intersection of community knowledge, public policy, healthcare and emerging transgender studies in India.

== TransVision ==
In 2017, Mudraboyina founded the TransVision YouTube channel. She directed web series in Telugu, Urdu and Kannada, including Aa Ee... Anjali, Alif... Sonia and Akshara... Jahnavi.

From 2021, Mudraboyina was associated with Mitr, a transgender healthcare clinic in Hyderabad, as a transgender health expert. From March 2025, she was also listed as a transgender health expert at Sabrang sexual health clinic under YRG Care.

In 2022, she participated in initiatives concerning transgender legal clinics, healthcare policy and access to healthcare in Telangana.

Ranchana also sang in a Tamil film for actor Rajinikanth making them the first every trans band from south.

Mudraboyina participated in the United States Department of State's International Visitor Leadership Program in 2016, with a focus on transgender issues. She also participated in international meetings and conferences concerning transgender rights, including programmes in South Africa, Argentina and Colombia. Mudraboyina has participated in research projects concerning transgender communities, including research with social-science scholar Pushpesh Kumar. She has also participated in university programmes, conferences and panels concerning transgender rights, law and policy.
