= Sravan Telu =

Indian dancer

- Born: Hyderabad, India
- Occupations: Belly Dancer; Drag Queen; Activist

Sravan Kumar Telu is an Indian belly dancer and LGBTQI+ activist based in Hyderabad, Telangana. He is known for performing belly dance as a male dancer in India and for his involvement in LGBTQI+ community and cultural events in Hyderabad.

== Early life and education ==
Sravan Kumar was born in Vijayawada, Andhra Pradesh. He developed an interest in dance during his college years and participated in folk dance, Western dance and other performing arts. He studied at SRR & CVR Government Degree College in Vijayawada and later pursued a Master of Computer Applications (MCA) at PVP Siddhartha Institute of Technology.

He subsequently worked in the information-technology sector while continuing his interest in dance and performance.

== Dance career ==
Sravan began learning belly dance after watching online videos of dancer Meher Malik. According to interviews with The Times of India and The News Minute, he began practising the form around 2011 and initially learned through online tutorials. He later attended formal training and workshops, including a workshop conducted by Meher Malik in Hyderabad in 2018.

He gave his first public performances in 2014 and subsequently performed at various events in Hyderabad and other parts of India. He became associated with Payal's Dance Academy, where he received formal training in belly dance.

His performances attracted attention because belly dance in India is often associated with women, and male participation in the form is comparatively uncommon. In interviews, Sravan has discussed gender stereotypes surrounding dance and argued that dance forms should not be restricted according to gender.

Telu Sravan started doing drag in 2023 with his drag mother Patruni Sastry in the city of Hyderabad. He goes by the name Sra Devi.

== LGBTQI+ activism ==
Sravan has participated in LGBTQI+ community activities in Hyderabad. His involvement with the community developed alongside his dance career, and he has spoken publicly about experiencing discrimination because of his participation in a dance form commonly perceived as feminine.

He has performed at LGBTQI+ events, including the Hyderabad Pride parade and queer cultural programmes. In 2023, he was listed among performers at the Hyderabad Queer Dance Festival, where he performed belly dance to the poem "Keep Dancing" by Relyks.

Sravan has also been associated with Dragvanti, an Indian platform for drag artists and queer cultural programming. He participated in the Hyderabad Bi/Pan Festival, where he was described as a male belly dancer
