= Indian Coming Out Day =

LGBT Awareness day in India, 2 July

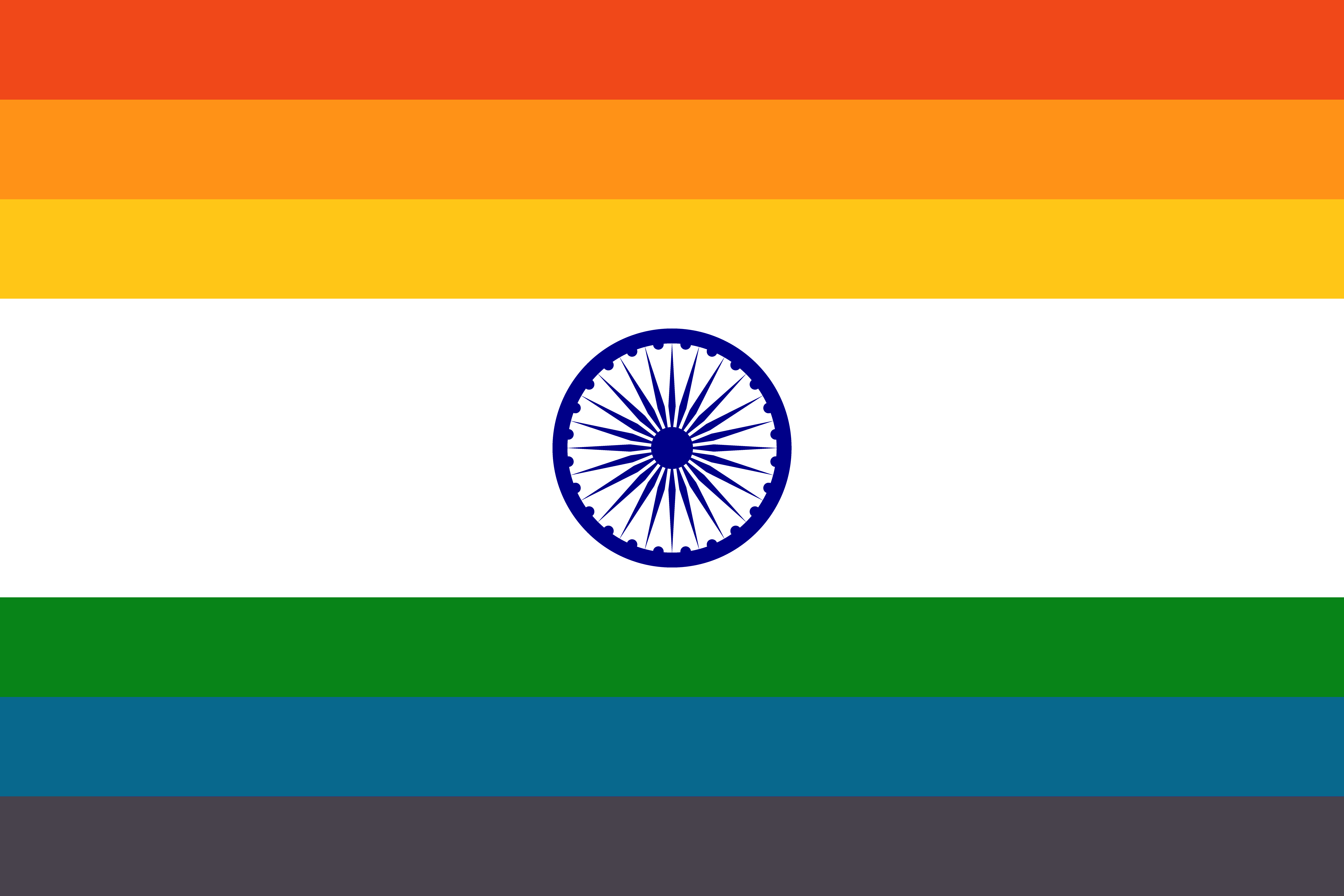
- Unofficial pride flag representing the LGBT community of India
- Observed by: Indian LGBT community
- Type: LGBTQ awareness day
- Observances: Coming out
- Date: 2 July
- Next time: July 2, 2027
- Frequency: Annual
- First time: 2 July 2012
- Related to: National Coming Out Day

Indian Coming Out Day is an annual LGBTQ awareness day observed on 2 July, to support anyone coming out of the closet. This day is celebrated in commemoration of Naz Foundation v. Govt. of NCT of Delhi case which resulted in the decriminalisation of homosexual sexual activity in India by reading down of Section 377 of the Indian Penal Code by the Delhi High Court.

== History ==
On July 2, 2009, the Delhi High Court decriminalised homosexual sexual activity by reading down the Section 377 of the Indian Penal Code. A number of organisations across India celebrated this day with public events. The first coming out day was celebrated in 2010 and started by Shyam Konnur, founder and director of Mist LGBTQ Foundation. This became of special importance with the 2009 judgement was overturned in 2013 in the Suresh Kumar Koushal v. Naz Foundation case in the Supreme Court of India. The India Coming Out Day became of special importance after this as organisations celebrated this day as a mark of protest.
