= Naz Foundation v. Government of NCT of Delhi =

Indian LGBT Rights Case

Naz Foundation v. Govt. of NCT of Delhi
- Court: Delhi High Court
- Decided: 2 July 2009
- Citation: 160 Delhi Law Times 277

Court membership
- Judges sitting: Chief Justice Ajit Prakash Shah; Justice S. Muralidhar

Laws applied
- Overruled by
- Suresh Kumar Koushal v. Naz Foundation by Supreme Court of India

Keywords
- Criminalization of Homosexuality

Naz Foundation v. Govt. of NCT of Delhi (2009) is a landmark Indian case decided by a two-judge bench of the Delhi High Court, which held that treating consensual homosexual sex between adults as a crime is a violation of fundamental rights protected by India's Constitution. The verdict resulted in the decriminalization of homosexual acts involving consenting adults throughout India. This was later overturned by the Supreme Court of India in Suresh Kumar Koushal vs. Naz Foundation, in which a two-judge bench reinstated Section 377 of the Indian Penal Code. However, even that was overturned by a five-judge bench in Navtej Singh Johar v. Union of India in 2018, decriminalizing homosexuality once again.

== Background ==
Section 377 of the Indian Penal Code, introduced during British rule of India, criminalizes "carnal intercourse against the order of nature". This phrase was interpreted to mean all forms of sexual activity other than heterosexual penile-vaginal intercourse.

The movement to repeal Section 377 was led by the Naz Foundation (India) Trust, a non-governmental organization, which filed a lawsuit in the Delhi High Court in 2001, seeking legalisation of homosexual intercourse between consenting adults. This was the second such petition, the first filed in 1994 by AIDS Bhedbhav Virodhi Andolan. In 2003, the Delhi High Court refused to consider a petition regarding the legality of the law, saying that the petitioners had no locus standi in the matter. Naz Foundation appealed to the Supreme Court of India against the decision of the High Court to dismiss the petition on technical grounds. The Supreme Court decided that Naz Foundation had the standing to file a public interest lawsuit in this case, and sent the case back to the Delhi High Court to consider it on the merits.

In 2006, the National AIDS Control Organisation filed an affidavit stating that the enforcement of Section 377 violates LGBTQ rights. Subsequently, there was a significant intervention in the case by a Delhi-based coalition of LGBT, women's and human rights activists called "Voices Against 377", which supported the demand to "read down" Section 377 to exclude adult consensual sex from its purview.

== Judgement ==
The case came up for hearing before a bench comprising Chief Justice Ajit Prakash Shah and Justice S. Muralidhar, and the judgment was delivered on 2 July 2009. The Court located the rights to dignity and privacy within the right to life and liberty guaranteed by Article 21 (under the fundamental Right to Freedom charter) of the Constitution, and held that criminalization of consensual gay sex violated these rights.

The Court also held that Section 377 offends the guarantee of equality enshrined in Article 14 (under the fundamental Right to Equality charter) of the Constitution, because it creates an unreasonable classification and targets homosexuals as a class. Public animus and disgust towards a particular social group or vulnerable minority, it held, is not a valid ground for classification under Article 14. Article 15 of the Constitution forbids discrimination based on certain characteristics, including sex. The Court held that the word "sex" includes not only biological sex but also sexual orientation, and therefore discrimination on the ground of sexual orientation is not permissible under Article 15. The Court also noted that the right to life under Article 21 includes the right to health, and concluded that Section 377 is an impediment to public health because it hinders HIV-prevention efforts.

The Court did not strike down Section 377 as a whole. The section was declared unconstitutional insofar it criminalises consensual sexual acts of adults in private. The judgement keeps intact the provision insofar as it applies to non-consensual non-vaginal intercourse and intercourse with minors. The court stated that the judgement would hold until Parliament chose to amend the law.

== Significance ==
According to an eyewitness account, as the Chief Justice read out the conclusion, "an audible gasp went around the room. By the time the Chief Justice had finished reading the conclusion of the judgment, people were openly weeping and there were handshakes and hugs all around." Within hours, news of the judgment was being carried by international news sites. Lawrence Liang called it India's Roe moment. Activists, commentators and organizations like UNAIDS lauded the decision, while some religious leaders and politicians voiced displeasure over the judgment.

Some special leave petitions were filed in the Supreme Court requesting an interim stay of the judgment, pending an appeal. However, the Supreme Court rejected those requests. A batch of appeals were filed with the Supreme Court, challenging the Delhi High Court judgment. On 27 March 2012, the Supreme Court reserved verdict on these. After initially opposing the judgment, the Attorney General G. E. Vahanvati decided not to file any appeal against the Delhi High Court's verdict, stating, "insofar as [Section 377 of the Indian Penal Code] criminalises consensual sexual acts of adults in private [before it was struck down by the High Court] was imposed upon Indian society due to the moral views of the British rulers."

On 11 December 2013, the Supreme Court's two member bench (Justices G. S. Singhvi and S. J. Mukhopadhaya) overturned the decision of the Delhi High Court. It said that the 2009 order of the High Court is "constitutionally unsustainable as only Parliament can change a law, not courts".

But, on 6 September 2018, a five judge constitutional bench of the Supreme Court of India, in a landmark judgement, decriminalized homosexuality and banned discrimination based on sexual orientation.

2 July has been celebrated as the Indian Coming Out Day to mark the date of this judgement.

== See also ==
- LGBT rights in India
- Navtej Singh Johar v. Union of India (2018)
- Suresh Kumar Koushal v. Naz Foundation (2013)

=== Similar landmark decisions ===
- Lawrence v. Texas
- Jones v. Trinidad and Tobago
