= Kamla Jaan =

Indian politician (c. 1954–2019)

Kamla Jaan (c. 1954 – 14 November 2019) was an Indian hijra politician. Jaan was elected mayor of Katni in 2000, becoming the first eunuch mayor in the history of India. In 2002, a judge ruled that Jaan was ineligible to serve as mayor, as the position was reserved for a woman and Jaan was registered as a man. After an appeal, Jaan was removed from office in 2003.

== Identity ==
Jaan was a hijra, a person of a third gender, and referred to herself with feminine pronouns. She has also been described as trans. Most hijras identify as feminine, though because they are generally born male and later castrated, they are often described as eunuchs. Hijras were traditionally regarded as auspicious and respected for their role in guarding harems. However, in recent times hijras have often been treated with contempt. Hijras mostly earn a living through ritualistic begging, such as by performing at and blessing weddings and childbirths, or through sex work. Hijras of marginalized castes, though, are prevented from performing in auspicious ceremonies. Described by scholars as a "highly stigmatised gender minority group", hijras have limited government recognition or support, despite being the most visible queer community in India.

Early hijra political engagement in the 1980s aimed to win government guarantees of their civil rights; this resulted in the government giving hijras the right to vote in 1994. Hijras were not initially active in protests against Section 377, which criminalized homosexuality, despite this affecting one of their primary occupations.

At the time of Jaan's entry into politics, hijras were gaining prominence as political candidates due to voter frustration with the two major political parties, the Congress Party and the BJP. As hijras live in communes and have no family or heirs, they were perceived as independent of special interests and better able to represent the people.

== Tenure as mayor ==
Before running for mayor, Jaan was not a politician. She was drafted as an independent candidate by prominent citizens of Katni as "a way to snub the major parties"; her low social status as a hijra was used to "express contempt for the political establishment".

Katni typically saw strong support for the Indian National Congress, but at the time there was great dissatisfaction with the mainstream political parties, which were perceived as nepotistic, corrupt, and incompetent. A group of merchants, lawyers, and others sought to draft another candidate to compete with that of the Congress Party in the 2000 mayoral race. Under a quota system, the position of mayor of Katni was reserved for a woman that year. The group discovered that Jaan was listed as female on the voter rolls, (Note: It was later reported that she was registered as male.) whereupon a reporter in the group named Gopal Singhania asked Jaan to run for mayor. Singhania described her as "nothing special"; the group simply sought a hijra candidate due to the reputation of hijras. Jaan assented, provided the group seeking to draft her paid for her campaign expenses.

As a candidate, Jaan drew large crowds. Though at first her candidacy seemed like a "mere prank", it became apparent that she had a chance at victory, which prompted the group of patrons supporting her to draft a manifesto and promise that she would be guided by advisors were she to take office.

Jaan won the election by 1,897 votes and took office as mayor of Katni in January 2000. She berated and dismissed the advisors her patrons had arranged for her. Her manner of speech was described by The New York Times as "foul-mouthed", "gruff", and "vulgar". Both led to her being criticized as "unpredictable" and "abusive" by her former patrons, though her supporters saw this as evidence of her independence and strength. Among Jaan's achievements were sinking new tube wells, fixing drains, and renovating the main bus station. As she was illiterate, others had to interpret documents for her.

At the time, state law in Madhya Pradesh was unclear, defining some hijra as male and others as female. A judge ruled in August 2002 that Jaan was male, which made her ineligible to be mayor of Katni, a position reserved for women in the 2000 election under a quota system. On appeal, the Madhya Pradesh High Court granted a temporary stay on the decision, before ruling on 3 February 2003 to uphold the lower court ruling, removing Jaan from office.

Shabnam Mausi, another prominent hijra politician, pointed out that the court did not rule that hijras are male or decide the broader issue of the legal sex of hijras. Jaan was ruled ineligible for mayor because she was registered as a male on the electoral rolls, not because she was a hijra. As such, Mausi encouraged hijra candidates seeking to run for seats reserved for women to register as women, to prevent them from being similarly deemed ineligible.

== Legacy ==
After Jaan's victory in 2000, five other hijras were elected in Madhya Pradesh within a year, mostly to local posts, such as a city councillor in Jabalpur, but with one, Shabnam Mausi, serving as a state legislator. In December 2000, three hijras were elected in the neighbouring state of Uttar Pradesh, including a mayor of Gorakhpur.

Jaan's election came near the beginning of a period of dissatisfaction with both the ruling Indian National Congress and the main opposition Bharatiya Janata Party. Over more than a decade, this spurred the success of outsiders, including the Aam Aadmi Party and hijra candidates. What began as "a creative way of expressing disdain" for the two main parties resulted in several hijras winning elections, especially in seats reserved by quotas for women and reserved castes.
