= LGBTQ rights in India =

- Area controlled by India shown in dark green; disputed regions shown in light green
- Legal status: Homosexuality legal since 2009–2013, again since 2018 (Navtej Singh Johar v. Union of India)
- Gender identity: a third gender (non-binary) is recognised. (National Legal Services Authority v. Union of India)
- Military: Openly homosexual people are banned
- Discrimination protections: Explicit gender identity protections and indirect constitutional protections for sexual orientation (see below)

Family rights
- Recognition of relationships: No recognition of same-sex unions
- Adoption: Adoption by single LGBT people is recognised, but not by same-sex couples

Lesbian, gay, bisexual, transgender and queer (LGBTQ) rights in India have expanded in the 21st century, although much of India's advancements on LGBT rights have come from the judiciary and not the legislature. LGBTQ people in India, face legal and social challenges not experienced by non-LGBTQ people. There are no legal restrictions on sex between men or between women. India does not currently provide for same-sex marriage, civil union or unregistered cohabitation.

The Transgender Persons (Protection of Rights) Act, 2019 recognises the right to self-perceived gender identity, and new identification documents confirming the change of gender can be issued by government agencies once a certificate is provided by a relevant medical official. Transgender citizens have a constitutional right to register themselves under a third gender.

Transgender activism in India has been academically mapped across four distinct waves from the 1980s to the present. While early identity formations were heavily situated within cosmogenic, mythological, and cultural narratives, modern activism has shifted toward demanding strict legal and institutional reform. Prominent activists such as Laxmi Narayan Tripathi, Shreegauri Sawant, and A. Revathi have highlighted that despite legislative milestones, lived realities are still dictated by systemic exclusion and a lack of proper policy execution at the state level, these systemic barriers have been termed as "implementational disenfranchisement" and "corrigible inequities."

Some states protect hijras, a traditional third gender population in South Asia through housing programmes, and offer welfare benefits, pension schemes, free operations in government hospitals as well as other programmes designed to assist them. The 2011 census recorded approximately 480,000 transgender people in India.

According to research in 2024, 79% of gay men and 44% of bisexual men have experienced verbal abuse or physical violence.

== History ==
There were no legal restrictions on homosexuality or transsexuality for the general population prior to early modern period and colonialism. However, certain moral codes forbade sexual misconduct (of both heterosexual and homosexual nature) among priests and monks, and religious codes of non-Hindu religions such as Christianity and Islam forbade homosexuality among their followers.

=== Hinduism ===
Hinduism describes a third gender that is equal to other genders, as documented in ancient Hindu and Buddhist medical texts. The term "third gender" is sometimes viewed as a specifically South Asian term, and this third gender is also found throughout South Asia and East Asia.

There are certain characters in the Mahabharata who, according to some versions of the epic, change genders, such as Shikhandi, who is sometimes said to be born as a female but identifies as male and eventually marries a woman. Bahuchara Mata is the goddess of fertility, worshipped by hijras as their patroness.

The Nāradasmṛti and the Sushruta Samhita, two important Sanskrit texts relating to dharma and medicine, respectively, declare homosexuality to be unchangeable and forbid homosexuals from marrying a partner of the opposite sex.

The Nāradasmṛti lists fourteen types of panda (men who are impotent with women); among these are the mukhebhaga (men who have oral sex with other men), the sevyaka (men who are sexually enjoyed by other men) and the irshyaka (the voyeur who watches other men engaging in sex).

The Kama Sutra, a Sanskrit text on human sexuality, uses the term tritiya-prakriti to define men with homosexual desires and describes their practices in great detail. Likewise, the Kama Sutra describes lesbians (svairini, who engage in aggressive lovemaking with other women), bisexuals (referred to as kami or paksha), transgender and intersex people.

Ancient Hindu gurus often offered social guidance, but this was not usually adopted in general law and custom, and often referred to conduct for the upper class of monks and priests, rather than for lay people. The Sushruta Samhita and the Charaka Samhita delve further into the issue of homosexuality, stating that homosexuals are conceived when the father's semen is scanty and transgender people are conceived when the father and mother reverse roles during intercourse (purushayita, "woman on top"). In the Manusmriti, there are proposals for various punishments for certain acts of homosexual and heterosexual sex. A mature woman having sex with a maiden girl was punished by having her head shaved or two fingers cut off, and was also made to ride on a donkey. The Manusmriti dictated that homosexual or heterosexual coupling in a bullock cart was a source of ritual pollution. Scholars doubt that Manusmitri law was implemented prior to colonialism, after which it became the basis of British colonial law for Hindus (parallel to Sharia Law for Muslims).

The Hindu Khajuraho temples, famous for their erotic sculptures, contain several depictions of homosexual activity. Historians have long argued that pre-colonial Indian society did not criminalise same-sex relationships, nor did it view such relations as immoral or sinful. Hinduism has traditionally portrayed homosexuality as natural and joyful, though some texts do contain injunctions against homosexuality specially among priests.

The Pali Canon of Buddhism, a legal code of conduct for sangha monks and nuns, forbade both homosexual and heterosexual relations, and required that acts of soft homosexual sex (such as masturbation and interfemoral sex) do not entail punishment but must be confessed to the superior. The Pali Canon was largely written in Sri Lanka but based on the teaching of Buddha in India.

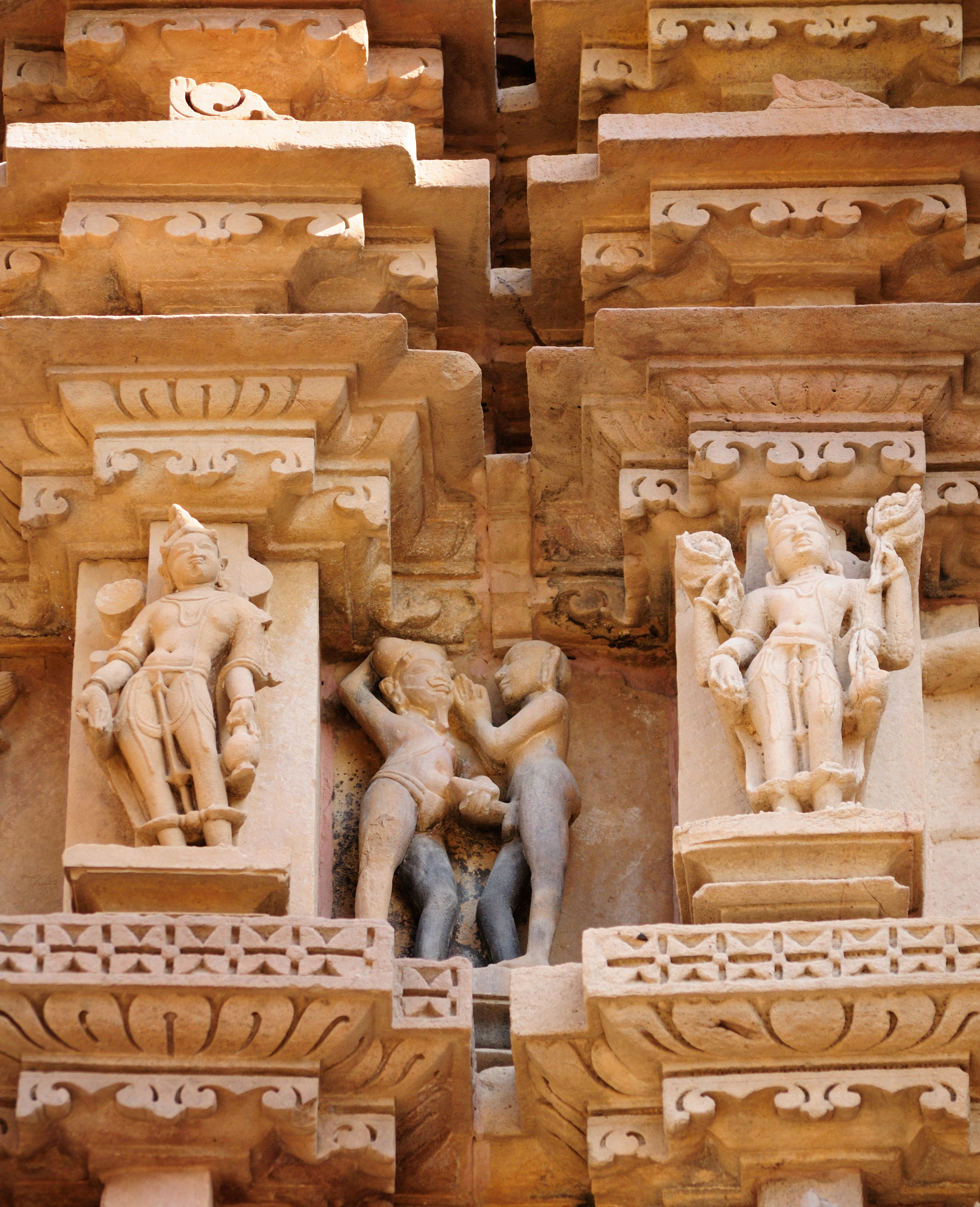
Erotic sculptures of two men (centre) at the Khajuraho monuments.

=== Mughal empire ===
The Mongol Empire under Genghis Khan imposed anti-homosexual law throughout the empire and introduced harsh discrimination against LGBTQ+ in much of Asia, including its derivatives such as Yuan China and the Mughal Empire.

During the Mughal Empire, a number of the pre-existing Delhi Sultanate laws were combined into the Fatawa-e-Alamgiri, mandating several types of punishments for homosexuality. These could include 50 lashes for a slave, 100 for a free infidel, or death by stoning for a Muslim.

=== British empire ===
The British Empire used sodomy laws to criminalise sexual activity between men, among other aims. The first of these was Mountstuart Elphinstone's 1827 sodomy law for Mumbai. The Goa Inquisition also once prosecuted the capital crime of sodomy in Portuguese India, but not lesbian activity.

Codification of criminalisation of homosexual activity across India was enacted by of Section 377 by the British, which stood for more than 70 years after Indian independence. The British Raj criminalised anal sex and oral sex (for both heterosexuals and homosexuals) under Section 377 of the Indian Penal Code, which entered into force in 1861, and made it an offence for a person to voluntarily have "carnal intercourse against the order of nature". Scholars have also argued that the original intention of Section 377 was to act as a means by which the British Raj could further police and control the body of the colonial subject. In colonial Victorian era morality, these subjects were seen as erotically perverse and in need of the imposition.

In 1884, a court in north India, ruling on the prosecution of a hijra, commented that a physical examination of the accused revealed she "had the marks of a habitual catamite" and commended the police's desire to "check these disgusting practices". In 1871, the British labeled the hijra population as a "criminal tribe".

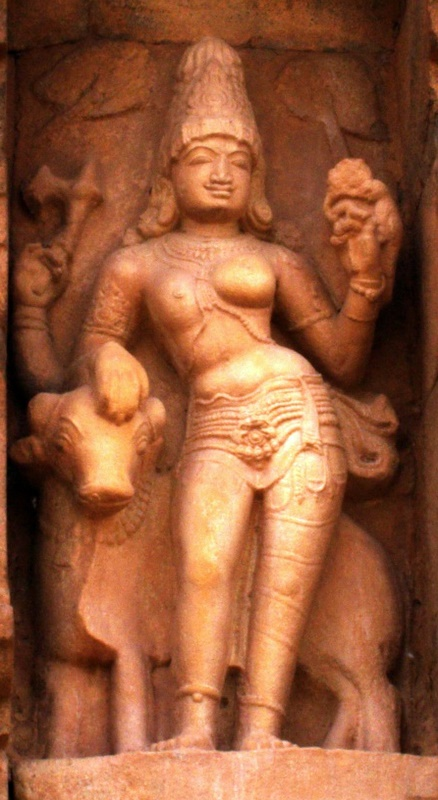
Ardhanarishvara in Gangaikonda Cholapuram

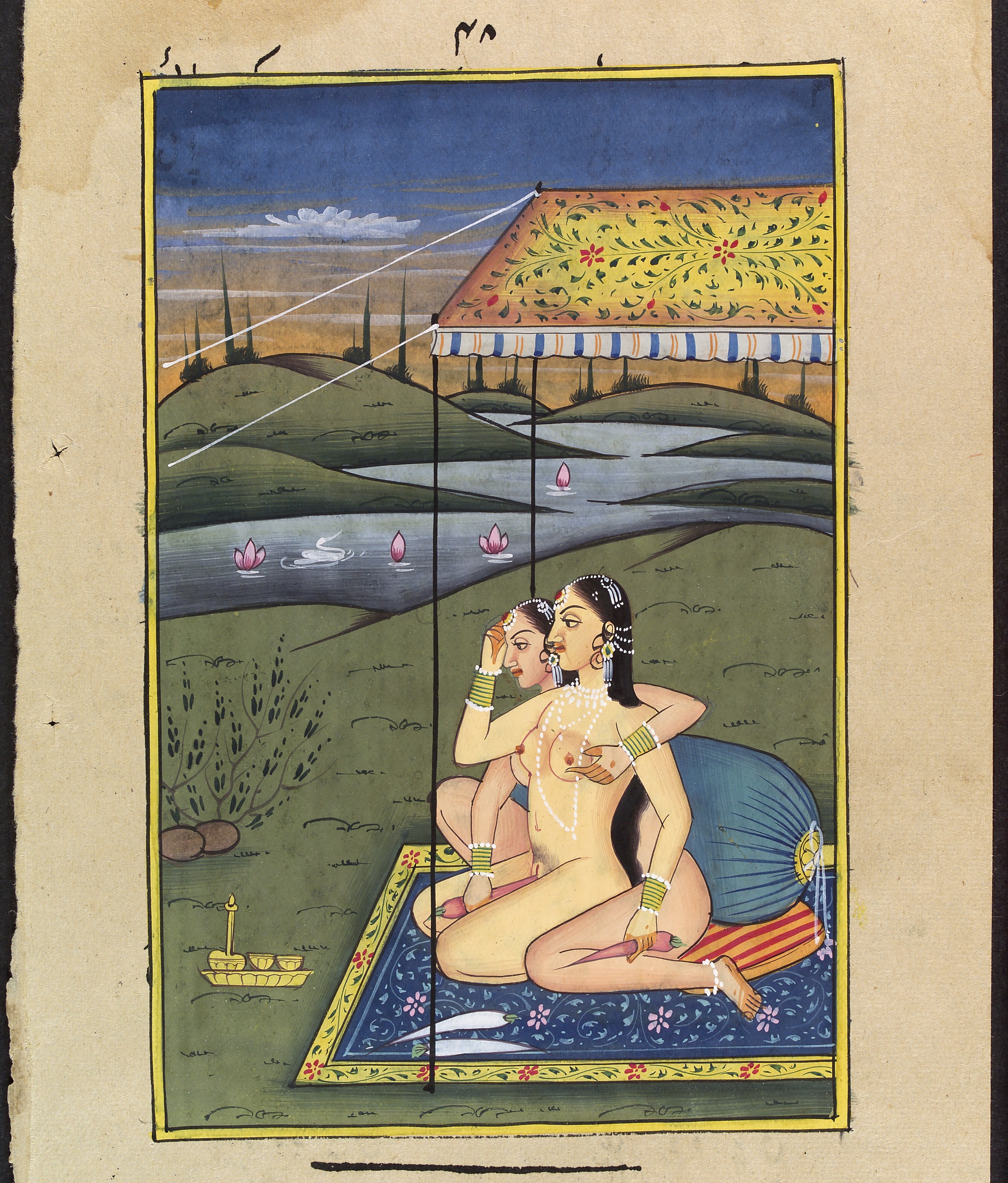
Two women using carrots as dildos, 20th century gouache painting.

=== Post independence ===
The Delhi High Court decision in Naz Foundation v. Govt. of NCT of Delhi of 2009 found Section 377 and other legal prohibitions against private, adult, consensual, and non-commercial same-sex conduct to be in direct violation of fundamental rights provided by the Indian Constitution. Section 377 stated that: "Whoever voluntarily has carnal intercourse against the order of nature with any man, woman or animal, shall be punished with [imprisonment for life], or with imprisonment of either description for a term which may extend to ten years, and shall also be liable to fine," with the added explanation that: "Penetration is sufficient to constitute the carnal intercourse necessary to the offence described in this section."

According to a previous ruling by the Indian Supreme Court, decisions of a high court on the constitutionality of a law apply throughout India, and not just to the state over which the high court in question has jurisdiction.

There have been incidents of harassment of LGBTQ groups by authorities under the law.

On 23 February 2012, the Ministry of Home Affairs expressed its opposition to the decriminalisation of homosexual activity, stating that in India, homosexuality is seen as being immoral. The Central Government reversed its stance on 28 February 2012, asserting that there was no legal error in decriminalising homosexual activity. The shift in stance resulted in two judges of the Supreme Court reprimanding the Central Government for frequently changing its approach to the issue.

Since 2012, 2 July has been celebrated as the Indian Coming Out Day to mark the 2009 Naz Foundation v. Govt. of NCT of Delhi judgment that decriminalised homosexual sexual activity.

On 11 December 2013 the Supreme Court set aside the 2009 Delhi High Court order decriminalising consensual homosexual activity within its jurisdiction.

Human Rights Watch expressed concerns that the Supreme Court ruling would render same-sex couples and individuals that had become open about their sexuality following the High Court's ruling vulnerable to police harassment and blackmail, stating that "the Supreme Court's ruling is a disappointing setback to human dignity, and the basic rights to privacy and non-discrimination" The Naz Foundation stated that it would file a petition for review of the court's decision. The activist group Kavi's Humsafar Trust have reported that two-fifths of homosexuals in the country had faced blackmail after the 2013 ruling.

On 28 January 2014 the Supreme Court of India dismissed the review petition filed by the Central Government, the Naz Foundation and several others against its 11 December verdict on Section 377. The bench explained the ruling by claiming that: "While reading down Section 377, the High Court overlooked that a minuscule fraction of the country's population constitutes lesbians, gays, bisexuals or transgender people, and in the more than 150 years past, less than 200 persons have been prosecuted for committing offence under Section 377, and this cannot be made a sound basis for declaring that Section ultra vires Articles 14, 15 and 21."

On 18 December 2015 Shashi Tharoor, a member of the Indian National Congress party, introduced a bill for the repeal of Section 377, but it was rejected in the House by a vote of 71–24.

On 2 February 2016 the Supreme Court decided to review the criminalisation of homosexual activity. In August 2017 the Supreme Court unanimously ruled that the right to individual privacy is an intrinsic and fundamental right under the Indian Constitution. The Court also ruled that a person's sexual orientation is a privacy issue, giving hopes to LGBTQ activists that the Court would soon strike down Section 377.

In January 2018 the Supreme Court agreed to refer the question of Section 377's validity to a large bench, and heard several petitions on 1 May 2018. In response to the court's request for its position on the petitions, the Government announced that it would not oppose the petitions, and would leave the case "to the wisdom of the court". A hearing began on 10 July 2018, with a verdict expected before October 2018. Activists view the case as the most significant and "greatest breakthrough for gay rights since the country's independence", and it could have far-reaching implications for other Commonwealth countries that still outlaw homosexuality.

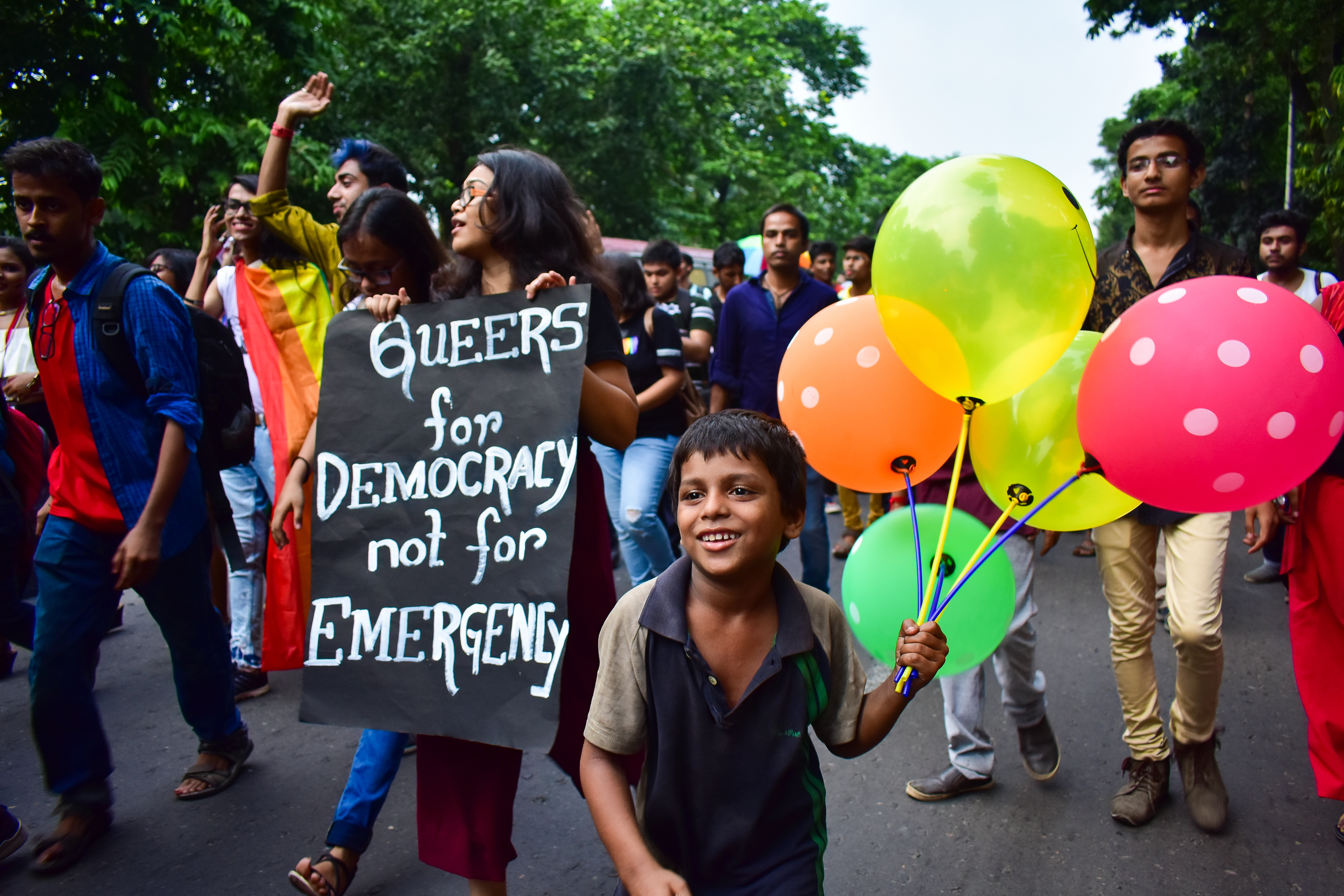
2018 Kolkata march on the occasion of the Supreme Court ruling

On 6 September 2018 the Supreme Court issued its verdict. The Court unanimously ruled that Section 377 is unconstitutional as it infringed on the fundamental rights of autonomy, intimacy and identity, thus legalising homosexuality in India. The Court explicitly overturned its 2013 judgment.

Criminalising carnal intercourse is irrational, arbitrary and manifestly unconstitutional.

— Chief Justice Dipak Misra

History owes an apology to these people and their families. Homosexuality is part of human sexuality. They have the right of dignity and free of discrimination. Consensual sexual acts of adults are allowed for [the] LGBT community.

— Justice Indu Malhotra

It is difficult to right a wrong by history. But we can set the course for the future. This case involves much more than decriminalizing homosexuality. It is about people wanting to live with dignity.

— Justice Dhananjaya Y. Chandrachud

Furthermore, it ruled that any discrimination on the basis of sexual orientation is a violation of the Indian Constitution:

Sexual orientation is one of the many biological phenomena which is natural and inherent in an individual and is controlled by neurological and biological factors. The science of sexuality has theorized that an individual exerts little or no control over who he/she gets attracted to. Any discrimination on the basis of one's sexual orientation would entail a violation of the fundamental right of freedom of expression.

The Supreme Court also directed the Government to take all measures to properly broadcast the fact that homosexuality is not a criminal offence, to create public awareness and eliminate the stigma members of the LGBTQ community face, and to give the police force periodic training to sensitise them about the issue.

The judgement also included an inbuilt safeguard to ensure that it cannot be revoked again under the "Doctrine of Progressive Realisation of Rights".

Legal experts have urged the Government to pass legislation reflecting the decision, and frame laws to allow same-sex marriage, adoption by same-sex couples and inheritance rights.

Non-consensual sex (rape) and bestiality remain criminal offences. Initially, it was unknown whether the Supreme Court ruling extended to the former state of Jammu and Kashmir, which was governed by its own criminal law, the Ranbir Penal Code (RPC). Legal opinion was divided on whether the Supreme Court judgment applied to the state or not. Per a 1995 judgment of the state High Court, when an IPC (Indian Penal Code) provision is struck down on grounds of violating the Constitution, its corresponding provision in the Ranbir Penal Code too would be struck down. On 31 October 2019 the state was split into the union territories of Jammu and Kashmir and Ladakh, which apply the IPC. The RPC was abolished.

In September 2021 the Chennai-based Madras High Court, which has jurisdiction over Tamil Nadu, ruled that queerphobia was rampant in medical education and directed the medical institutions and police to revamp their services to support LGBTQ individuals.

On 10 April 2022 the Madras High Court directed Tamil Nadu Government to conduct sensitisation of school teachers on LGBTQ issues. The court also recommended a glossary or style-sheet to be used by Media for writing about LGBTQ community. The court asked the Tamil Nadu Government to adopt the glossary developed by community members till a time it can come up with its own version.

In the early weeks of January 2023 the leader of the highly influential Hindu group called RSS, often labelled as a far-right organisation that provides grassroots support for the ruling BJP, backed LGBTQ rights and stated that LGBTQ rights were supported in the native Hindu culture and history. However, it stopped short of recognizing the right to civil registration of same-sex relationships.

In April 2024, as per the direction of the Supreme Court in the Supriyo verdict, the Modi government established a six-person commission to evaluate and receive feedback on the needs of the LGBTQ community at the federal level. Headed by the Cabinet Secretary, the commission comprises the Secretaries of the Ministry of Home Affairs, Ministry of Social Justice and Empowerment, Ministry of Law and Justice, Ministry of Women and Child Development and the Ministry of Health and Family Welfare.

The ruling government of the BJP/NDA's position on recognition of same-sex relationships is to address the "human concerns" about same-sex couples within the context of Hinduism while opposing any form of civil unions. Two government sources stated that the recognition of same-sex relationships would require backing from all religious groups in India.

On 28 August 2024, the Ministry of Finance issued an advisory declaring that persons from the LGBTQ community face no restrictions in opening joint bank accounts or nominating their partners as beneficiaries.

== Recognition of same-sex relationships ==
India provides some legal recognition of homosexual partnerships as live-in relationships and cohabitation is legal as per the judiciary. It does not provide for legal marriages, common law marriages or civil unions, though same-sex couples can obtain rights and benefits as a live-in couple as per Supreme Court of India landmark decision Deepika Singh v. Central Administrative Tribunal in August 2022. There are number of companies that provide services to homosexuals in live-in relationships such as financial services and healthcare services.

Hinduism traditionally believed that there is no role for the state in marriage and that it was a private/societal issue to be dealt with locally. Marriage was codified into the legal system through the Hindu Marriage Law by the British Raj, though this was not a perfect interpretation of the original marriages conducted before that time and was to deal with divorce proceedings, and the colonial laws only allowed for heterosexual marriages to be performed. Despite the legal requirement to register a marriage with the government, the vast majority of Hindu marriages are not registered with government and are instead conducted through unwritten common law.

Several same-sex couples have married in traditional Hindu ceremonies; however, these marriages were not able to be registered and couples do not attain any rights and benefits as heterosexual married couples.

Buddhism considers marriage to be a secular issue or a social contract, and therefore not a religious matter. There is no official marriage service and marriage customs are often adopted from local cultural traditions, for example with Andi Fian arguing that prohibitions against homosexual marriage in Confucianism may have influenced Chinese Buddhism.

A two-judge bench of the Supreme Court of India in August 2022, while giving a ruling on an unrelated matter (maternity leave), made a non-binding observation that the definition of a family unit includes opposite-sex and same-sex live-in relationships, declaring them equally entitled to social welfare benefits.

On 17 October 2023 the Supreme Court of India unanimously voted against the legalisation of same-sex marriage, but reiterated the rights of LGBTQ citizens under the constitution and empowered parliament or state legislatures to enact their own laws to "meet challenges" faced by the LGBTQ community and regulate rights.

The ruling government of the BJP/NDA's position on recognition of same-sex relationships is to address the "human concerns" about same-sex couples within the context of Hinduism by providing equal financial and legal rights. The sources stated that the recognition of same-sex marriage would require the backing from all religious groups.

=== Case law ===
In 2011 a Haryana court granted legal recognition to a same-sex marriage involving two women. After marrying, the couple began to receive threats from friends and relatives in their village. The couple eventually won family approval.

Their lawyer said the court had served notice on 14 of Veena's relatives and villagers who had threatened them with "dire consequences". Haryana has been the centre of widespread protests by villagers who believe their village councils or khaps should be allowed to impose their own punishments on those who disobey their rulings or break local traditions – mainly honour killings of those who marry within their own gotra or sub-caste, regarded in the state as akin to incest. Deputy Commissioner of Police Dr. Abhe Singh told The Daily Telegraph: "The couple has been shifted to a safe house and we have provided adequate security to them on the court orders. The security is provided on the basis of threat perception and in this case the couple feared that their families might be against the relationship."

On 12 June 2020 the Uttarakhand High Court acknowledged that while same-sex marriage may not be legal, cohabitation and "live-in relationships" are protected by the law. A ruling by the Supreme Court of India in 2022 widened the definition of families to live-in couples inclusive of LGBT, thereby providing LGBTQ couples rights and benefits equal to that of married couples. The Madras High Court in 2023 suggested to the Tamil Nadu government to consider adopting a "deed of familial association" for recognising same-sex relationships.

==== Supriyo v. Union of India ====
On 25 November 2022 the Supreme Court of India agreed to hear the case that could legalise same-sex marriage as the nine petitions pending before the Kerala and Delhi High Courts are transferred to the Supreme Court for a uniform ruling. The matter is scheduled to be heard by the Supreme Court on 13 March 2023.

On 19 December 2022 Sushil Modi, a prominent BJP lawmaker, told Parliament that "India is the country of 1.4 billion people and two judges cannot just sit in a room and decide on such a socially significant subject. Instead, there should be a debate in Parliament as well as the society at large" he added.

On 14 March 2023, during the press conference at the end of Akhil Bharatiya Pratinidhi Sabha, RSS General Secretary Dattatreya Hosabale backed the BJP-led Union Government's opposition to the extension of the right to marry for same-sex couples. He said marriage is an institution for the benefit of the family and society, not for physical and sexual enjoyment.

On 24 March 2023 a group of 21 retired judges of various High Courts have issued an open letter stating that legalisation of same-sex marriage will change the entire gamut of all personal laws from marriage to adoption and succession. The law-making power is vested with the Parliament and not with the judiciary, especially in matters exclusively within social and political domain, the judges have mentioned. The letter also noted, "Instead of having wide-range discussions amongst stakeholders, such a hasty judicial intervention is unfortunate, and totally unwarranted. The court should not interfere in sensitive issues like same-sex marriage. The subject is related to society and the opinion of society on these matters is important. Parliament is paramount in making laws and the MPs elected to Parliament represent the people of the country." retired Justice of High Court of Delhi added.

On 1 April 2023 Mahmood Asad Madani representing the Islamic organisation Jamiat Ulema-e-Hind sought to intervene as an opponent to legalising same-sex marriage in India. Several other Islamic organisations including Jamaat-e-Islami Hind, All India Muslim Personal Law Board, and Telangana Markazi Shia Ulema Council also voiced their opposition to legalising same-sex marriage.

Oral arguments began on 18 April 2023. During the hearings Solicitor General Tushar Mehta, who represented the government, noted that five individuals should not decide for the entire nation and issues related to human relationships, such as marriage, should be addressed by parliament. The Chief Justice Dhananjaya Yashwant Chandrachuda responded: "There is no absolute concept of a man or a woman at all. You can't tell us what to do. I won't allow this in my court".

On 20 April 2023 a five-judge Constitution bench led by Chief Justice D. Y. Chandrachud hinted at their intention to legalise same-sex marriage, despite objections by the Indian government and religious groups.

On 21 April 2023 Bhupender Yadav, an influential Minister and the National General Secretary of the ruling BJP, stated that "the issue of marriage concerns society and society's opinion on this issue cannot be excluded. The voice of society is best reflected in Parliament".

Kanav Sahgal, who works for the Vidhi Center for Legal Policy, noted that "homosexuality is not perceived very well in large parts of India. No matter what is decided by the Supreme Court, India's majority does not support the legalisation of same-sex marriage".

The State Governments of Andhra Pradesh, Assam, Gujarat, Madhya Pradesh and Rajasthan have opposed the legal recognition of same-sex marriages and not a single Indian State Government has expressed support for same-sex marriage.

=== Legislation ===
In October 2017 a group of citizens proposed a draft of a new Uniform Civil Code that would legalise same-sex marriage to the Law Commission of India.

It defines marriage as "the legal union as prescribed under this Act of a man with a woman, a man with another man, a woman with another woman, a transgender with another transgender, or a transgender with a man or a woman. All married couples in partnership entitled to adopt a child. Sexual orientation of the married couple or the partners not to be a bar to their right to adoption. Non-heterosexual couples will be equally entitled to adopt a child".

On 1 April 2022, MP Supriya Sule introduced a private member's bill to legalise same-sex marriages under the Special Marriage Act, 1954.

== Discrimination protections ==
Article 15 of the Constitution of India states that:

15. Prohibition of discrimination on grounds of religion, race, caste, sex or place of birth

(1) The State shall not discriminate against any citizen on grounds only of religion, race, caste, sex, place of birth or any of them
(2) No citizen shall, on grounds only of religion, race, caste, sex, place of birth or any of them, be subject to any disability, liability, restriction or condition with regard to

(a) access to shops, public restaurants, hotels and places of public entertainment; or
(b) the use of wells, tanks, bathing ghats, roads and places of public resort maintained wholly or partly out of State funds or dedicated to the use of the general public

In the case of Navtej Singh Johar v. Union of India, the Supreme Court ruled that the Indian Constitution bans discrimination based on sexual orientation via the category of "sex". Similarly in the case of National Legal Services Authority v. Union of India, the Supreme Court held that discrimination on the basis of gender identity is constitutionally prohibited.

Transgender women helping police in Maharashtra

Gender identity, in our view, is an integral part of sex and no citizen can be discriminated on the ground of gender identity, including those who identify as third gender. We, therefore, conclude that discrimination on the basis of sexual orientation or gender identity includes any discrimination, exclusion, restriction or preference, which has the effect of nullifying or transposing equality by the law or the equal protection of laws guaranteed under our Constitution. (p. 73)

— Supreme Court Judge K. S. Panicker Radhakrishnan

Sex as it occurs in Article 15, is not merely restricted to the biological attributes of an individual, but also includes their "sexual identity and character".

— Supreme Court of India

Despite these constitutional interpretations, no legislative law has been enacted to ban discrimination on the basis of sexual orientation in employment since Article 15 only extended to discrimination from the state or government bodies. However, on 4 February 2021 the Allahabad High Court ruled that firing and discriminating against a person in employment on the basis of sexual orientation is a violation of Navtej Singh Johar v. Union of India ruling of the Supreme Court, hence extending the anti-discriminatory provisions to employment everywhere. In case of physical attacks against LGBTQ people, Section 307 (Attempt to murder) or Section 323 (voluntarily causing hurt) of the Indian Penal Code is used against the perpetrator. In case of hate speech, Section 153 A (Hate Speech Law) of the code has been previously used. The Allahabad High Court in a landmark decision in Sultana Mirza v. State of Uttar Pradesh stated that a Constitutional Court has a duty to monitor and observe the constitutional morality as well as the rights of the citizens which are under threat only on account of the sexual orientation. In August 2018, the National Human Rights Commission of India set up the LGBTI core group and appointed openly gay politician Harish Iyer in its 15 members committee in a bid to enforce human rights related legislations pertaining to LGBTQ people and counter discrimination.

Adopted in 2019, the Transgender Persons (Protection of Rights) Act, 2019 bans discrimination against transgender people in educational establishment and services, employment, healthcare services, access to the "use of any goods, accommodation, service, facility, benefit, privilege or opportunity dedicated to the use of the general public or customarily available to the public", the right to movement, the right to "reside, purchase, rent or otherwise occupy any property", the opportunity to stand for or hold public or private office, and in government or private establishments.

There have been reservations among some in the transgender community, both regarding the difficulty of obtaining a certificate, and because of lack of awareness and lack of sensitivity to the issue among local public officials. LGBTQ protests against the bill have occurred, with claims that the bill hurts the transgender community instead of helping it. Protesters noted the provision for certification, but criticised the fact that this would require people to register with the government in order to be recognised as transgender. They also criticised the inequality inherent in the vast differences in punishment for the same crime, such as sexual abuse, committed against violating a transgender or cisgender individual.

LGBTQ activists are encouraging people who have faced discrimination because of their sexual orientation or gender identity in other non-state areas to mount challenges in court, seeking to test the jurisprudence set by the two rulings.

=== Discrimination and bullying in higher education ===
Discrimination, bullying and ragging targeted at a student on the ground of their sexual orientation or gender identity is prohibited under the UGC Regulation on Curbing the Menace of Ragging in Higher Educational Institutions (Third Amendment), 2016.

=== Military service ===
LGBTQ people are banned from openly serving in the Indian Armed Forces. In late December 2018, Member of Parliament Jagdambika Pal (BJP) introduced a bill to the Indian Parliament to amend the Army Act, 1950, the Navy Act, 1957 and the Air Force Act, 1950 that would allow LGBTQ people to serve in the Armed Forces. The bill was lapsed in the Lok Sabha.

=== Incidents ===
The actor Kamaal R. Khan was processed by the police on 9 December 2018 for making obscene comments against the LGBTQ community.

== Transgender rights ==
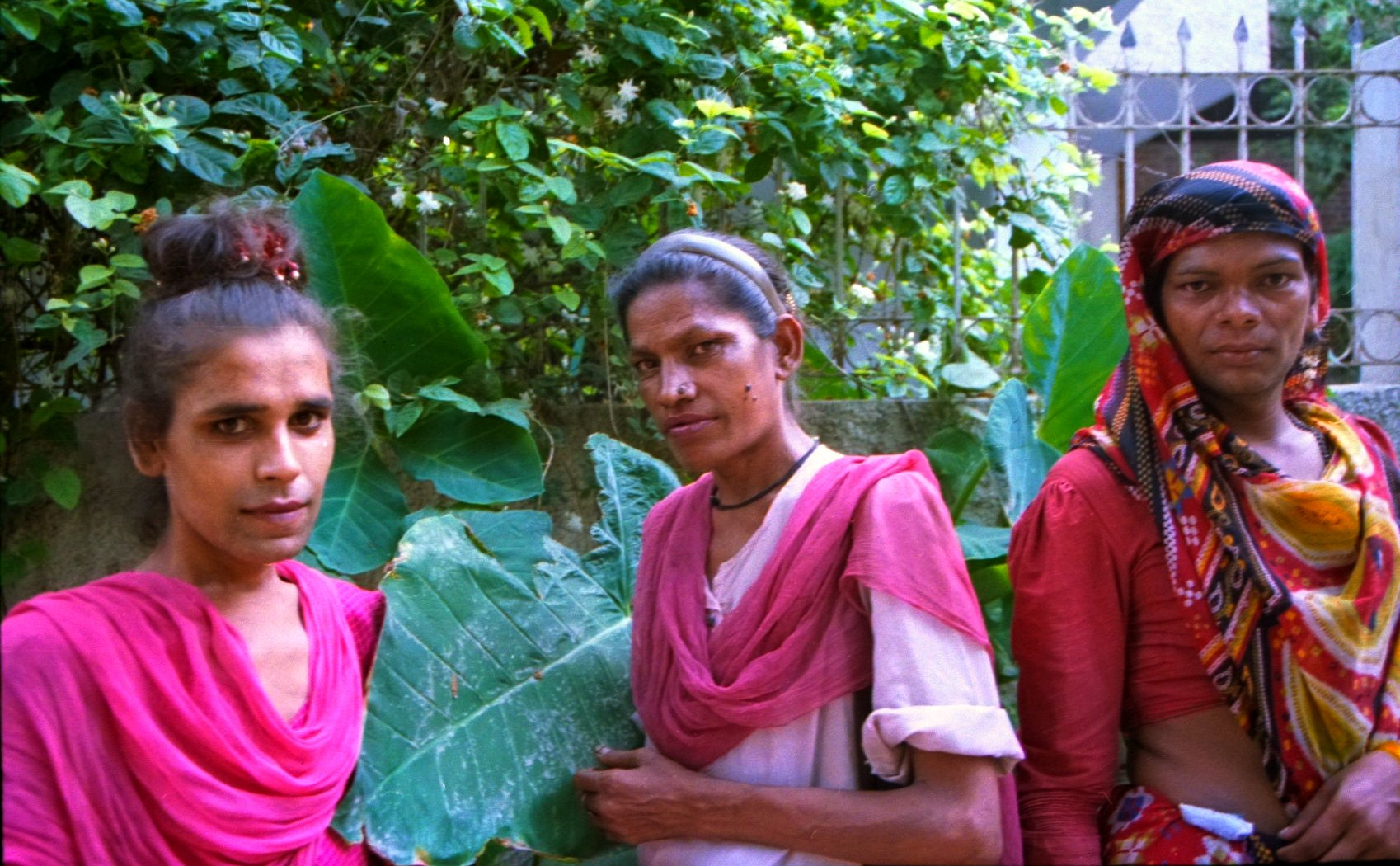
Three hijras in New Delhi

India has traditionally recognised a third gender population, considered by society as neither male or female. Such individuals are known as hijras or alternatively hijaḍaas. In English-language publications, these terms are given to eunuchs, intersex people, or transgender people.

Hijras were legally granted voting rights as a third sex in 1994. Due to alleged legal ambiguity of the procedure, Indian transgender individuals have difficulties accessing safe medical facilities for surgery. On 15 April 2014 the Supreme Court of India declared transgender people a socially and economically suppressed class entitled to reservations in education and jobs, and also directed union and state governments to frame welfare schemes for them. The Court ruled that transgender people have a fundamental constitutional right to change their gender without any sort of surgery, and called on the Union Government to ensure equal treatment for transgender people. The Court also ruled that the Indian Constitution mandates the recognition of a third gender on official documents, and that Article 15 bans discrimination based on gender identity. In light of the ruling, government documents, such as voter ID cards, passports and bank forms, have started providing a third gender option alongside male (M) and female (F), usually designated as "other" (O), "third gender" (TG) or "transgender" (T).

In 2013 the transgender and gender activists S. Swapna and Gopi Shankar Madurai from Srishti Madurai staged a protest in the Madurai collectorate on 7 October 2013 demanding reservation and to permit alternate genders to appear for examinations conducted by TNPSC, UPSC, SSC and Bank exams. Swapna, incidentally, had successfully moved the Madras High Court in 2013 seeking permission to write the TNPSC Group II exam as a female candidate. Swapna is the first transgender person to clear TNPSC Group IV exams.

On 24 April 2015 the Rajya Sabha unanimously passed the Rights of Transgender Persons Bill, 2014 guaranteeing rights and entitlements, reservations in education and jobs (2% reservation in government jobs), legal aid, pensions, unemployment allowances and skill development for transgender people. It also contained provisions to prohibit discrimination in employment as well as prevent abuse, violence and exploitation of transgender people. The bill also provided for the establishment of welfare boards at the centre and state level as well as for transgender rights courts. The bill was introduced by DMK MP Tiruchi Siva, and marked the first time the upper house had passed a private member's bill in 45 years. However, the bill contained several anomalies and a lack of clarity on how various ministries would coordinate to implement its provisions. The bill was never brought to a vote in the lower house.

Social Justice and Empowerment Minister Thaawar Chand Gehlot stated on 11 June 2015 that the Union Government would introduce a new comprehensive bill for transgender rights in the Monsoon session of Parliament. The bill would be based on the study on transgender issues conducted by a committee appointed on 27 January 2014. According to Gehlot, the Government sought to provide transgender people with all rights and entitlements currently enjoyed by scheduled castes and scheduled tribes.

The Transgender Persons (Protection of Rights) Bill, 2016, which was initially introduced to Parliament in August 2016, was re-introduced to Parliament in late 2017. Some transgender activists have opposed the bill because it does not address issues such as marriage, adoption and divorce for transgender people. Akkai Padmashali criticised the bill's definition of transness, which states that transgender people are "based on the underlying assumption of biological determinism". The bill passed the Lok Sabha on 17 December 2018 with 27 amendments, including a controversial clause prohibiting transgender people from begging. The bill was sent to a parliamentary committee, but lapsed with the dissolution of the 16th Lok Sabha.

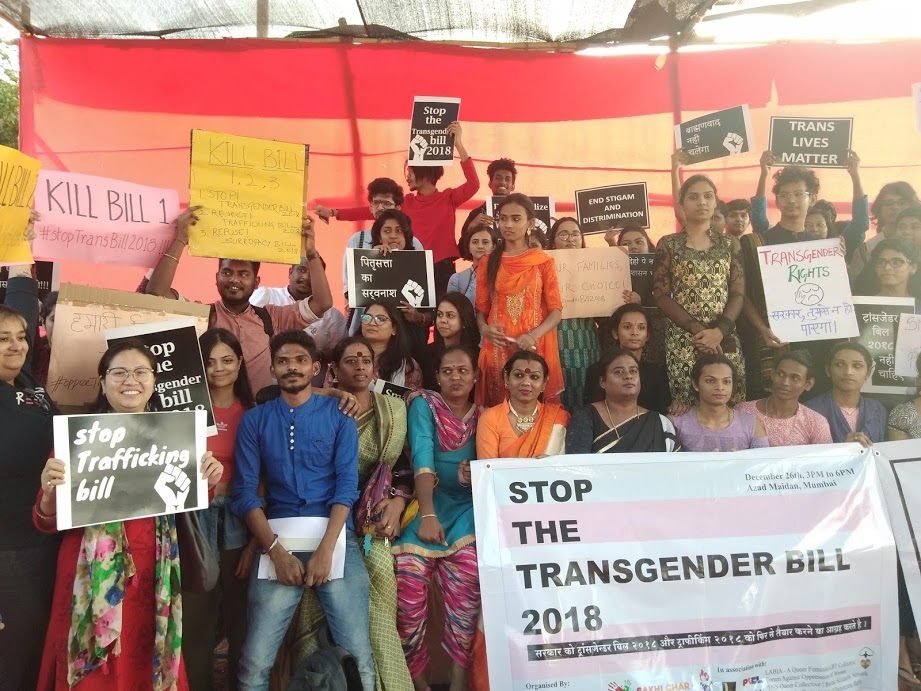
Members of the transgender community protest against the 2019 transgender bill in Mumbai, December 2018.

A government bill, the Transgender Persons (Protection of Rights) Bill, 2019, was reintroduced to Parliament after the 2019 general election. The bill was approved on 10 July by the Cabinet of India. The bill defines transgender persons as those "whose gender does not match the gender assigned to that person at birth and includes trans-men or trans-women, persons with intersex variations, gender-queers, and persons having socio-cultural identities such as kinnar, hijras, aravani and jogta". A person would have the right to choose to be identified as male, female or "transgender". However, transgender people are required to go to a district magistrate to have their gender identity certified, and require proof of any medical intervention, such as hormone replacement therapy, psychotherapy or gender reassignment surgery, if they are seeking to be identified as male or female. This mechanism is separate for passport changes, which require a certificate of surgery.

The bill prohibits discrimination against transgender people in nine fields, such as education, employment and healthcare. However, transgender activists criticised that the bill is silent on a real remedy or mechanism to integrate transgender people into public spaces and improve the quality of their lives, or on how the State intends to enforce this, or about what the State will do, if and when such discrimination does occur. The bill was also criticised for not taking into account any of the suggestions made by transgender activists; namely that it only provides for transgender persons to receive identity certificates recognising them as "transgender" and therefore, excludes other gender identities. Although it includes terms such as "trans-men", "trans-women", "persons with intersex variations" and "gender-queers" in its definition of transgender persons, these terms are not defined.

The bill aims to set up a "National Council for Transgender" that would comprise a host of government and community representatives, and is meant to advise the Union Government on formulation of policies with respect to transgender persons, monitor and evaluate the impact of said policies, coordinate the activities of all departments dealing with these matters and redress the grievances of transgender persons. A controversial clause that would have criminalised begging by transgender people was removed from the bill. Another controversial clause that would have made transgender people subject themselves to certification by a district screening committee to be acknowledged as transgender was also struck out. The legislation received further criticism concerning the issue of sexual assault; it provides for maximum two years' imprisonment for sexually assaulting a transgender person, whereas the minimum penalty for raping a cisgender woman is 10 years. The bill was passed by the Lok Sabha on 5 August 2019 by a voice vote, and by the Rajya Sabha on 25 November 2019. It was signed into law by President Ram Nath Kovind on 5 December, becoming the Transgender Persons (Protection of Rights) Act, 2019.

On 22 April 2019 the Madras High Court, the high court of Tamil Nadu, ruled that the term "bride" under the Hindu Marriage Act, 1955 includes trans women. Specifically, it directed the authorities to register a marriage between a man and a transgender woman.

On the eve of the 2024 Indian general election, the ruling party of the BJP expanded the coverage of the Ayushman Bharat scheme in order to cover all members of the LGBTQ community.

In 2026, the Modi government passed the Transgender Persons (Protection of Rights) Amendment Bill, 2026, which removes a transgender person's right to determine their own gender and proposes a medical board examination to determine one's gender.

The amendment retains specific sociocultural identities, such as aravani, hijra or kinner, and adds the identity of eunuch, as valid classes of transgender persons. It also adds a class of transgender persons who were forced by coercion to assume a transgender identity as valid under the protections of the bill. It furthermore removes explicit identification of trans women and trans men outside of these identities, and adds the surgical requirement as a prerequisite of document updates.

The bill was opposed by opposition MPs. MPs from the INC, the DMK, NCP, Shiv Sena (UBT), RJD, SP and AITC held a walkout during the voice vote of this bill in the Lok Sabha.

=== State laws ===
The states of Tamil Nadu and Kerala were the first Indian states to introduce a transgender welfare policy. According to the policy, transgender people can access free sex reassignment surgery in government hospitals (only for male-to-female), free housing, various citizenship documents, admission in government colleges with full scholarship for higher studies, alternative sources of livelihood through formation of self-help groups (for savings) and initiating income-generation programmes (IGP). Tamil Nadu was also the first state to form a transgender welfare board with representatives from the transgender community. Kerala started providing free surgery in government hospitals in 2016.

The state of West Bengal set up a transgender welfare board in 2015 to coordinate all policy decisions and development work pertaining to the transgender population in the state. The board, however, has been labelled an "all-around failure" by several transgender activists. Supposed to meet once every month with representatives from numerous state government departments, the board has only met five times as of July 2017.

In July 2016 the state of Odisha enacted welfare benefits for transgender people, giving them the same benefits as those living below the poverty line. This was aimed at improving their overall social and economic status, according to the Odisha Department of Social Security.

The Government of Himachal Pradesh has set up medical boards at the district and state level for assisting transgender people. The state has also enacted various schemes providing pension, skill development, scholarship and financial support for parents of transgender people.

In April 2017 the Ministry of Drinking Water and Sanitation instructed states to allow transgender people to use the public toilet of their choice.

A transgender board was established in Chandigarh on 22 August 2017. The board comprises members from the police department, the social welfare department, the education department and the law department, health professionals, and representatives of Panjab University, and others.

In October 2017 the Karnataka Government issued the "State Policy for Transgenders, 2017", with the aim of raising awareness of transgender people within all educational institutions in the state. Educational institutions will address issues of violence, abuse and discrimination against transgender people. It also established a monitoring committee designed with investigating reports of discrimination.

On 28 November 2017 N. Chandrababu Naidu, the Chief Minister of Andhra Pradesh, announced the enactment of pension plans for transgender people. On 16 December 2017 the Andhra Cabinet passed the policy. According to the policy, the State Government will provide an amount of ₹1,500 per month to each transgender person above the age of 18 for social security pensions. The Government will also construct special toilets in public places, such as malls and cinema halls, for transgender people. In addition, the state has also established a transgender welfare board.

In January 2018 the Kashmiri Finance Minister introduced a proposal to the Jammu and Kashmir Legislative Assembly that would grant transgender people free life and medical insurance, and a monthly sustenance pension for those aged 60+ and registered with the Social Welfare Department. Transgender activists have criticised aspects of the bill, including its requirement to establish medical boards to issue "transgender certificates".

The Government of Delhi announced its intention in May 2018 to establish a seven-member committee to review issues surrounding the transgender community, including concerns of sexual abuse, discrimination at work as well as other societal problems. "We will have a dedicated cell for transgender people, which will be headed by a representative from the community. The commission receives a lot of complaints of abuse against them. The cell will enable us to focus on issues faced by [transgender people] and providing members greater support and safety.", said Swati Maliwal, chief of the Delhi Commission for Women.

In July 2018 the Rajasthan Transgender Welfare Board (RTWB) announced it would begin issuing "multi-purpose identity cards" to about 75,000 transgender people in the state to help them access government schemes and benefits.

The Uttarakhand High Court directed the State Government in late September 2018 to provide reservation for transgender people in educational institutions, and to frame social welfare programmes for the betterment of transgender people.

In early 2019 the Social Welfare Department of Assam published a draft "transgender policy" with numerous objectives, including providing transgender people access to educational institutions, providing shelter and sanitation for the homeless, raising awareness, and issuing self-identification identity cards. The All Assam Transgender Association has criticised certain aspects of the policy, namely its definition of the term "transgender".

In February 2019 the Maharashtra Government set up a "Transgender Welfare Board" to conduct health programmes and provide formal education and employment opportunities to transgender people. The board provides skill development programmes to help transgender people find a job and free accommodation for those seeking scholarships. A similar board was also set up in the neighbouring state of Gujarat that same month. The Gujarat board provides various welfare programmes for employment and education, and coordinates with state departments to ensure that the transgender community is able to take advantage of government schemes. An educational campaign was also established in order to sensitise the public.

In July 2019 the Bihar Government announced the creation of a transgender welfare board, which would investigate and report on social and legal challenges faced by transgender people in the state and provide financial assistance of up to ₹150,000 for sex reassignment surgery. In addition, those who refuse house on rent or medical facilities to transgender individuals would be eligible for imprisonment ranging between six months to two years.

In August 2019 the state of Madhya Pradesh announced its intention to set up a welfare board for the transgender community in the near future. Issues will include a monthly allowance to parents of intersex children, provisions for job reservations for transgender persons in government and separate public toilets.

=== Third gender literature and studies ===
Vaadamalli by the novelist Su. Samuthiram is the first Tamil novel about the local aravani community in Tamil Nadu, published in 1994. The transgender activist A. Revathi became the first hijra to write about hijra issues and gender politics in Tamil. Her works have been translated into more than eight languages and act as a primary resource on gender studies in Asia. Her book is part of a research project for more than 100 universities. She is the author of Unarvum Uruvamum ("Feelings and Form"), the first of its kind in English from a member of the hijra community. She also acted and directed several stage plays on gender and sexuality issues in Tamil and Kannada. The Truth about Me: A Hijra Life Story by A. Revathi is part of the syllabus for final year students of American College, Madurai. The American College is the first college in India to introduce third gender literature and studies with research-oriented seminars. Naan Saravanan's Alla (2007) and Vidya's I Am Vidya (2008) were among early trans woman autobiographies. Kalki Subramaniam's Kuri Aruthean ("Phallus, I cut") is a collection of Tamil poems about transgender lives.

The American College in Madurai also introduced Maraikappatta Pakkangal ("Hidden Pages") as a course book for "Genderqueer and Intersex Human Rights studies" as part of the curriculum for Tamil and English department students in 2018. It is the first book on the LGBTQ community in the Tamil language, launched by Gopi Shankar Madurai and state BJP leader Vanathi Srinivasan in 2014.

== Conversion therapy ==
In February 2014 the Indian Psychiatric Society (IPS) issued a statement in which it stated that there is no evidence to prove that homosexuality is unnatural: "Based on existing scientific evidence and good practice guidelines from the field of psychiatry, the Indian Psychiatric Society would like to state that there is no evidence to substantiate the belief that homosexuality is a mental illness or a disease." In June 2018, IPS reiterated its stance on homosexuality saying: "Certain people are not cut out to be heterosexual and we don't need to castigate them, we don't need to punish them, to ostracise them".

Despite this statement from the IPS, conversion therapy is still performed in India. These practices usually involve electroconvulsive therapy (which may lead to memory loss), hypnosis, the administration of nausea-inducing drugs, or more commonly talk therapy where the individual is told that homosexuality is caused by "insufficient male affirmation in childhood" or "an uncaring father and an overbearing mother". Conversion therapy can lead to depression, anxiety, seizures, drug use and suicidal tendencies for the individuals involved.

In 2022 the National Medical Commission banned the practice of 'conversion therapy'.

=== S Sushma v. Commissioner of Police ===
On 28 April 2021 Madras High Court Justice N Anand Venkatesh passed interim orders in response to a petition filed by two young women with same-sex orientation. In an unprecedented move, he decided to undergo psycho-education before penning a judgment on same-sex relationships.

Ignorance is no justification for normalizing any form of discrimination

— Justice N Anand Venkatesh, Page number 49 out of 104

Justice N Anand Venkatesh said that psycho-educative counseling on queer issues helped him shed his personal ignorance and prejudices. He clearly stated in the judgment that the responsibility to change, the burden of unlearning stigma, and learning about the lived experience of the LGBTQ people lies on the society and not the queer individuals.

It was I (us), who has to set off on a journey of understanding them and accepting them and shed our notions, and not they who have to turn themselves inside out to suit our notions of social morality and tradition

— Justice N Anand Venkatesh, Page number 50 out of 104

The court recognised that there is an absence of a specific law to protect the interests of queer people and acknowledged it is the responsibility of the constitutional courts to fill this vacuum with necessary directions to ensure the protection of same-sex couples from harassment sourced from stigma and prejudices.

Till the legislature comes up with an enactment, the LGBTQIA+ community cannot be left in a vulnerable atmosphere where there is no guarantee for their protection and safety.

— Justice N Anand Venkatesh, Page number 55 out of 104

On 7 June 2021, in delivering the verdict on this case, Justice N Anand Venkatesh prohibited conversion therapy. He suggested comprehensive measures to sensitise the society and various branches of the state including the police and judiciary to remove prejudices against the LGBTQ community. He suggested that changes should be made to the curricula of schools and universities to educate students on understanding the LGBTQ community.

However, despite the historic and seminal rulings by the courts, conversion therapy is still practised and openly advertised in India. Human-rights activists claim the regulation is too weak.

== Living conditions ==
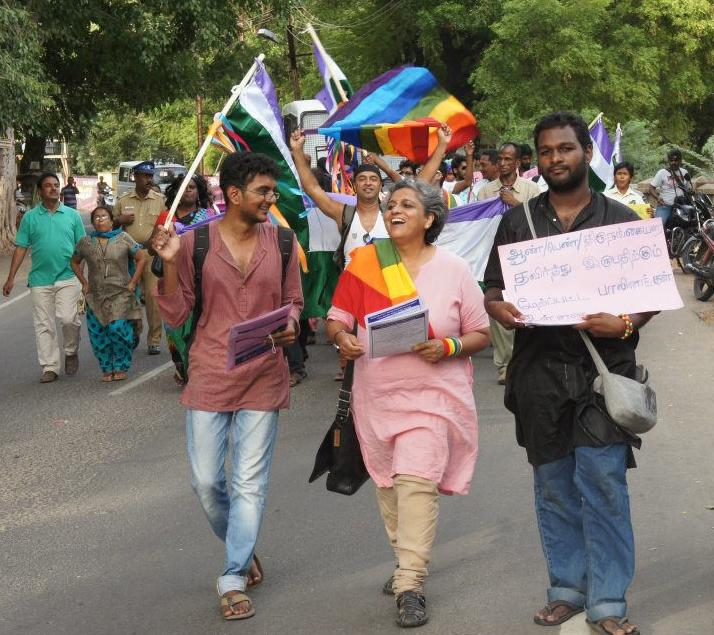
Asia's first Genderqueer Pride Parade in Madurai, Tamil Nadu (2012). Anjali Gopalan is seen in the foreground.

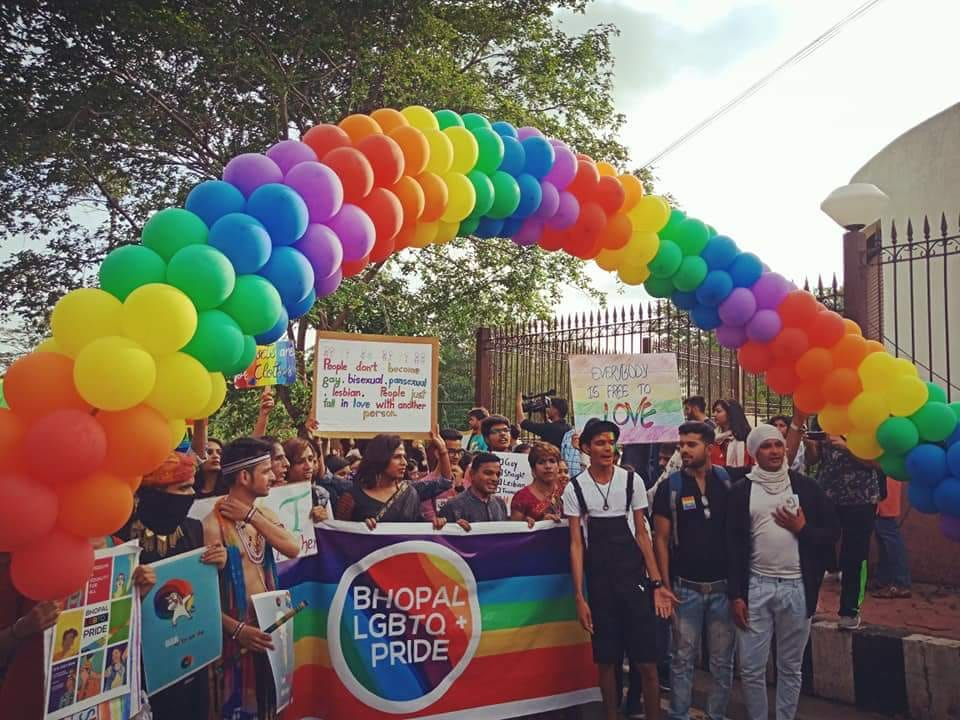
Participants at the 2018 Bhopal Pride parade, in Madhya Pradesh

There are many avenues for the LGBTQ community in metro cities for meeting and socialising. These include GayBombay (Mumbai), Good as You (Bangalore), HarmlessHugs (Delhi), Orinam (Chennai), Queerala (Kochi), Queerythm (Thiruvananthapuram), Mobbera (Hyderabad), Queer Nilayam (Hyderabad), Parichay Collective (Bhubaneswar) and Sahodaran (Chennai). Groups focused on LGBTQ women include ASQ (Bangalore), Labia (Mumbai), Sappho for Equality (Kolkata), Sahayathrika (Thrissur), Chennai Queer Cafe, among others. Trans-specific groups that are focused on support and advocacy include Sampoorna, Tweet Foundation, Telangana Hijra Trans Intersex Samiti and many others. Recently, a queer dating platform named "Amour Queer Dating" was launched to help LGBTQ people find long-term partners.

There have been many reports of abuse, harassment and violence over the years directed against LGBTQ people. In 2003 a hijra was gang-raped in Bangalore, and then gang-raped by the police. Testimonies provided to the Delhi High Court in 2007 documented how a gay man abducted by the police in Delhi was raped by police officials for several days and forced to sign a "confession" saying "I am a gandu [a derogatory term, meaning one who has anal sex]". In 2011 a Haryana lesbian couple was murdered by their nephews for being in an "immoral" relationship. According to reports from activist group Kavi's Humsafar Trust, two-fifths of homosexuals in the country had faced blackmail after the 2013 Supreme Court ruling. Suicide attempts are common. In early 2018 a lesbian couple committed suicide and left a note reading: "We have left this world to live with each other. The world did not allow us to stay together."

In February 2017 the Ministry of Health and Family Welfare unveiled resource material relating to health issues to be used as a part of a nationwide adolescent peer-education plan called Saathiya. Among other subjects, the material discusses homosexuality. The material states, "Yes, adolescents frequently fall in love. They can feel attraction for a friend or any individual of the same or opposite sex. It is normal to have special feelings for someone. It is important for adolescents to understand that such relationships are based on mutual consent, trust, transparency and respect. It is alright to talk about such feelings to the person for whom you have them but always in a respectful manner."

In 2017 Delhi held its tenth pride parade, attended by hundreds of people. Chennai has held pride parades since 2009, while Goa held its first pride parade in October 2017. Bhubaneswar organised its first in September 2018, and Guwahati held its first pride event in February 2014. The first such event in Sikkim was held in January 2019 in the city of Gangtok.

On 17 May 2018, the International Day Against Homophobia, activities were held throughout the country, including in Bhopal, Delhi, Mumbai, Kolhapur, Thiruvananthapuram and Lucknow. Numerous foreign embassies (Australia, Austria, Belgium, Brazil, Canada, Costa Rica, Croatia, the Czech Republic, Denmark, Finland, France, Germany, Greece, Iceland, Ireland, Italy, Japan, Latvia, Lithuania, Luxembourg, Malta, Mexico, New Zealand, the Netherlands, Norway, Portugal, Serbia, Slovenia, Spain, Sweden, Switzerland, the United Kingdom and the United States) expressed support for LGBTQ rights in India, and reaffirmed their countries' commitment to promote human rights.

According to a 2018 survey, a third of Indian gay men were married to women who were unaware that they are secretly gay.

=== Politics ===
The All India Hijra Kalyan Sabha fought for over a decade to get voting rights, which they finally got in 1994. In 1996 Kali stood for office in Patna under the then Judicial Reform Party. Munni ran in the elections as well for South Mumbai that year. They both lost.

After the defeat of Kali and Munni, three years later, Kamla Jaan was elected Mayor of Katni. Shabnam Mausi was elected to the Legislative Assembly of Madhya Pradesh in 1998. Over the next few years, multiple other transgender candidates won office. These include Heera who won a seat on the City Council of Jabalpur and Gulshan who was elected to the City Council in Bina Etawa. In December 2000 Asha Devi became Mayor of Gorakhpur, and Kallu Kinnar was elected to the City Council in Varanasi.

Shabnam Mausi is the first transgender Indian to be elected to public office. She was an elected member of the Madhya Pradesh State Legislative Assembly from 1998 to 2003. In 2003, hijras in Madhya Pradesh announced the establishment of their own political party called "Jeeti Jitayi Politics" (JJP; Hindi: जीती जिताई पालिटिक्स), which literally means "politics that has already been won". The party also released an eight-page election manifesto which it claims outlines why it is different from mainstream political parties.

In the 2011 assembly elections in Tamil Nadu the transgender activist Kalki Subramaniam unsuccessfully challenged a DMK ticket. In March 2014 Kalki announced in Puducherry that she would contest a seat in an election in the Villupuram constituency in neighbouring Tamil Nadu.

On 4 January 2015 the independent transgender candidate Madhu Bai Kinnar was elected Mayor of Raigarh, Chhattisgarh.

Manabi Bandopadhyay became India's first transgender college principal on 9 June 2015 when she assumed the role of principal of the Krishnagar Women's College in Nadia district, West Bengal.

On 5 November 2015 K. Prithika Yashini became the first out transgender police officer in the state of Tamil Nadu. At the time, the Tamil Nadu police had three transgender constables, but Yashini became the first transgender person to hold the rank of officer in the state. Transgender men are an integral part of the police force in many states of India. Many of them remain in the women police force and fear changing their legal name and gender as this could pose a risk to their employment.

On 12 February 2017 two transgender people were appointed by the Kolhapur District Legal Services Authority (KDLSA) as panel members for the local Lok Adalat (People's Court). 30 panels were appointed to settle general local disputes that arise within the community. Members of the KDLSA have stated this appointment was their "main achievement".

In July 2017 Joyita Mondal was appointed to the Islampur Lok Adalat, becoming West Bengal's first transgender judge. In 2018, Swati Bidham Baruah became the first transgender judge in Assam. Swati, founder of the All Assam Transgender Association, was appointed to the Guwahati Lok Adalat.

Transgender representation was particularly noticeable in the Lok Sabha elections of 2019, with many candidates running in Andhra Pradesh, Gujarat, Kerala, Maharashtra, Odisha, Tamil Nadu and Uttar Pradesh. Most major parties mentioned LGBTQ rights in their election manifestos. The Bharatiya Janata Party (BJP) ran on a platform of greater rights for the transgender community, adding that it "will ensure self-employment and skill development avenues for transgender youth". The Indian National Congress' manifesto states that the party "recognises the sexual diversity among people and promises equality and equal protection of the laws to people with different sexual orientations and gender identities", specifically advocating for a transgender bill drafted in consultation with LGBTQ groups and gender sensitivity training in all government departments. In addition, the Indian National Congress manifesto promised to hold a discussion on enacting same-sex civil unions if it gained control of the Lok Sabha in the 2024 general election.

In the 2026 Rajya Sabha elections, lawyer Menaka Guruswamy became India's first openly LGBTQ+ national-level member of Parliament, elected on behalf of the Trinamool Congress.

== Intersex rights ==
Legal prohibition of non-consensual medical interventions Regulatory suspension of non-consensual medical interventions

Explicit protection from discrimination on grounds of sex characteristics Explicit protection on grounds of intersex status Explicit protection on grounds of intersex within attribute of sex

Intersex issues in India may often be perceived as third gender issues. The most well-known third gender groups in India are the hijras. After interviewing and studying hijras for many years, Serena Nanda writes in her book, Neither Man Nor Woman: The hijras of India, as follows: "There is a widespread belief in India that hijras are born Third Genders [intersex] and are taken away by the hijra community at birth or in childhood, but I found no evidence to support this belief among the hijras I met, all of whom joined the community voluntarily, often in their teens." Sangam literature uses the word pedi to refer to people born intersex, but the indigenous gender minorities in India were clear about intersex people and referred to them as mabedi usili and gave a distinct identity to denote them.

=== Physical integrity and bodily autonomy ===
Intersex persons are not protected from violations to physical integrity and bodily autonomy.

Cases of infanticide have been reported involving infants with obvious intersex conditions at birth, along with a failure to thrive by infants assigned female. Medical reports suggest that parents in India prefer to assign infants with intersex conditions as male, with surgical interventions taking place when parents can afford them.

In a reply to a letter from the intersex rights activist Gopi Shankar Madurai, the Ministry of Health and Family Welfare replied that "Any kind of invasive medical procedure including sex reassignment operations are done only after thorough assessment of the patient, obtaining justification for the procedure planned to be conducted with the help of appropriate diagnostic test and only after taking a written consent of the patient/guardian".

Besides male and female, Indian passports are available with an "O" sex descriptor (for "Other").

On 22 April 2019 the Madras High Court issued a landmark judgment in which it upheld the marriage rights of transgender women, and directed the state of Tamil Nadu to ban sex-selective surgeries on intersex infants. Based on the works of intersex activist Gopi Shankar, the Court took note of the rampant practice of compulsory medical interventions performed on intersex infants and children. The court further cited examples from Hindu mythology in its ruling, namely the story of Iravan.

=== Protection from discrimination ===
Multiple Indian athletes have been subjected to humiliation, discrimination and loss of work and medals following sex verification. The middle-distance runner Santhi Soundarajan, who won the silver medal in 800 metres at the 2006 Asian Games in Doha, Qatar, was stripped of her medal, and later attempted suicide. The track athlete Pinki Pramanik was accused by a female roommate of rape and later charged, gender tested and declared male, though she and other medical experts dispute these claims. The athlete Dutee Chand won a case against the IAAF in 2015, enabling women athletes with high testosterone levels to compete as women, on the basis that there is no clear evidence of performance benefits. In 2016 some sport clinicians stated: "One of the fundamental recommendations published almost 25 years ago ... that athletes born with a disorder of sex development and raised as females be allowed to compete as women remains appropriate".

=== Intersex people in Indian politics ===
Gopi Shankar Madurai was one of the youngest, and the first openly intersex and genderqueer, candidate to run in an Indian election, contesting a seat in the 2016 Tamil Nadu Legislative Assembly election.

== Public opinion ==
Public opinion on same-sex marriage (2023) based on Pew Research Center
1. Strongly favor (28.0%)
2. Somewhat favor (25.0%)
3. Not sure (4.00%)
4. Somewhat oppose (12.0%)
5. Strongly oppose (31.0%)

The data on public opinion on LGBTQ rights is limited in India. One of the recent study was conducted by the multinational research firm Ipsos between 23 April and 7 May 2021. They released a report titled "LGBT+ Pride 2021 Global Survey". Indian participants to survey were selected and polled online. (Note: The report noted that participants of online surveys from India "tend to be more urban, educated, and/or affluent than the general population.")

Public opinion on LGBT rights is complex in India. According to a 2025 data from the Pew Research Center, opposition to homosexuality in India remains high, with 59% of respondents labeling it "morally unacceptable". However, support for civil rights has seen an increase, and according to 2023 data from the Pew Research Center, 53% of respondents favored same-sex marriage.

Acceptance towards LGBTQ people is reportedly far higher in top universities, such as the Indian Institutes of Technology, the Indian Institute of Science, Delhi University and the Indian Institutes of Management. According to a poll conducted at IIT Delhi in 2015, 72% of respondents agreed that "being homosexual is normal as being heterosexual". Many institutes have their own LGBTQ clubs, namely IKQRAAR at IISER Kolkata, Saathi at IIT Bombay, Indradhanu at IIT Delhi, Ambar at IIT Kharagpur, Unmukt at IIT Kanpur, Satrangi at IISER Pune, Anchor at BITS Pilani, HCQC at Hindu College and more. Another survey in 2019 revealed that over 69% of Indian respondents want same-sex marriages to be legalised.

=== Visibility and exposure ===
==== 2021 ====
According to Ipsos' online LGBT+ Pride 2021 Global Survey, 59% of the surveyed Indians support LGBTQ people being open about their sexual orientation or gender identity with everyone, 39% support LGBTQ people displaying affection in public (e.g., kissing or holding hands), 56% support openly lesbian, gay and bisexual athletes in sports teams, 55% support more LGBTQ characters on TV, in films and in advertising. The same survey found that 17% of the Indians have a relative, friend or colleague who is homosexual (Including gay and lesbian), 21% have a relative, friend or colleague who is bisexual, 10% have a relative, friend or colleague who is transgender, 12% have a relative, friend or colleague who is non-binary, non-conforming or gender-fluid.

==== 2022 ====
According to a 2022 survey by the World Values Survey, 62% of Indians "would not like to have homosexuals as neighbors".

==== 2023 ====
A poll by Gallup, Inc. in June 2023 found that 43% of Indians thought that their country was a good place to live for gay people, with a sharp decline compared to the previous year. The percentage of Indian respondents who supported same-sex marriage increased to 53%, including 28% who strongly supported same-sex marriage, whereas the percentage who opposed same-sex marriage decreased to 43%.

=== Anti-discrimination ===
==== 2017 ====
According to a 2017 poll carried out by ILGA, 58% of the surveyed Indians agreed that gay, lesbian and bisexual people should have the same rights as straight people, while 30% disagreed. The poll reported that 59% agreed that they should be protected from workplace discrimination. The poll reported that 39% of Indian respondents said that people who are in same-sex relationships should be charged as criminals, while a plurality of 44% disagreed. As for transgender people, 66% agreed that they should have the same rights, 62% believed they should be protected from employment discrimination and 60% believed they should be allowed to change their legal gender.

==== 2021 ====
According to Ipsos' LGBT+ Pride 2021 Global Survey, 53% of Indian respondents support laws banning discrimination against LGBTQ people when it comes to employment, access to education, housing and social services, etc. 58% of the surveyed Indians support companies and brands actively promoting equality for LGBTQ people and 53% support transgender athletes competing based on the gender they identify with rather the sex they were assigned at birth.

=== Same-sex marriage ===
According to Ipsos' LGBT+ Pride 2021 Global Survey, 44% of Indian respondents were in favor of legalising same-sex marriage, 14% were in support of allowing some kind of legal recognition for same-sex couples with 18% opposed and 25% chose not to give their opinion. Furthermore, the survey found that 56% of the surveyed Indian's current views on same-sex marriage are different than they were five years ago.

According to a 2016 poll by the International Lesbian, Gay, Bisexual, Trans and Intersex Association, 35% of Indian respondents were in favor of legalizing same-sex marriage, with a further 35% opposed. A survey by the Varkey Foundation conducted between September and October 2016, found that support for same-sex marriage was higher among 18–21 year old respondents at 53%.

=== Adoption rights ===
Public opinion on Adoption Rights (2021)
1. Same-sex couples should have the same adoption rights as opposite-sex couples (66.0%)
2. Same-sex couples should not have the same adoption rights as opposite-sex couples (21.0%)
3. Not sure (13.0%)

According to Ipsos LGBT+ Pride 2021 Global Survey, 66% of Indian respondents believed that same-sex couples should have the same adoption rights as opposite sex couples, 21% disagreed and 13% were unsure. Similarly, 59% of Indian respondents think that the same-sex couples are just as likely as other parents to successfully raise children, 26% disagreed and 16% were unsure.

=== Developments in 2023 ===
In 2023 the issue of same-sex marriage and adoption rights was raised before the Supreme Court of India by the LGBTQ community but the Supreme Court held that it is a matter to be decided by parliament and judiciary cannot frame laws on this subject.

== Public support ==
The supportive actions of the larger public for the LGBTQ rights has been documented in the recent study conducted online by the multinational research firm Ipsos between 23 April and 7 May 2021. They released report titled "LGBT+ Pride 2021 Global Survey". (Note: The report noted that participants of online surveys from India "tend to be more urban, educated, and/or affluent than the general population.")

=== Political support ===
Since 2019 Pink List India has provided for the country's first political archive of LGBTQIA stances of Indian politicians. 116 MPs in the Lok Sabha have come out in support of LGBTQ rights, most of this support has devolved into limited support for transgender individuals but discussion on same-sex unions tend to be silent. The Transgender Persons (Protection of Rights) Act, 2019 was passed in parliament with mixed responses from LGBTQIA activists, condemning the act for being regressive, it provided lower penalties for trans women who experienced sexual assault and requires medical intervention for gender change. Despite the little talk on same-sex unions, many MPs have come out against Section 377 and some parties still have shown support for same-sex unions or marriage. The Communist Party of India and Communist Party of India (Marxist) are the only parties to come out in support of same-sex unions with the latter including it in its 2019 manifesto and the former releasing a statement at the time a same-sex marriage case was pending before the Supreme Court. As of 2019, both parties have a majority of seats in the Kerala Legislative Assembly and are part of the governments in several other states but there seems to be no political will to push for any legislation. The Indian National Congress has shown some limited support for LGBTQ individuals. After an October 2023 ruling from the Supreme Court on marriage rights, the party made a statement saying it will have a response subsequently on the verdict.

==== 2021 ====
According to Ipsos LGBT+ Pride 2021 Global Survey, 21% of Indians have attended a public event in support of LGBTQ people (e.g., a Pride march).

=== Social support ===
==== 2021 ====
According to Ipsos LGBT+ Pride 2021 Global Survey, 18% of Indians have attended same-sex wedding, 19% visited a bar or nightclub that primarily caters to LGBTQ people, and 30% have spoken against someone who was being prejudiced against LGBTQ people.

LGBTQ rights activists from India: This category is for people who have specifically been involved in activism around LGBTQ (Lesbian, Gay, Bisexual, Transgender) issues. It should not include LGBTQ people who have been prominent in other areas of activism. Notable persons like Anjali Gopalan, Shrushti Chavan, Shravani Chavan and Celina Jaitly who are not LGBTQ persons but their efforts made the Indian Government to decriminalise IPC 377 on 6 September 2018.

== Opposition ==
While there has been support for LGBTQ rights across the nation, there has been equal opposition. Several right-wing organisations like Bajrang Dal, Vishva Hindu Parishad, Karni Sena and many others have opposed rights for same-sex couples. According to the VHP, several leaders classify homosexuality as mental disease. Several VHP and Bajrang Dal activists have violently targeted LGBTQ parades as well as Pride events across the country. The VHP and Bajrang Dal objected on allowing same-sex marriages by calling it a Western attack on Indian culture and supported the Supreme Court's judgment in April 2023.

== Summary table ==
Right	Yes/No	Note
Same-sex sexual activity
Same-sex sexual activity legal	Yes	Since 2009–2013, again in 2018 (Navtej Singh Johar v. Union of India)
Equal age of consent (18)	Yes	Since 2009–2013, again in 2018
Discrimination protections regarding sexual orientation
Anti-discrimination laws in employment	Yes /	
Anti-discrimination laws in the provision of goods and services	No	
Anti-discrimination laws in all other areas (indirect discrimination and other acts of discrimination)	Yes /	Only from state and government bodies. The supreme court has interpreted prohibition of discrimination against 'sex' in the Indian Constitution extends to 'sexual orientation'.
Recognition of same-sex relationships
Same-sex marriages		1 same-sex marriage recognised back in 2011
Recognition of same-sex couples	Yes	Since 2020, limited cohabitation rights granted by some courts
Adoption and family planning
Stepchild adoption by same-sex couples		
Adoption by LGBTQ individuals	Yes	
Joint adoption by same-sex couples		
International joint adoption by same-sex couples		
Access to In vitro fertilization for lesbians		Since 2018
Commercial surrogacy for LGBTQ individuals/ couples	No	Commercial surrogacy prohibited regardless of sexual orientation
Altruistic surrogacy for LGBTQ individuals/ couples	No	Court decision pending
Automatic parenthood on birth certificates for children of same-sex couples	No	
Gender identity
Right to change legal gender	Yes	Since 2014; Medical intervention required
Coverage for sex reassignment surgery		Since 2022
Intersex minors protected from invasive surgical procedures	/	Banned only in the state of Tamil Nadu; pending in Delhi
Third gender option	Yes	Since 2014
Anti-discrimination laws covering gender identity and gender expression in all aspects.		Since 2019
Trans women protected under Domestic Violence Act	Yes	Since 2023
Other rights
Homosexuality declassified as an illness		Never classified as illnesses by the Indian Psychiatric Society
Transgender identity declassified as an illness		Never classified as illnesses by the Indian Psychiatric Society
LGBTQ individuals allowed to serve openly in the military		Court decision pending, proposed
Hate crime laws include sexual orientation and gender identity		
Conversion therapy banned	/	Medical professionals are barred from practicing conversion therapy since 2022. However, it is still widely practiced due to absence of a law.
MSMs allowed to donate blood		Court decision pending

== See also ==
- Human rights in India
- Anish Gawande, first openly gay individual to be appointed as a national spokesperson of a major political party in India
- LGBTQ rights in Asia
- LGBTQ culture in India
- National Council for Transgender Persons
- Trans People in India: A Decade after NALSA (2026)
