= Ritu Dalmia =

Indian celebrity chef and restaurateur

- Born: 1972 (age 53–54); Calcutta (now Kolkata), West Bengal, India
- Occupations: Celebrity chef, restaurateur, LGBT activist
- Known for: Italian cuisine

Ritu Dalmia (born 1972) is an Indian celebrity chef and restaurateur. She is the chef and co-owner of the popular Italian restaurant Diva in Delhi, which she established in 2000, with co-founder Gita Bhalla under partnership firm "Riga Food". Other restaurants of company include 'Latitude 28' and 'Cafe Diva'. She hosted a TV cookery show, 'Italian Khana', for NDTV Good Times for three seasons, and published her first cookbook by the same name in 2009.

She has been hosting Travelling Diva on NDTV Good Times since 2 February 2012.

Dalmia is a lesbian and a prominent LGBT rights activist. In June 2016, Dalmia and five others, all members of the LGBT community themselves, filed a writ petition in the Supreme Court of India challenging Section 377 of the Indian Penal Code. This resulted in the 2018 landmark judgment in Navtej Singh Johar and others v. Union of India in which the Supreme Court unanimously declared the law unconstitutional "in so far as it criminalises consensual sexual conduct between adults of the same sex".

== Career ==
Born in Kolkata to a Marwari business family, she joined her family business of marble stone at the age of 16. Her work led her to Italy for sourcing, where she developed a taste for the Italian cuisine and started learning more about it.

In 1993, at the age of 22, Dalmia started her first restaurant 'MezzaLuna' in the Hauz Khas Village, Delhi, that specialised in Mediterranean cuisine with an "Italian accent". Unfortunately, the restaurant was unsuccessful and she sold it after three years.

In 1996, Dalmia moved to London, where she opened the first Indian fine dining restaurant on King's Road, with partner Andy Verma. The restaurant was a big success and received good reviews, however, unable to settle in London, Dalmia sold off her shares of restaurant to Verma, and returned to Delhi in 2000. In the same year, she partnered up with Gita Bhalla to open 'Diva' Italian restaurant in Greater Kailash II that continues to be a popular restaurant in Delhi even today.

Apart from the café at the Italian Embassy's Italian Cultural Centre in Chanakyapuri, Delhi, she also runs 'Diva Café' in Greater Kailash I, 'Latitude 28' at the Alliance Francaise, Delhi and 'DIVA Piccola' at the Hauz Khas village. Dalmia also established a catering business.

In 2007, she started hosting the TV-series, "Italian Khana" on NDTV Good Times. She subsequently released a cookbook by the same name in 2009. The show lasted three seasons and won numerous television awards. She has been a Consulting Chef with Divattra, the spa restaurant at Ashok Hotel, Delhi.

She was awarded the Order of the Star of Italian Solidarity by Government of Italy in December 2011.

Dalmia published Travelling Diva: Recipes from around the World in 2012, featuring her favourite recipes from European, Asian and Middle Eastern cuisines.

== Works ==
- Italian Khana. Random House, India, 2009. ISBN 8184000219.
- Italian Khana: Dinner Party. Random House, India. ISBN 8184001029.
- Italian Khana: Desserts. Random House, India. ISBN 978-81-8400-103-7.
- Italian Khana: Vegetarian. Random House, India. ISBN 978-81-8400-101-3.
- Travelling Diva: Recipes from around the World, Hachette India 2012. ISBN 9789350092811.
- DIVA Green, Hachette India 2014. ISBN 9789350092811.
