= Suresh Kumar Koushal v. Naz Foundation =

Indian LGBT Rights Case

- Court: Supreme Court of India
- Full case name: Suresh Kumar Koushal and Anr. v. Naz Foundation and Ors.
- Decided: 11 December 2013
- Citation: Civil Appeal No. 10972 of 2013

Case history
- Appealed from: Naz Foundation v. Govt. of NCT of Delhi by High Court of Delhi

Court membership
- Judges sitting: G. S. Singhvi J. and S. J. Mukhopadhaya J.

Case opinions
- Section 377 is constitutional; Naz Foundation v. Govt. of NCT of Delhi overturned upon appeal.
- Decision by: G. S. Singhvi J.

Laws applied
- Overruled by
- Navtej Singh Johar v. Union of India (2018)

Keywords
- Criminalization of Homosexuality

Suresh Kumar Koushal & Anr. v. NAZ Foundation & Ors. (2013) is a case in which a 2-judge bench of the Supreme Court of India consisting of G. S. Singhvi and S. J. Mukhopadhaya overturned the Delhi High Court verdict in the case Naz Foundation v. Govt. of NCT of Delhi and reinstated Section 377 of the Indian Penal Code. The Supreme Court of India decided to revisit this judgement after several curative petitions were filed against it, in 2017.

However in 2018, in Navtej Singh Johar v. Union of India, a 5-judge bench of the Supreme Court overturned this 2-member judgement, again decriminalizing homosexuality. Portions of Section 377 relating to sex with minors, non-consensual sexual acts such as rape, and bestiality remain in force.

== Decision ==
The judgement of the Supreme Court of India of 11 December 2013 did not find enough reason for portions of section 377 to be declared unconstitutional and overturned the Delhi High Court judgement

The judges stated that "a miniscule fraction of the country's population constitutes lesbians, gays, bisexuals or transgenders" and that the High Court had erroneously relied upon international precedents "in its anxiety to protect the so-called rights of LGBT persons". On 11 December 2013, the Supreme Court of India set aside the 2009 judgement given by the Delhi High Court stating that judicial intervention was not required in this issue. This in effect recriminalized sexual intercourse "against the order of nature". In its judgment the Supreme court bench of justices G. S. Singhvi and S. J. Mukhopadhaya stated —

"In view of the above discussion, we hold that Section 377 IPC does not suffer from the vice of unconstitutionality and the declaration made by the Division Bench of the High court is legally unsustainable."

The two judges however noted that the Parliament should debate and decide on the matter. A bench of justices upheld the constitutional validity of Section 377 of Indian Penal Code that makes anal sex a punishable offense.

== Responses ==
Days later and influenced by the Devyani Khobragade incident, former Finance Minister Yashwant Sinha called for the arrest of same-sex companions of US diplomats, citing the Supreme Court of India's recent upholding of Section 377 of the Indian Penal Code. The recriminalization of gay sex comes under fire from World leaders. The United Nations human rights chief Navi Pillay voiced her disappointment at the re-criminalization of consensual same-sex relationships in India, calling it "a significant step backwards" for the country. In the wake of Indian Supreme Court's ruling that gay sex is illegal, UN chief Ban Ki-moon stressed on the need for equality and opposed any discrimination against lesbians, gays and bisexuals.

Transgender Rights activist Vyjayanti Vasanta Mogli intervened in Case in the Supreme Court in 2014 in which she highlighted the deleterious effects of conversion or reparative therapy on queer people through her affidavit.

Soon after the judgement, Sonia Gandhi, President of the then ruling Indian National Congress, asked Parliament to do away with section 377. Her son and Congress Party vice-president, Rahul Gandhi also wanted section-377 to go and supported gay rights.

In July 2014, Minister of State for Home Kiren Rijiju in the BJP led Central government told the Lok Sabha in a written reply that a decision regarding Section 377 of IPC can be taken only after pronouncement of judgement by the Supreme Court. However, on 13 January 2015, BJP spokesperson Shaina NC, appearing on NDTV, stated, "We [BJP] are for decriminalizing homosexuality. That is the progressive way forward."

=== Central government ===
The central government led by Indian National Congress filed a review petition on 21 December 2013. In its review petition the Centre said: "The judgment suffers from errors apparent on the face of the record, and is contrary to well-established principles of law laid down by the apex Court enunciating the width and ambit of Fundamental Rights under Articles 14, 15 and 21 of the Constitution." The IPC, when enacted in 1860, was justified; but with the passage of time it had become arbitrary and unreasonable, the petition added. Naz Foundation also filed a review petition against the Supreme Court order on Section 377. On 28 January 2014 Supreme Court dismissed the review Petition filed by Central Government, NGO Naz Foundation and several others, against its 11 December verdict on Section 377 of IPC.

=== Protest on social media ===
Actor Imran Khan took action in order to disabuse homophobic people from their mistaken notions of homosexuality in a satire video. Many Mumbai film industry personalities such as Amitabh Bachchan, Aamir Khan, Celina Jaitley, Twinkle Khanna, John Abraham, Karan Johar, Farhan Akhtar, Riteish Deshmukh, Shruti Haasan, Sonam Kapoor, Anushka Sharma, commented against the ruling. Many other well known persons, including Nobel Laureate Amartya Sen, and writer Vikram Seth, protested against the supreme court ruling.

== See also ==
- LGBTQ rights in India
- List of landmark court decisions in India
- Navtej Singh Johar v. Union of India (2018)
- Naz Foundation v. Govt. of NCT of Delhi (2009)

=== Similar landmark decisions ===
- Bowers v. Hardwick
