= Anish Gawande =

Indian politician and political spokesperson

National Spokesperson, Nationalist Congress Party (Sharadchandra Pawar faction)
- Incumbent
- Assumed office August 2024

Personal details
- Born: 26 August 1996 (age 30) Mumbai, India
- Party: Nationalist Congress Party – Sharadchandra Pawar
- Relations: Trimbak Krishna Tope (grandfather)
- Occupation: Politician, activist, writer
- Known for: First openly gay national spokesperson of a major Indian political party

Anish Gawande (Born 26 August 1996) is an Indian politician, LGBTQ+ rights advocate, and a national spokesperson of the Nationalist Congress Party (Sharadchandra Pawar faction). He is recognised as the first openly gay individual to be appointed as a national spokesperson of a major political party in India.

== Early life and education ==
Gawande was raised in Mumbai and attended Greenlawns School, Worli, and Cathedral and John Connon School, Fort. He studied Comparative Literature at Columbia University and later pursued postgraduate studies in intellectual history and public policy at the University of Oxford as a Rhodes Scholar.

== Activism and early career ==
Prior to joining party politics, Gawande worked as a writer and LGBTQ+ rights advocate. He founded Pink List India, a public archive documenting Indian politicians who have expressed support for LGBTQ+ rights, aimed at increasing visibility and political accountability on queer issues.

== Political career ==
In August 2024, Gawande was appointed as a national spokesperson of the Nationalist Congress Party (Sharadchandra Pawar faction). His appointment was widely described as historic due to him being openly gay, marking a milestone for LGBTQ+ representation in Indian politics. In May 2026, Gawande was a featured speaker at India Week in London.

== Political views ==
In 2025, Gawande commented on a controversy involving online content creators and the proposed Broadcasting Services (Regulation) Bill, cautioning that disproportionate outrage over remarks by a YouTuber could be used to justify excessive regulation of digital media and independent creators.

Gawande criticised the Supreme Court's order concerning stray dogs in Delhi-NCR, writing on X that the directive was “nothing but a death sentence for every single stray on every single street” and urging the public to raise their voices in opposition to the ruling, which he viewed as harmful to animal welfare.

In Maharashtra politics, Gawande condemned controversial remarks made by a BJP legislator against senior opposition leaders, calling them a “new low” in public discourse.

== Personal life ==
Gawande is openly gay and has spoken publicly about the challenges of being openly queer in Indian political spaces.

== See also ==
- LGBT rights in India
- Nationalist Congress Party
