= Navtej Singh Johar v. Union of India =

Indian LGBT Rights Case Law

- Court: Supreme Court of India
- Full case name: Navtej Singh Johar & Ors. versus Union of India thr. Secretary Ministry of Law and Justice
- Decided: 6 September 2018
- Citation: 2018 INSC 790

Case history
- Prior action: Suresh Kumar Koushal v. Naz Foundation

Court membership
- Judges sitting: Dipak Misra, CJI; Rohinton Fali Nariman, J.; A. M. Khanwilkar, J; D. Y. Chandrachud, J; and Indu Malhotra, J

Case opinions
- The Court decriminalised all consensual sex among adults, including homosexual sex.
- Decision by: Dipak Misra, R. F. Nariman, D. Y. Chandrachud and Indu Malhotra
- Plurality: Dipak Misra, joined by A. M. Khanwilkar
- Concurrence: Rohinton Fali Nariman, Indu Malhotra, D. Y. Chandrachud

Laws applied
- This case overturned a previous ruling
- Suresh Kumar Koushal v. Naz Foundation by Supreme Court of India

Keywords
- Criminalization of Homosexuality, Discrimination Based on Sexual Orientation

Navtej Singh Johar & Ors. v. Union of India thr. Secretary Ministry of Law and Justice (2018) is a landmark decision of the Supreme Court of India that decriminalised all consensual sex among adults, including homosexual sex.

The court was asked to determine the constitutionality of Section 377 of the Indian Penal Code, a colonial-era law which, among other things, criminalised homosexual acts as an "unnatural offence". While the statute criminalises all anal sex and oral sex, including between opposite-sex couples, it largely affected same-sex relationships. On 6 September 2018, the court unanimously declared the law unconstitutional "in so far as it criminalises consensual sexual conduct between adults of the same sex". The verdict was hailed as a landmark decision for LGBT rights in India, with campaigners waiting outside the court cheering after the verdict was pronounced.

Elements of Section 377 relating to sex with minors, non-consensual sexual acts such as rape, and bestiality remain in force.

== Background ==
On 27 April 2016, five people, all members of the LGBT community themselves, filed a new writ petition in the Supreme Court challenging the constitutionality of Section 377 of the Indian Penal Code. The petitioners claimed that the issues which they raised in their petition were varied and diverse from those raised in the pending curative petition in the 2013 Koushal v. Naz case, in which the Supreme Court had upheld the constitutionality of Section 377. The Naz Foundation had been earlier referred to a five-judge bench in order to decide whether the curative petition could be accepted for consideration. The petitioners were dancer Navtej Singh Johar, journalist Sunil Mehra, chef Ritu Dalmia, hoteliers Aman Nath and Keshav Suri, and businesswoman Ayesha Kapur. This case was the first instance wherein the petitioners argued that they had all been directly aggrieved because of Section 377, alleging it to be a direct violation of their fundamental rights. The opposition to decriminalisation petitions was led by Apostolic Alliance of Churches, Utkal Christian Council and Trust God Ministries. Advocate Manoj George represented the first two and Senior Advocate KS Radhakrishnan the third. The NDA government took a neutral stance, leaving the decision to the "wisdom of the court" as long as it applies to "consensual acts of adults in private".

== Proceedings ==
The petition was first placed before the former Chief Justice of India Justice T.S. Thakur, Justice S. A. Bobde and Justice A. K. Bhushan on 29 June 2016. An order was passed to post the matter before Justice Dipak Misra for appropriate orders since a curative petition was already pending before the constitution bench. On 8 January 2018, the case (Navtej Singh Johar and others v. Union of India) was listed to be heard by the Chief Justice's bench, which passed an order stating that the case would be heard by a constitution bench.

The matter was heard from 17 January 2018 by a five-judge constitution bench of the Supreme Court. On 10 July 2018, the SC commenced hearing of the pleas challenging the constitutionality of section 377. The bench ended its hearing on 17 July and reserved its verdict, asking for both sides to submit written submissions for their claims by 20 July.

== Judgment ==
The judgement of the Supreme Court of India of 6 September 2018 overturning its own verdict in Suresh Kumar Koushal vs. Naz Foundation hence declaring all private consensual sexual acts between adults legal including homosexual ones.

On 6 September 2018, the court delivered its unanimous verdict, declaring portions of the law relating to consensual sexual acts between adults unconstitutional. The Bench unanimously found that the criminalisation of sexual acts between consenting adults to be violation of the Article 14, 15, 19, and 21 of Indian Constitution.

This decision overturns the 2013 ruling in Suresh Kumar Koushal v. Naz Foundation in which the court upheld the law. However, other portions of Section 377 relating to sex with minors, non-consensual sexual acts, and bestiality remain in force.

While reading the judgment, the then Chief Justice of India Dipak Misra pronounced that the court found "criminalising carnal intercourse" to be "irrational, arbitrary and manifestly unconstitutional". The court ruled that LGBTQ people in India are entitled to all constitutional rights, including the liberties protected by the Constitution of India. It held that "the choice of whom to partner, the ability to find fulfilment in sexual intimacies and the right not to be subjected to discriminatory behaviour are intrinsic to the constitutional protection of sexual orientation".

In his concurring opinion, Justice D.Y. Chandrachud, observing the discrimination, stigmatisation and marginalisation of sexual and gender minorities due to dominance of endosex, heterosexual and cisgender norms, said

Individuals belonging to sexual and gender minorities experience discrimination, stigmatization, and, in some cases, denial of care on account of their sexual orientation and gender identity. However, it is important to note that ‘sexual and gender minorities’ do not constitute a homogenous group, and experiences of social exclusion, marginalization, and discrimination, as well as specific health needs, vary considerably. Nevertheless, these individuals are united by one factor - that their exclusion, discrimination and marginalization is rooted in societal heteronormativity and society’s pervasive bias towards gender binary and opposite-gender relationships, which marginalizes and excludes all non-heteronormative sexual and gender identities.

— para. 72, page 93

In her concurring opinion, Justice Indu Malhotra, acknowledging historical discrimination and apologizing for delay in redressal, said

History owes an apology to the members of this community and their families, for the delay in providing redressal for the ignominy and ostracism that they have suffered through the centuries. The members of this community were compelled to live a life full of fear of reprisal and persecution. This was on account of the ignorance of the majority to recognise that homosexuality is a completely natural condition, part of a range of human sexuality. The mis-application of this provision denied them the Fundamental Right to equality guaranteed by Article 14. It infringed the Fundamental Right to non-discrimination under Article 15, and the Fundamental Right to live a life of dignity and privacy guaranteed by Article 21. The LGBT persons deserve to live a life unshackled from the shadow of being ‘unapprehended felons’.

— para 20, page 50

The judgement also made note that LGBT community is entitled to equal citizenship and protection under law, without discrimination.

== Public opinion ==
The Government of India decided to abstain from the hearings and had left the matter to the "[w]isdom of the [c]ourt".

=== Political parties and organisations ===
The largest constituent party of the National Democratic Alliance, a right-wing coalition, currently having a majority in the Lok Sabha (House of the People), the Bharatiya Janata Party (BJP), was one of the few parties which officially stayed silent on the verdict. Several party members did express their personal opinions on the subject, including the BJP spokesperson G. V. L. Narasimha Rao, who said that any decision on the matter "takes in sync with the jurisprudential developments on gay rights the world over would be welcome". Meanwhile, Subramanian Swamy, a Rajya Sabha (Council of the States) member of the BJP, attacked the decision, questioning if the court will legalise sexual intercourse with animals in the name of personal liberty. He was of the view that the decision could be overruled "[i]f it leads to excesses, including paedophilia, gay bars, increase in HIV cases, etc." The Prime Minister of India, Narendra Modi, has a record of saying relatively little about LGBT rights compared to other socio-political issues, and refused to comment on the same.

The right-wing organisation Rashtriya Swayamsevak Sangh conveyed its agreement with the court's verdict as it didn't believe homosexuality was a crime, but did label the orientation as "unnatural". In January 2018, the BJP's coalition partner, the Shiv Sena had supported legalisation, with its member and a member of parliament in Lok Sabha for Mumbai South, Arvind Sawant Ganpat saying, "They have the right to live the way they want. What can we say on it."

Hindu and Muslim religious groups had chosen not to oppose the decriminalization of homosexuality in court; while three Christian groups viz. Apostolic Alliance of Churches, the Utkal Christian Council, and Trust God Ministries, argued in favour of Section 377 during the hearings. All India Muslim Personal Law Board, an NGO representing the legal interests of Muslims, had urged the government to take a stand against the scrapping of Section 377; and after the court's verdict said that, “Legalizing homosexuality is against Indian values and culture. No religion allows immorality. The government must pass a bill to protect the rights of women as they are the major victims of legalised homosexuality.”

The largest opposition party in India, the Indian National Congress of the United Progressive Alliance, issued a statement welcoming the ruling. The organisation remarked that the judgement should bring about "the beginning of a more equal and inclusive society". This was in contrast to its previous objection in the same case in 2009 when it was in government during the initial Naz Foundation case, stating that gay sex was 'immoral' and that it cannot be decriminalised.

=== Overseas ===
In terms of non-governmental organisations, the group Human Rights Watch welcomed what happened, with its South Asia director labelling the judgement as "hugely significant". Amnesty International also praised the ruling. The United Nations welcomed the judgement, hoping that it will be the first step towards guaranteeing the full range of fundamental rights to LGBTI persons.

Global News suggested that similar colonial laws in South Asia, modelled on India's Section 377, could be declared unconstitutional following this verdict. The agency stated that the ruling "emboldened activists in neighbouring countries". In terms of LGBT rights in Sri Lanka, a similar law in that nation, which has not been enforced in decades, was declared unenforceable by its Supreme Court and is effectively dormant. However, differences in how constitutional matters are handled mean that the law cannot be removed without the consent of the electorate. Global News also noted that the nations of Bangladesh, Myanmar, and Pakistan face problems with LGBT people suffering from public discrimination, outside of the context of laws restricting homosexuality.

Simon Chesterman, dean of the National University of Singapore Faculty of Law, congratulated India on the verdict in a Facebook post. In response to Chesterman's post, Singaporean diplomat Tommy Koh wrote on Facebook that Singaporean LGBT activists should take the opportunity to overturn Section 377A of the Penal Code, a position supported by Chief of Government Communications Janadas Devan. Later, on 10 September, disc jockey and producer Johnson Ong Ming filed a lawsuit in court against Section 377A. However, Law and Home Affairs Minister K. Shanmugam stated that “[t]his issue relates to social mores, values - so can you impose viewpoints on a majority when it so closely relates to a social value system?”

== Successive cases ==
The case also opened the door for development of rights for same-sex couples through successive litigation. The case Deepika Singh v. Central Administrative Tribunal (2022) widened the definition of family under Indian law to include same-sex couples for the first time, ruling that families are deserving of equal protection under law guaranteed in the Article 14 of the Indian Constitution and benefits available under social welfare legislation. However, the case Supriyo v. Union of India (2023) stopped short of ruling in favour a right to marriage, civil union or adoption for same-sex couples under existing law, instead placing the onus on Parliament and the Cabinet to pass successive legislation to define the rights of same-sex couples.

In 2026, the Solicitor General Tushar Mehta appearing as Central government's representative in another case referred the Navtej Singh Johar case ruling as 'Not a good law'.

== See also ==
- LGBTQ rights in India
- List of landmark court decisions in India
- S Sushma v. Commissioner of Police (2021)
- Chinmayee Jena v. State of Odisha (2020)
- Justice K. S. Puttaswamy (Retd.) v. Union Of India (2017)

=== Similar Foreign Cases ===
- Lawrence v. Texas
- Jones v. Trinidad and Tobago
