= Apwint =

Gender in Myanmar

Apwint (Burmese: အပွင့်) is a culturally specific term to Myanmar which is used to refer to individuals assigned male at birth who openly identify as women and are attracted to men. External to the local context, apwint are commonly regarded more broadly as transgender women. However, according to Veronese et al., "unlike typical Western characterizations [such as in the LGBT community] that utilize separate categories to define sexual and gender identities, one set of labels are often used across Asia to characterize both sexual and gender identities." Another Myanama term, apone (Burmese: အပုန်း), is used to describe males "who are sexually oriented towards other men yet conceal their sexual preferences in most social spheres or circumstances and are often locally referred to as ‘hidden, or ‘hider’ for their presentation as ‘men’ in public and certain social environments." Both apwint and apone are believed to share the same ‘feminine’ inner self, but differ in their outward gender expression.

Section 377 of the British colonial penal code, which criminalized all sexual acts "against the order of nature," was sanctioned during British rule in Burma and was used to persecute apwint. Following the end of British rule in 1948, Myanmar retained the law as a legacy of colonialism. The Myanmar Police Force continue to use Section 377 to persecute apwint, who are "considered male in the eyes of the law," even if they are not engaging in any sexual activity, despite this being stipulated as a provision of Section 377. Apwint are stereotyped as "deviant and criminal" and threatened by police with arrest simply for existing in Myanmar society. Police have been recorded as using threats to force apwint "to solicit a bribe or sexual favor" in exchange for not being arrested. As a result of their status in society, the career and economic prospects of apwint are severely limited.
