= Jason Jones (activist) =

Trinidadian LGBTQI+ activist (born 1964)

- Born: September 5, 1964 (age 62); Port of Spain, Trinidad and Tobago
- Education: Newtown Boys' RC (primary school), Fatima College (secondary school)
- Occupation: Activist
- Website: jonesvstnt.com

Jason Jones (born 5 September 1964) is a gay LGBTQI+ activist from Trinidad and Tobago who successfully challenged the constitutionality of Sections 13 and 16 of the Sexual Offences Act prohibiting consensual adult intercourse per anum and sexual acts between consenting same-sex adults. In a landmark judgment in the English-speaking Caribbean, Justice Devindra Rampersad ruled the clauses unconstitutional and null and void.

== Early life ==
Born in Port of Spain, Jones was an altar boy and sang in the choir at St Patrick's RC Church while attending Newtown Boys' RC primary school. He later attended Fatima College. He was the grandson of the St Patrick's organist Ivy Telfer. His mother was Monica Jones, a British journalist, and his father Mervyn Telfer, a television broadcaster on the national TV station Trinidad and Tobago Television (TTT). His mother later married Rex Lassalle, one of the leaders of a Regiment mutiny on April 21, 1970, known as the Black Power Revolution. Jones was bullied as a child because "it was obvious to others" he was gay. He said in a newspaper interview that his parents "outed" him: "One day they sat me down and had a talk with me because there was so much homophobic bullying happening to me and I didn't even know what a bullerman [a homophobic slur in Trinidad] was. They sat me down and explained what it meant. They didn't avoid the pink elephant in the room." Jones was a singer and left Trinidad in 1985 to pursue his singing career in the UK.

== Jones v Trinidad and Tobago ==
Jones returned to Trinidad and Tobago in 1992 and 1996 but "was forced away again" to the UK to avoid "persecution" and "homophobia". He received death threats in Trinidad for his activism. In 2010 and 2014 he returned to Trinidad and Tobago but returned to the UK again in the face of "intolerable" homophobia. He filed the historic lawsuit in the High Court of Trinidad and Tobago on February 23, 2017, challenging the constitutionality of Sections 13 and 16 in the Sexual Offences Act on the basis that: the “very existence of these sections continuously and directly affects the claimant’s private life by forcing him to either respect the law and refrain from engaging – even in private with consenting male partners – in prohibited sexual acts to which he is disposed by reason of his homosexual orientation, or to commit the prohibited acts and thereby become liable to criminal prosecution”. The lawsuit claimed the legislation infringed on his rights to privacy and freedom of thought and expression, and contravened his human rights. He further claimed those sections of the Act opened him up to ridicule and persecution because they criminalized consensual adult homosexual acts.

Jones was represented by Richard Drabble QC, Rishi Dass and Antonio Emmanuel; and the State by Fyard Hosein, SC, Keisha Prosper and Lesley Almarales.

The court heard arguments in January 2018 and delivered its judgment on April 12, 2018.

In his judgement Justice Devindra Rampersad said Jones had proved the State's retention of the pertinent sections had “everything to do with homosexuality and the colonial abhorrence to the practice.” “It is a threat that is sanctioned by the State and that sanction is an important sanction because it justifies in the mind of others in society who are differently minded that the very lifestyle, life and existence of a person who chooses to live, in the way that the claimant does, is criminal and is deemed of a lesser value than anyone else. Those criminal sanctions have the potential to be used oppressively by differently minded citizens as a foundation for hate as condoned by the State,” the judgement said.

Rampersad said of LGBTQI+ people in his judgment:

That is not their identity. That is not their soul. That is not the sum total of their value to society or their value to themselves. The experiences of apartheid South Africa and the USA during and after slavery, even into the mid- and late 20th century, have shown the depths that human dignity has been plunged as a result of presupposed and predetermined prejudices based on factors that do not accept or recognise humanity. Racial segregation, apartheid, the Holocaust – these are all painful memories of this type of prejudice.

The law cannot simply be struck from the books because of the Savings Provision of the Trinidad and Tobago Constitution, which retains laws that were in force before the Constitution was enacted in 1976. What Trinidadians and Tobagonians call the "Buggery Law" was inherited from the British legal code. However, since the original law was amended twice to raise penalties against homosexual sex acts, Jones argued the savings clause is not relevant.

The Attorney General, Faris Al-Rawi, has since promised to appeal the ruling.

The Trinidad and Tobago Court of Appeal upheld the appeal of the Attorney General on 25 March 2025. Jason Jones has stated his intention to appeal the ruling to the Privy Council.

On 10 November 2026, the Privy Council unanimously overturned the buggery law. Philip James Sales, the committee's spokesman, stated, "Those laws cannot be regarded as reasonably justifiable in a society that has a proper respect for the rights and freedom of the individual."

== Media activism ==
Jones uses social media to raise funds for his legal campaign. His Instagram, Twitter and Facebook accounts often feature posts on his campaign for LGBTQI+ rights in Trinidad and Tobago.

== See also ==
- LGBT rights in Trinidad and Tobago
