= Shabnam Mausi =

Indian politician

Shabnam Bano

Member of Madhya Pradesh Legislative Assembly
- In office 2000–2003
- Preceded by: Krishnapal Singh
- Succeeded by: Chhote Lal Sarawagi (Khuddi Bhaiya)
- Constituency: Sohagpur Assembly constituency

Personal details
- Party: Jeeti Jitayi Politics; Independent
- Nickname: Mausi

Shabnam "Mausi" Bano ("Mausi" being Hindi for "Auntie") is an Indian politician and hijra activist. She became the first transgender person to be elected to public office in India, as a Member of the Legislative Assembly. She was an elected member of the Madhya Pradesh State Legislative Assembly from 2000 to 2003, after winning a by-election.

== Early life ==
She was born visibly intersex and was given a masculine name. Her father, a police superintendent, gave her away shortly after she was born to protect his own social image.

She attended only two years of primary schooling but learned 12 languages during her travels. She is a trained classical dancer, and has played bit roles in films.

== Political career ==
Shabnam Mausi was elected in a by-election from the Sohagpur Assembly constituency in Madhya Pradesh state's Shahdol-Anuppur district. Hijras were granted voting rights in 1994 in India. As a member of the Legislative Assembly, her agenda included fighting corruption, unemployment, poverty, and hunger, as well as speaking out against discrimination against transgender people, hijras, eunuchs, cross-dressers and raising awareness about HIV/AIDS. She lost re-election to the Bharatiya Janata Party candidate in the 2003 Madhya Pradesh Legislative Assembly election, placing 11th.

In 2003, hijras in Madhya Pradesh established their own political party called "Jeeti Jitayi Politics" (JJP), which literally means 'politics that has already been won'. The party released an eight-page manifesto to outline its political differences from the mainstream.

== Popular culture and legacy ==
In 2005, a fiction feature film titled Shabnam Mausi was made about her life. It was directed by Yogesh Bharadwaj, and the role of Shabnam Mausi was played by Ashutosh Rana.

Although she is no longer in public office, Shabnam Mausi continues to participate actively in AIDS/HIV education with NGOs and gender activists in India.

"We brothers and sisters often face stigma and discrimination because of our sexual orientation and gender identity. Talking openly about AIDS helps us understand each other!" - Shabnam Mausi

Shabnam Mausi inspired many transgender people in India to take up politics and participate in 'mainstream activities' in India, giving up their traditional roles as dancers, prostitutes, and beggars, living on the fringes of Indian society; for example, they sometimes attend weddings or the house of a newborn child, offering services to ward off bad luck. In recent years, however, she has had legal issues.
