= Recognition of same-sex unions in Odisha =

Odisha does not recognise same-sex marriages or civil unions. However, live-in relationships are not unlawful in Odisha. The Indian Supreme Court has held that adults have a constitutional right to live together without being married, and that police cannot interfere with consenting adults living together. The Orissa High Court upheld this constitutional right in Chinmayee Jena v. State of Odisha in August 2020. Citing Supreme Court precedent, the High Court held that same-sex live-in relationships are permissible under equality rights guaranteed by Article 21 of the Constitution. Further, it ruled that women in live-in relationships are protected from domestic violence.

== Legal history ==
=== Background ===
Marriage in India is governed under several federal laws. These laws allow for the solemnisation of marriages according to different religions, notably Hinduism, Jainism, Buddhism, Christianity, Islam, Sikhism and Zoroastrianism. Every citizen has the right to choose which law will apply to them based on their community or religion. These laws are the Hindu Marriage Act, 1955, the Indian Christian Marriage Act, 1872, the Muslim Personal Law (Shariat) Application Act, 1937, the Anand Marriage Act, 1909 and the Parsi Marriage and Divorce Act, 1936. The Special Marriage Act, 1954 (SMA; Odia: ସ୍ୱତନ୍ତ୍ର ବିବାହ ଅଧିନିୟମ, ୧୯୫୪, Swatantra Bibāha Adhiniyama; Santali: ᱵᱤᱥᱮᱥ ᱵᱟᱯᱞᱟ ᱟᱭᱤᱱ, ᱑᱙᱕᱔, Bises Bapla Ayin) (Note: Mundari: 𞓕𞓪𞓕𞓨𞓡𞓚 𞓕𞓚𞓨, 𞓱𞓹𞓵𞓴, Āɽāndi Āin; Ho: 𑣁𑣁𑣓𑣔𑣂 𑣁𑣂𑣓, 𑣡𑣩𑣥𑣤, Āndi Ain) allows civil marriage officers to solemnize and register marriages for all Indian citizens regardless of the religion of either party. Although the vast majority of marriages in India continue to be solemnized and registered under the traditional religious personal laws, the SMA has become popular among interfaith couples, inter-caste couples, and spouses with no religious beliefs. None of these acts explicitly bans same-sex marriage.

On 14 February 2006, the Supreme Court of India ruled in Smt. Seema v. Ashwani Kumar that the states and union territories are obliged to register all marriages performed under the federal laws. The court's ruling was expected to reduce instances of child marriages, bigamy, domestic violence and unlawful abandonment. Unlike other states and union territories, Odisha has never enacted a uniform compulsory marriage registration law. Instead, it has passed religion-specific registration rules, including the Orissa Hindu Marriages Registration Rules, 1960 and the Orissa Muhammedan Marriages & Divorces Registration Rules, 1976, both of which were amended in 2006 to bring their wording into line with the Supreme Court ruling. These measures created local registrars that issue marriage licenses to prospective spouses. Registrars may refuse to issue licenses if the parties fail to meet the requirements to marry under the federal marriage laws. Although they do not explicitly forbid same-sex marriages, both regulations generally refer to married spouses as "man" and "woman".

Traditional Odia marriages (ବାହାଘର, bahaghara) are deeply rooted in custom and hold significant cultural importance. They involve elaborate pre-wedding preparations and culminate in key rituals, including the kanyadana and the saptapadi. Arranged marriage remains the prevailing norm across India, accounting for the vast majority of unions, and often placing pressure on LGBT individuals to marry partners of the opposite sex. Nevertheless, some same-sex couples have participated in traditional marriage ceremonies, although these unions lack legal recognition in Odisha. In November 2006, two Khond women, Bateka Palang and Maleka Nilsa, were married "in a traditional ceremony, in the presence of family" in a rural town in the Koraput district. Following the traditional custom of bride price, the gāṭi muḍa (Kui: ଗାଟି ମୁଡ), traditionally paid by the groom to the parents of the bride, Bateka's family gave a cow and wine to Maleka's family. Bateka's mother was quoted as saying, "We resisted their marriage because it was against our tradition. But they were in no mood to listen and eloped. Finally, we were compelled to get them married according to our tradition. I have accepted Maleka as my daughter-in-law." Two women were also married in a temple in Talcher in July 2018 "causing outrage among the villagers and ostracisation of their own families". A lesbian couple, Sabitri Parida and Monalisa Nayak, were married in a traditional Hindu ceremony in Kendrapara in January 2019. The parents of the brides were not supportive of their relationship, and Noyak's father issued a statement alleging that "his daughter [was] innocent and [was] under a spell of black magic", urging police to separate the couple. The couple left to Bhubaneswar to avoid family harassment.

=== Live-in relationships ===
Recognition of same-sex unions in India

Live-in relationships (Odia: ସହବାସ ସମ୍ପର୍କ, sahabāsa samparka, pronounced [ˈsɔhɔbasɔ ˈsɔmpɔɾkɔ], or ଲିଭ୍-ଇନ୍ ସମ୍ପର୍କ, libh-in samparka; Santali: ᱥᱟᱶᱛᱮ ᱛᱟᱦᱮᱱ ᱥᱚᱢᱵᱚᱱᱫᱷ, saw̃te tahen sômbôndh, or ᱞᱤᱵ-ᱤᱱ ᱨᱤᱞᱮᱥᱟᱱᱥᱤᱯ, liv-in rilesansip) are not illegal in Odisha. The Indian Supreme Court has held that adults have a constitutional right to live together without being married, that police cannot interfere with consenting adults living together, and that live-in relationships are not unlawful. The Orissa High Court upheld this constitutional right in a notable judgment in August 2020, and further ruled that if a couple faces threats from family or the community they may request police protection. However, live-in relationships do not confer all the legal rights and benefits of marriage.

In August 2020, the High Court ruled in Chinmayee Jena v. State of Odisha that same-sex live-in relationships are recognised under the constitutional right to life and equality. The court heard a habeas corpus plea filed by Sonu Krishna Jena, a transgender man, whose partner had been kidnapped by her family and forced into marriage with another man. The family argued that their daughter would eventually "envision a change of heart" and had "taken a path that diverges from societal norms". Citing the Supreme Court's ruling in National Legal Services Authority v. Union of India, which affirmed fundamental rights for transgender individuals, and Navtej Singh Johar v. Union of India, which decriminalised homosexuality in India, the Orissa High Court ruled that the couple had the right to live together and continue their relationship, regardless of gender. It held that their relationship was permissible under the fundamental rights to life, equality and equal protection guaranteed by Article 21 of the Constitution. The court also held that women in live-in relationships are protected under the Protection of Women from Domestic Violence Act, 2005, similarly to different-sex cohabiting couples. Further, the court ordered police protection and state support for the couple's rights under the Constitution of India. Chinmayee Jena was one of the first high court decisions in India recognising the rights of same-sex live-in relationships.

=== Transgender and intersex issues ===
Like most of South Asia, Odisha recognizes a traditional third gender community known as hijra (ହିନ୍ଜଡା, hinjaḍā), historically holding respected community roles, and known for their distinct culture, communities led by gurus, and traditional roles as performers. There are also terms for eunuchs or transgender individuals in the languages of the various Scheduled Tribes of Odisha, namely meluṛa (ମେଲୁଡ଼) in Kui, cakra (ᱪᱟᱠᱨᱟ) in Santali, kā pē'jani'i (𑣌𑣁𑣁 𑣘𑣈𑣈𑣄𑣎𑣁𑣐𑣓𑣄𑣓) in Ho, paɖu (ପଡୁ) in Juang, anɗari (ଅନ୍ଦରି) in Gtaʼ, and terwa (ତେର୍ୱ) in Bonda; however, this does not in itself demonstrate that a third gender category existed in their cultures or that there were ritual or kinship roles for such individuals. The Supreme Court's 2023 ruling in Supriyo v. Union of India held that the Indian Constitution does not require the legalisation of same-sex marriages but affirmed that transgender people may marry opposite-sex partners. Such a marriage had already occurred in Narla in September 2022 between a man and a transgender woman. However, the marriage lacked legal recognition because the man was already married to a third party, who reportedly approved of the bigamous marriage.

== See also ==
- LGBT rights in India
- Recognition of same-sex unions in India
- Supriyo v. Union of India
