= Chanchal Bhattacharya v. State of West Bengal =

- Court: Calcutta High Court
- Full case name: Chanchal Bhattacharyya versus State of West Bengal & Ors.
- Decided: 28 January 2016
- Citation: W.P. No. 30295 of 2015

Court membership
- Judge sitting: Dipankar Datta, J.

Case opinions
- Individuals who have undergone Gender-affirming surgery (referred to as sex reassignment surgery in the case) have a constitutional right to the recognition of their affirmed gender.; Educational and administrative institutions should adjust their records to reflect such changes, aiming to prevent inconvenience or discrimination.
- Decision by: Dipankar Datta J.

Keywords
- Transgender Rights, Legal Recognition of Transgender People, Gender-affirming Surgery

Chanchal Bhattacharya versus State of West Bengal & Ors. (2015), a decision of the Calcutta High Court, asserts that individuals who have undergone gender-affirming surgery (referred to as sex reassignment surgery in the case) have a constitutional right to the recognition of their affirmed gender. The verdict emphasized the importance for educational and administrative institutions to adjust their records to reflect such changes, aiming to prevent inconvenience or discrimination.

The Supreme Court of India acknowledged this case in its publication titled "Sensitisation Module for the Judiciary on LGBTIQA+ Community" as one of the High Court judgments that effectively addressed the difficulties and obstacles experienced by queer individuals within the justice system due to their systemic marginalization.

== Background ==
The individual named 'Tamal,' who was assigned female at birth and originally named 'Tamali,' was born in 1991 to the petitioner and his spouse. Tamal attended a girls' high school in Kolkata and passed exams conducted by the West Bengal Board of Secondary Education and the West Bengal Council of Higher Secondary Education.

Tamal exhibited behaviors that differed from their assigned gender from an early age and eventually came to identify as male. Due to his gender incongruence (referred to as gender identity disorder in the case), Tamal consulted multiple healthcare professionals and underwent gender-affirming surgery (referred to as sex reassignment surgery in the case) in February 2014, successfully transitioning to male and adopting the name 'Tamal.' An affidavit confirming this change was sworn before a Judicial Magistrate.

The petitioner sought to update Tamal's name and gender on their school records, including admit cards, registration certificates, and mark sheets issued by the Board and the Council. The President of the Council did not take any action, while the Administrator of the Board rejected the request on October 13, 2015. The Administrator's decision referred to National Legal Services Authority v. Union of India (2014) to justify the rejection, indicating that Tamal's status should align with the concept of "Third Gender."

Tamal's father, the petitioner challenged the decision of the Board in the Calcutta High Court.

== Proceedings ==
The petitioner's counsel invoked the Supreme Court's decision in National Legal Services Authority v. Union of India (2014) and the judgments of the Madras High Court in S Swapna v. State of Tamil Nadu (2014) and K Prithika Yashini v. State of Tamil Nadu (2015), contending that the Administrator of the Board made an error in rejecting the petitioner's request.

The counsel representing the West Bengal Board of Secondary Education contested the petitioner's request for corrections, asserting that there was no legal obligation for such amendments due to the absence of a statutory requirement. He contended that providing a new certificate could potentially lead to questions about how a male individual completed education at a girls' school.

The Bench sought input from the State Government of West Bengal to aid in issuing an appropriate order. The counsel, representing the State Government of West Bengal, acknowledged that there was no specific statutory provision empowering the Administrator of the Board or the President of the Council to effect the requested changes. However, he noted that guidance could be drawn from the discussions within the National Legal Services Authority v. Union of India (2014) case and argued that individuals have a constitutional right to the recognition of their affirmed gender following Gender-affirming surgery.

== Opinion of the court ==
The Bench noted that the decisions of the Madras High Court, which the petitioner's counsel relied upon, were not pertinent to the present case, as these decisions addressed non-surgical transgender individuals, whereas the case at hand involves individuals who have undergone gender-affirming surgery.

The Bench reviewed the National Legal Services Authority v. Union of India (2014) case and acknowledged that the verdict did not explicitly address the recognition of affirmed gender after gender-affirming surgery. The Bench acknowledged that while the observations made in the case were not directly binding, they served as a foundation for upholding the constitutional right to acknowledge affirmed gender following surgery. Furthermore, the Bench relied on the observations made in the case that the lack of a statutory regime should not hinder the recognition of gender identity and criticized the Administrator of the Board's reasons for rejecting the petitioner's request.

However, the Bench acknowledged the potential challenges Tamal might face due to the name and gender change on his certificates, which could arise from his previous education in a girls' school, the Bench found that substituting Tamali's name and changing the sex marker on the certificates could cause more harm than good.

The Bench noted that there was no dispute that Tamal and Tamali were the same individual. The Bench overturned the decision made by the Administrator of the Board and instructed that suitable endorsements indicating the recognition of Tamal and Tamali as the same individual, post gender-affirming surgery, should be added to the certificates within a span of four weeks following the receipt of the judgment.

== Legal analysis ==
Dr Surabhi Shukla critiqued the Chanchal Bhattacharya v. State of West Bengal case for linking name and gender changes solely to gender-affirming surgery. She emphasized the National Legal Services Authority v. Union of India (2014) case's directives and argued against any reliance on gender-affirming surgery as both unlawful and ethically questionable. Instead, Shukla advocated the court's reference to the self-determination principle established in the National Legal Services Authority case.

Dr. Surabhi Shukla offered a different perspective, suggesting that the court should have acknowledged Tamal's identification with a different gender than the one on record. Citing the National Legal Services Authority v. Union of India (2014) case, which affirms the right of transgender individuals to self-identify, Dr. Surabhi Shukla proposed that the court should have recognized that doctor's certificates provided by Tamal aren't a prerequisite for declaring gender identity. Tamal's self-identified gender should be accepted, and the court should have ordered a corresponding change in his records.

While the Supreme Court of India recognized this case in its publication "Sensitisation Module for the Judiciary on LGBTIQA+ Community" as a key instance of a High Court addressing systemic challenges faced by queer individuals within the justice system, it's worth noting that the publication mainly discusses the Bench's observation that the administrator made an error by denying the petitioner's request and the directive to change name and gender on various documents.

== See also ==
- LGBT rights in India
- Chinmayee Jena v. State of Odisha (2020)
- National Legal Services Authority v. Union of India (2014)
