= Transgender Persons (Protection of Rights) Amendment Act, 2026 =

Bill of the Parliament of India

Parliament of India
- Long title: An Act to amend the Transgender Persons (Protection of Rights) Act, 2019.
- Citation: Act No. 3 of 2026
- Passed by: Lok Sabha
- Passed: 24 March 2026
- Considered by: Rajya Sabha
- Passed: 25 March 2026
- Assented to by: Droupadi Murmu
- Assented to: 30 March 2026

Legislative history

Initiating chamber: Lok Sabha
- Bill title: Transgender Persons (Protection of Rights) Amendment Bill, 2026
- Bill citation: Bill No. 79 of 2026
- Introduced by: Virendra Kumar Khatik, Union Social Justice and Empowerment Minister
- Introduced: 13 March 2026
- Passed: 24 March 2026

Revising chamber: Rajya Sabha
- Passed: 25 March 2026

Amends
- Transgender Persons (Protection of Rights) Act, 2019
- Status: Not yet in force

The Transgender Persons (Protection of Rights) Amendment Act, 2026, is a piece of legislation in India that was enacted to amend the Transgender Persons (Protection of Rights) Act, 2019. Introduced in the Parliament of India on 13 March 2026, the act aims to revise the procedures for legal gender recognition and the issuance of identity certificates for transgender individuals. The act has generated significant debate regarding the balance between preventing the misuse of welfare benefits and upholding the right to self-determined identity established by the Supreme Court of India in the 2014 National Legal Services Authority v. Union of India (NALSA v. UOI) judgment. The Bill was passed in the Lok Sabha on 24 March, in the Rajya Sabha on 25 March and by the President on 30 March 2026. It is yet to be enforced by the Central Government.

== Background ==
The 2019 Act allowed transgender individuals to obtain a "transgender certificate" based on their self-perceived identity, through the Transgender Certificate and Identity Cards scheme. The 2026 Amendment Act proposes to change this by making medical scrutiny a mandatory prerequisite for any legal recognition of transgender status.

== Key provisions ==
The 2026 act introduces several structural changes to the process of obtaining identity documents:

- The act drastically narrows the definition of transgender by only including socio-cultural identities (such as kinner, hijra, aravani, or jogta), some of which are related primarily to Hinduism and intersex people. The act also removes from the definition previously recognised transgender categories such as trans men, trans women, genderqueer people and others whose gender does not align with their gender assigned at birth whether or not they have undergone hormone replacement therapy or gender reassignment surgery.
- The act mandates the formation of medical boards at the state or union territory level to verify an applicant's claim. The district magistrate (DM) would only issue an identity certificate after a recommendation from the medical board. The DM now has the discretion to then consult further 'medical experts' and make their decision on the application. This replaces the previous system where the DM issued certificates upon request.
- The act introduces new crimes with harsh punishments (cognizable and non-bailable), if anyone kidnaps, causes grievous hurt (defined as including castration, surgery or hormone therapy), and by force, deceit, allurement or undue influence causes someone to present a transgender identity. A second set of crimes targets those who by force, deceit, allurement or undue influence cause someone to present a transgender identity and employs them for soliciting, begging, bonded labour or other forms of servitude.
- Hospitals are mandated to report gender-affirming surgery to the respective district magistrate and medical board. The patient is also mandated to apply for a new certificate with the 'male' or 'female' gender marker post-surgery.

== Government rationale ==
The Government of India has stated that the amendments are necessary to prevent the "misuse" of the law. Officials argue that a formal verification process ensures that affirmative action measures and specific welfare schemes reach "genuine" beneficiaries rather than those misrepresenting their identity for personal gain.

== Criticism ==
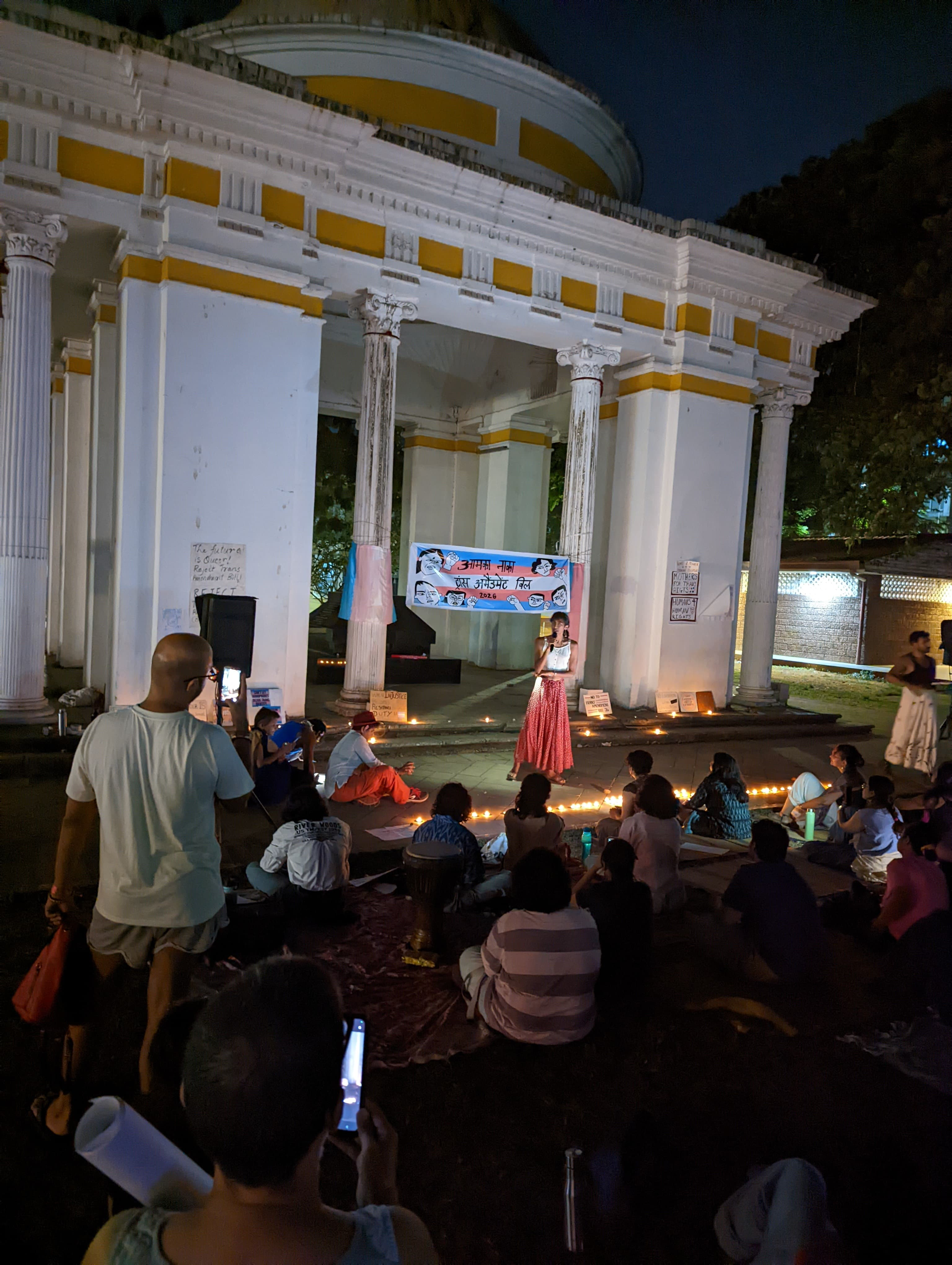
Protests against the Bill in Goa. The banner reads "Amka Naka Trans Amendment Bill 2026" ("We Don't Want Trans Amendment Bill 2026")

The bill has faced criticism from activists and members of the transgender community. Critics argue that mandatory medical examinations pathologise transgender identities and violate the principle of self-identification recognised in the NALSA (2014) ruling. Human rights advocates have described the verification process as an invasion of privacy and a potential source of humiliation for applicants. Several members of the National Council for Transgender Persons (NCTP) have publicly opposed the bill, claiming the draft was kept confidential and that the council was not consulted during its formulation.

Activists criticised the new criminal clauses in the Bill, stating that this had the possibility to allow for further criminalisation of consensual medical care. The provisions on abduction, while intended to prevent abuse, were criticised by transgender advocates for reinforcing negative tropes about the transgender community. Further, it discourages doctors from providing advice and guidance on gender-reaffirming surgery, since it could lead to jail time. Further, medical groups condemned the amendment, stating that it is "scientifically inaccurate, medically unsound, and incompatible with contemporary standards of transgender healthcare".

In February and March 2026, protests against the bill were reported at Jantar Mantar in New Delhi, where activists demanded the restoration of self-identification rights. Protests were led by Anish Gawande from the NCP, the CPI(M) and the Students' Federation of India. By late March 2026, protests were reported across India. On social media, people protested with the hashtag #RejectTransBill2026.

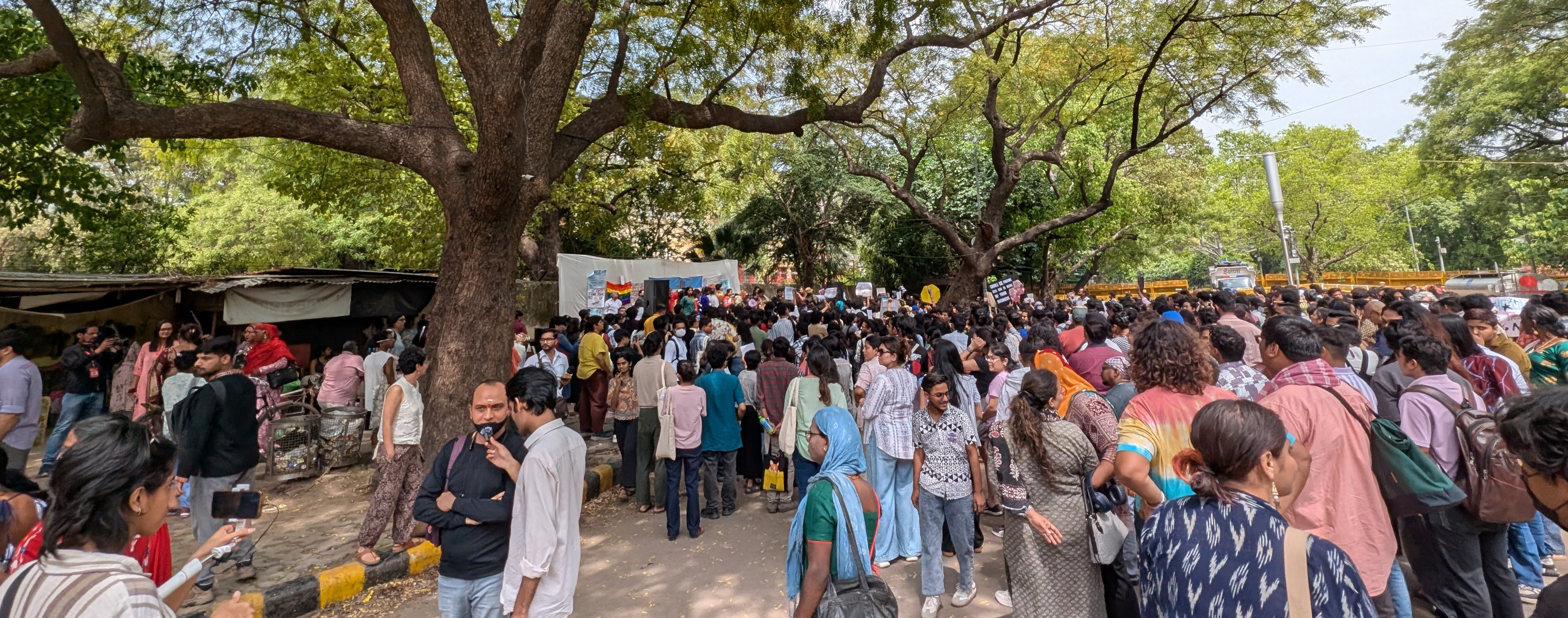
Protest against the Bill at Jantar Mantar on 29th Of March, 2026

=== Reactions ===
Shashi Tharoor called the bill a "deeply regressive proposal" in Parliament in March 2026. The CPI(M) released an official statement, calling the Bill an "assault on the constitutional rights of transgender persons and must be withdrawn forthwith." After the Bill was passed by voice vote in the Lok Sabha on 24 March 2026, MPs from opposition parties walked out. These included Samajwadi Party, Congress, Shiv Sena (UBT), DMK, CPI(M), Trinamool Congress, and the Nationalist Congress Party.

== Constitutional Challenge before the Courts ==
On May 4, 2026, the Supreme Court of India issued notices to the Central government and all States regarding petitions challenging the Act's constitutional validity. Despite the ongoing challenge, the Supreme Court has refused to stay the operation of the law for now. A total of 9 petitions were filed under Article 32 of the Constitution.

== See also ==
- LGBTQ rights in India
- Human rights in India
