= Kothi (gender) =

Type of transgender in India

In the Indian subcontinent, a kothi is a term for a man or boy who takes on an "effeminate" role in same-sex relationships, often with a desire to be the receptive partner in sexual intercourse. The origins of the term are unclear. The original meaning was intended as a slur, similar to "fag" or "sissy." Local equivalents include durani (Kolkata), menaka (Cochin), meti (Nepal), and zenana (Pakistan). The male partners who perform the penetrative acts are known as panthi.

Kothis differ from hijras as they do not live in the kind of intentional communities that hijras usually live in. They are similar to the hijra in that they may take a same-sex lover for a period of time, and they may perform sexual favors for men through prostitution.

Other sources state that the term kothi is an all-encompassing term for males in India who do not conform to their social gender, where the term kothi would include the identity of hijra, among others.

== See also ==
- Tamil sexual minorities
