= Hijra (South Asia) =

Third gender of South Asian cultures

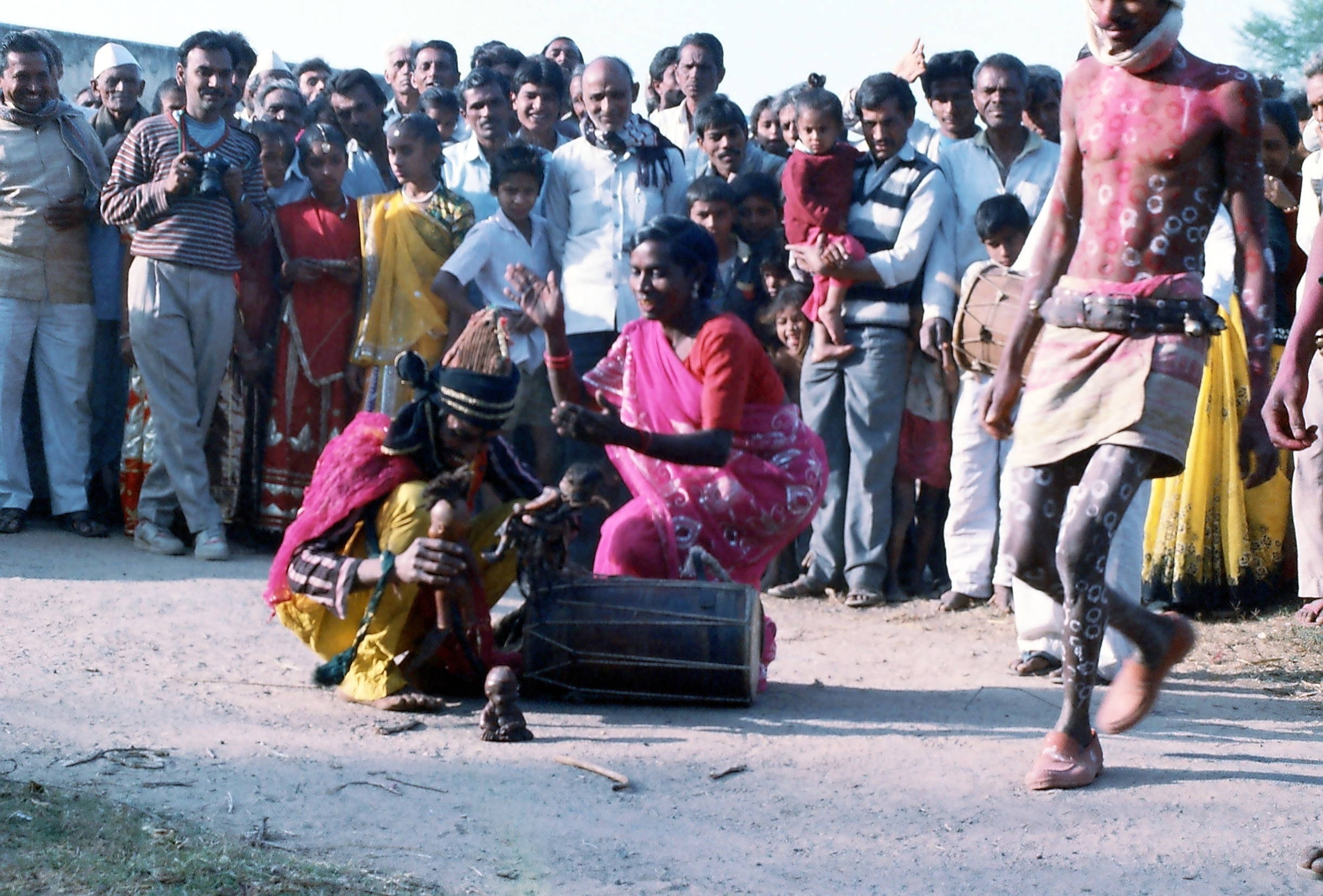
- A hijra in a traditional village performance
- Meaning: Umbrella term for people who are the third gender (transgender, intersex, or eunuchs)
- Classification: Gender identity

Other terms
- Synonyms: Aravani, Jagappa, Kinnar, Khawaja Sira, Khadra, Moorat, Maugiya, Fulumulu, Singaru
- Associated terms: Kothi, Third gender, Trans woman, Meti

Demographics
- Culture: South Asian
Regions with significant populations
- Indian subcontinent
- India: 488,000+–7 million+
- Bangladesh: 10,000–50,000 (2020)
- Pakistan: 21,700+–500,000+
- Nepal: 30,500+–35,200+

Legal information
- Recognition: Yes (India, Bangladesh and Pakistan)
- Protection: Limited

In South Asia, hijra (Note: Hindi: हिजड़ा, pronounced [ˈɦɪdʒɽa]; Urdu: ہیجڑا; Bengali: হিজড়া; Kannada: ಹಿಜಡಾ; Telugu: హిజ్రా; Punjabi: ਹਿਜੜਾ; Odia: ହିନ୍ଜଡା. Other terms include: ਖੁਸਰਾ / کھسرا, khusrā (Punjabi); ख़वाजा सरा / خواجہ سرا, k͟hawāja sarā (Hindi and Urdu); खदड़ा / کدڙا, khadṛā (Sindhi).) are transgender, intersex, or eunuch people who live in communities that follow a kinship system known as the guru–chela system. They are also known as aravani and aruvani, and, in Pakistan, khawaja sira. Hijra is officially recognised as a third gender throughout countries in the Indian subcontinent, being considered neither completely male nor female.

The word hijra is a Hindustani word. It has traditionally been translated into English as "eunuch" or "hermaphrodite", where "the irregularity of the male genitalia is central to the definition". However, in general, hijras have been assigned male at birth, with few being intersex. Hijras' identity originates in ancient Hinduism and evolved during the Delhi Sultanate (1206–1526) and under the Mughal Empire (1526–1707).

In the 21st century, many hijras live in well-defined and organised all-hijra communities, led by a guru. Over generations, these communities have consisted of those who are in abject poverty or who have been rejected by or fled their family of origin. Some hijras undergo an initiation rite into the hijra community called nirvaan, which involves the removal of the penis, scrotum, and testicles. Many of them are sex workers.

Today, Nepal, Pakistan, India, and Bangladesh have all legally accepted the existence of a third gender, with India, Pakistan, and Nepal including an option for them on passports and certain official documents.

However, despite legal recognition as a third gender in countries like India, contemporary sociological research, such as the 2026 study Trans People in India: A Decade after NALSA, indicates that the Hijra community continues to face "implementational disenfranchisement." Researchers argue that while the 2014 NALSA judgment provided a constitutional framework, severe bureaucratic gatekeeping—especially regarding identity certification under the 2019 Act—still restricts the community from fully accessing mandated social security and economic integration.

== Terminology ==
The Hindi word hijra may alternately be romanized as hijira, hijda, hijada, hijara, or hijrah. Another such term is khasuaa (खसुआ) or khusaraa (खुसरा). These terms are generally considered derogatory in Urdu and the term Khwaja Sara is used instead. Khwaja Sara is sometimes seen as a more respectable term and has been reclaimed by the community given its precolonial origins and more accepted status within Pakistani society.

A number of terms across the culturally and linguistically diverse Indian subcontinent represent similar sex or gender categories. While these are rough synonyms, they may be better understood as separate identities due to regional cultural differences. In Odia, a hijra is referred to as hinjida or hinjda, in Tamil as ali, aravanni, aravani or aruvani (often considered derogatory, and have been supplanted by in-community terms rejecting the concept of hijra for a broader trans identity, such as thirunangai (திருநங்கை; "respected woman"), thirunambi (திருநம்பி; "respected man") and thirunar (திருனர்; "respected person") for trans woman, man, and person, respectively), in Punjabi as khusra or jankha, in Kannada as mangalamukhi (ಮಂಗಳಮುಖಿ), in Sindhi as khadro (کدڙو), and in Gujarati as pavaiyaa (પાવૈયા). In Bengali, hijra is called hijra (হিজড়া), hijla, hijre, hizra, or hizre. In Konkani, they are known as hizddem or hizdô. In Nepal, third gender people are called by terms such as maugiya, singaru and fulumulu.

In North India, the goddess Bahuchara Mata is worshipped by the hijra community in North India. In South India, the goddess Renuka is believed to have the power to change one's sex. Male devotees in female clothing are known as jogappa. They perform similar roles to hijra, such as dancing and singing at birth ceremonies and weddings.

The word kothi (or koti) is common across India, although kothis are often distinguished from hijras. Kothis are regarded as feminine men or boys who take a feminine role in sex with men, but do not live in the kind of intentional communities in which hijras usually live. Additionally, not all kothis have undergone initiation rites or body modification steps to become a hijra. Local equivalents include durani (Kolkata), menaka (Cochin), meti (Nepal), and zenana (Pakistan).

Hijra used to be translated in English as "eunuch" or "hermaphrodite", although LGBT historians and human rights activists have sought to include hijras as transgender. In a series of meetings convened between October 2013 and January 2014 by the transgender experts committee of India's Ministry of Social Justice and Empowerment, hijra and other trans activists asked that the term "eunuch" be discontinued from usage in government documents, as it is not a term with which the communities identify. The term has been compared to those of mustarjil and mukhannath.

== Gender and sexuality ==
A common misconception of many in Indian society is that all hijra are intersex, asexual, and impotent. This is not fully accurate, as many hijra are sexually active, in relationships, or partake in sex work. In India, some Hijras do not define themselves by specific sexual orientation but rather by renouncing sexuality altogether. However, these notions can come in conflict with the practical, which is that hijras are often employed as prostitutes. Furthermore, in India a feminine male who takes a "receptive" role in sex with a man will often identify as a kothi (or the local equivalent term). While kothis are usually distinguished from hijras as a separate gender identity, they often dress as women and act in a feminine manner in public spaces, even using feminine language to refer to themselves and each other. The usual partners of hijras and kothis are men who consider themselves heterosexual, as they are the ones who penetrate. These male partners are often married, and any relationships or sex with "kothis" or hijras are usually kept secret from the community at large. Some hijras may form relationships with men and even marry, although their marriage is not usually recognised by law or religion. Hijras and kothis often have a name for these masculine sexual or romantic partners; for example, panthi in Bangladesh, giriya in Delhi, or sridhar in Cochin. A 2015 study found that self-identified panthi participants reported their sexual orientation as bisexual but otherwise aligned with male-typical in other study measures. Identification as hijra, kothi, and panthi can be distinguished from Western categories, as they go beyond sexual attraction (such as gay, lesbian, or bisexual in the West) to also include gender roles/presentation and preference in sexual position.

A qualitative, interview-based study found that those who fall under the umbrella of being hijra tend to identify with certain 'schools of thought', including Khusrapan and Zananapan. These terms refer to categories of hijra functioning. Those who follow Khusrapan identify with being a hermaphrodite, denouncing sex work while believing that the ancient practices of bestowing prayers and blessings are to be depended on for sustenance. In contrast, the Zananapan school of thought has followers who may be born biologically male but identify with being a woman through their appearance and lifestyle. They often turn to begging or sex work as a consequence of social exclusion. Many transfeminine activists in Indian communities reject being considered as a third gender, saying that it's a term that is assigned to trans women even if they do not consider themselves a third gender.

== History ==
=== Ancient era ===
The ancient Indian erotic book Kama Sutra mentions the performance of fellatio by feminine people of a third sex (tritiya prakriti). This passage has been variously interpreted as referring to men who desired other men, so-called eunuchs ("those disguised as males, and those that are disguised as females"), male and female trans people ("the male takes on the appearance of a female and the female takes on the appearance of the male"), or two kinds of biological males, one dressed as a woman, the other as a man. Furthermore, in the Puranas, three kinds of devas, or divine beings of music and dance, were identified. These included apsaras, gandharvas, and kinnars, with the former two referring to female and male, while the latter refers to 'neuters'. Additionally, the early writings of the Manu Smriti explained the biological origin of the sexes, identifying a third sex that could result if there was an equal prevalence of male and female 'seed'.

=== Islamic era ===
Hijra identity and culture are documented to have evolved during the Delhi Sultanate (1206–1526) and Mughal Empire (1526–1707), where hijras held esteemed positions as servants for royal and aristocratic households, primarily as guardians and servants for harems, and in administrative positions. Due to their proximity to the elite, the Hijras themselves rose to high ranks, becoming military commanders, political advisors, revenue collectors (mansabdars), etc. Rulers of kingdoms such as Awadh and Maratha often had hijras participate in royal courts and religious ceremonies, and hijras were granted varsasans (cash allowances) and imams (rent-free land grants).

Franciscan travelers in the 1650s noted the presence of "men and boys who dress like women" roaming the streets of Thatta, Sindh (in what is now modern Pakistan). The presence of these individuals was interpreted as a sign of the city's depravity.

The hijras/eunuchs who served the sultanates and empires were often slaves that were forcibly or coercively castrated. The number of such eunuch slaves was always few, as the eunuchs were considered the most expensive and elite kinds of slaves that exclusively met the demand of Royalty and Nobility.

=== British colonialism and the anti-Hijra campaign (1858–1947) ===
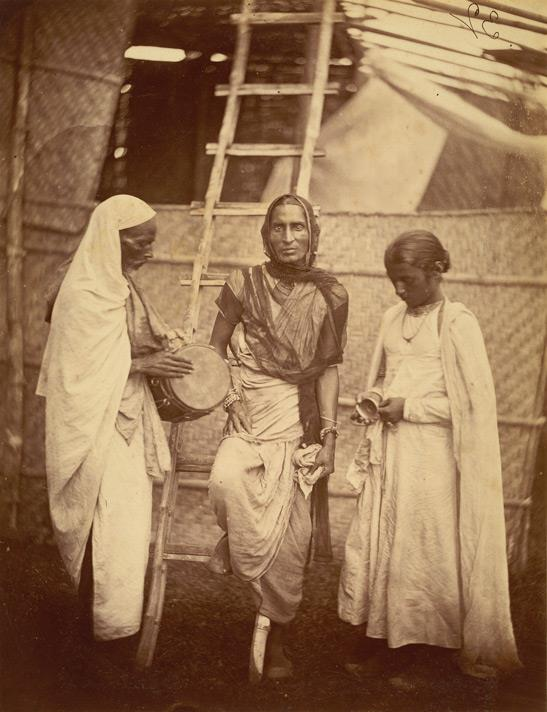
Hijra and companions in Eastern Bengal, modern-day Bangladesh, 1860

During the British Raj, hijras were subjected to various restrictions and intensive state-sponsored discrimination. Beginning in the 1850s, colonial authorities deployed various strategies to end hijra practices, which they saw as "a breach of public decency" and incapable of "moral transformation," as part of their influence on colonial-era sexuality in India. Colonial concern can be traced to 1852 murder of a hijra named Bhoorah in Mainpuri district. During the trials British judges portrayed hijras as beggars, cross-dressers and prostitutes. Historian Jessica Hinchy describes the response as a "moral panic". By 1870, no high-ranking British officials argued against the implementation of special legislation to address the "hijra problem", thus solidifying an anti-hijra campaign all across the Indian subcontinent. Anti-hijra laws were enacted, including a law outlawing castration, a marginal practice of the hijra community, although it was rarely enforced. The community was included in the Criminal Tribes Act (1871), subject to registration, monitoring and stigmatisation.

Although hijras were already criminalised by Section 377 of the Indian Penal Code, in 1861, authorities of the North-Western Provinces (NWP) sought to enact a "special law" against hijras. Because of economic costs, hijras and other so-called "criminal tribes" were unable to be collectively sequestered from colonial society. British Lieutenant-Governor Edmund Drummond (1814–1895) framed the anti-hijra campaign as a necessary project. Hijras were monitored with the hope of ending hijra practices. Since the passage of the Criminal Tribes Act (1871), hijras could not possess children. This law also prevented the initiation—castration—as the administrators argued that hijra children did not or could not consent to it. Police registers described hijras as criminals and sexually deviant. Hijras were forbidden to wear women's clothing and jewellery or to perform in public. The police reportedly cut the hair and stripped the offenders, though the extent of the violence by police is unclear.

=== Post-colonial era (1947–present) ===
Hijra communities remain throughout modern states of Pakistan, India, Nepal and Bangladesh, although they continue to face social marginalisation and police abuse. In the late 20th and early 21st centuries, hijras became the subject of more attention, being the focus of numerous documentaries, news features, ethnographies, monographs and dissertations. Gayatri Reddy writes that in the 21st century, hijras have also been 'mainstreamed' into popular films: "given this history of near invisibility, the recent attention focused on hijras has been unsettling for both hijras and non-hijras."

Since the late 20th century, some hijra activists and non-government organizations have lobbied for official recognition of the hijra as a kind of "third sex" or "third gender", neither man nor woman. In Bangladesh, hijras were recognised as a third gender in 2013 by the government and are eligible for priority in education and certain kinds of low-paid jobs, though the government never defined the term. In India, however, the Supreme Court in April 2014 recognised hijras, transgender people, eunuchs, and intersex people as a "third gender" in law.

== Social status and economic circumstances ==
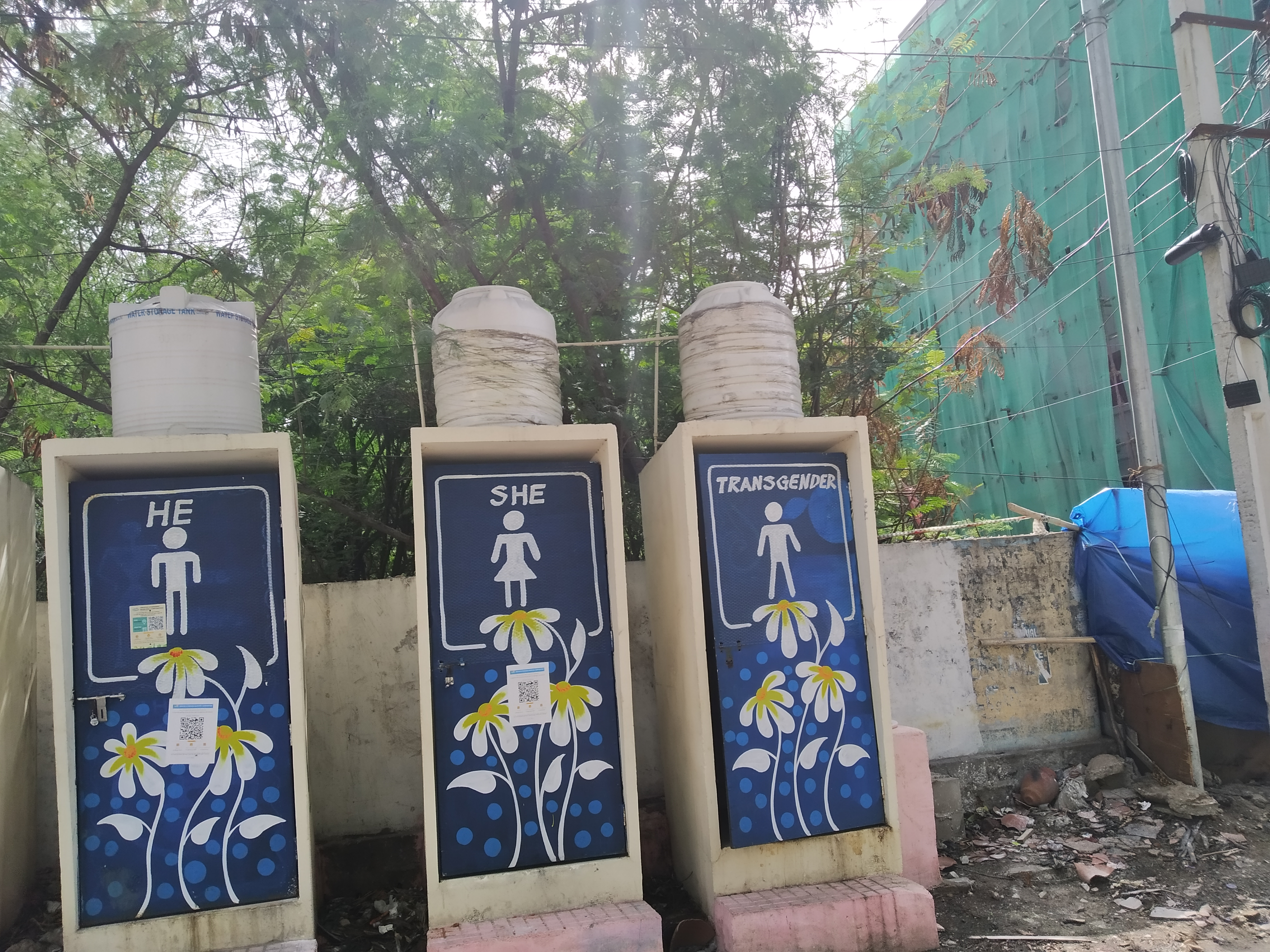
Male, female and hijra public toilets in India

Most hijras live at the margins of society with very low status; the very word "hijra" is sometimes used in a derogatory manner. The Indian lawyer and author Rajesh Talwar has written a book, titled The Third Sex and Human Rights, highlighting the human rights abuses suffered by the community. Few employment opportunities are available to hijras. Many get their income from performing at ceremonies (toli), begging (dheengna), or prostitution ('raarha')—an occupation of eunuchs also recorded in premodern times. Violence against hijras, especially those who are prostitutes, is often brutal, and occurs in public spaces, police stations, prisons, and their homes. As with transgender people in most of the world, they face extreme discrimination in health, housing, education, employment, immigration, law, and any bureaucracy that is unable to place them into male or female gender categories.

== Community ==
The hijra community is made up of large groups of hijras from different areas forming hierarchical lineages or gharanas. A naayak is the head and primary decision maker for a gharana, determining policies for the community. Falling under naayaks are gurus (lit. "teachers"). Gurus are above community members and regulate daily life in their space (known as a dera). The followers of a guru are called chelas. Traditionally, teachers and their disciples use these terms in many domains such as religious learning; however, they bear specific meaning in hijra communities as being about cultural learning—hijra chelas are taught about hijra customs by their guru. These communities reflect similarities to Western notions of found family.

In these communities, the hijras usually refer to each other in feminine terms. Thus, they refer to their relations as sisters with those who fall around their age range or aunt with those older than them, and so on.

=== Housing ===
In October 2013, Pakistani Christians and Muslims (Shia and Sunni) put pressure on the landlords of Imamia Colony to evict any transgender residents. I. A. Rehman, the director of the Human Rights Commission of Pakistan, said, "Generally in Pakistan, Khwaja Sira are not under threat. But they are in Khyber Pakhtunkhwa Province because of a 'new Islam' under way."

=== Healthcare ===
The social status of hijra in society plays a part in their difficulty accessing healthcare services as physicians will turn hijra clients away, saying their presence will disturb other clients. Hijra have to hide their identities or can not disclose illnesses such as STIs. Most medical practitioners are also not well educated and informed enough on hijra or sexuality, further contributing to this issue. Social exclusion of the hijra also has some severe consequences for their health.

Hijra in Dhaka, Bangladesh were found to have the highest syphilis rates out of all at-risk groups in the city. In a study of Bangladeshi hijras, participants reported not being allowed to seek healthcare at the private chambers of doctors, and experiencing abuse if they go to government hospitals.

In 2008, HIV prevalence was 27.6% amongst hijra sex workers in Larkana, Pakistan. The general prevalence of HIV among the adult Pakistani population is estimated at 0.1%.

The aforementioned social inequalities and medical negligence also make hijra sex workers a more vulnerable population to HIV. Sex work increases the worker's vulnerability to violence, and protection is not usually used in coerced sex, increasing the risk of direct exposure to HIV. 40% of the sample in a Pakistani study on HIV reported experiencing forced sex or abuse. Additionally, of this sample, 58% of participants had STIs, the most common being syphilis and gonorrhoea.

An Indian study consisting of 68 transgender participants reported that respondents expressed having intense feelings of low self-worth, shame, depression, and suicidal thoughts, internalizing the negative views the society around them holds. Many hijra experience a lack of a support system, facing rejection from family members or difficulties in terms of maintaining steady relationships with romantic partners. This rejection from society contributes to struggles with mental health as well as trans sex workers feeling obligated to accept the violence and stigmas they are subject to.

=== Criminalization of sexuality ===
After India's Supreme Court re-criminalized homosexual sex on 11 December 2013, there was a sharp increase in physical, psychological, and sexual violence against the transgender community by the Indian Police Service, which often does not investigate reports of sexual assault against them.

On 15 April 2014, the Supreme Court of India decriminalized same-sex sexual activity between consenting parties in its ruling in National Legal Services Authority v. Union of India.

On 6 September 2018, the Supreme Court overturned India's Section 377, which criminalized anal and oral sex.

=== Education and employment ===
In an ethnographic study on the hijra experience in Bangladesh, many hijra recounted childhood experiences of facing abuse and isolation from their peers for presenting as feminine males. Additionally, many hijra reported facing abuse and humiliation from their teachers as well, making school an unfriendly and uncomfortable environment for them. These experiences ultimately resulted in their reluctance to attend school or continue education. This lack of education ends up playing a role in unemployment rates of Hijra. Hijras in Bangladesh also experience sexual harassment and abuse at work, being removed from their jobs when outed as hijra or denied jobs in general. They face accusations of disturbing the workplace environment.

Being turned away from traditional careers, many hijra have become involved in sex work. However, this has its own problems, as hijras face harassment, forced unprotected sex, and assault from clients, but many are not able to report it due to fear of harassment from the police as well.

In 2002, nearly 5,000 people attended the All India Eunuch Conference held in Varanasi; the conference's platform demanded that universities and government open more job opportunities to this population. On 15 April 2014, in National Legal Services Authority v. Union of India, the Supreme Court of India ruled that transgender people should be treated as a third category of gender or as a socially and economically "backward" class entitled to proportional access and representation in education and jobs.

Beginning in 2006, hijras were engaged to accompany Patna city revenue officials to collect unpaid taxes, receiving a 4-percent commission.

== Language ==
The hijra community developed a secret language known as Hijra Farsi. The language has a sentence structure loosely based on Hindi and a unique vocabulary of at least a thousand words. Some of the kinship terms and names for rituals used by the Hindi-speaking Hijra community are different in use from those used by people outside the Hijra community. For example, dādī, the Standard Hindi for paternal grandmother, is used in the Hijra community to address one's guru's guru. Beyond the Urdu-Hindi speaking areas of the subcontinent, the vocabulary is still used by the hijra community within their own native languages.

== In politics of South Asia ==
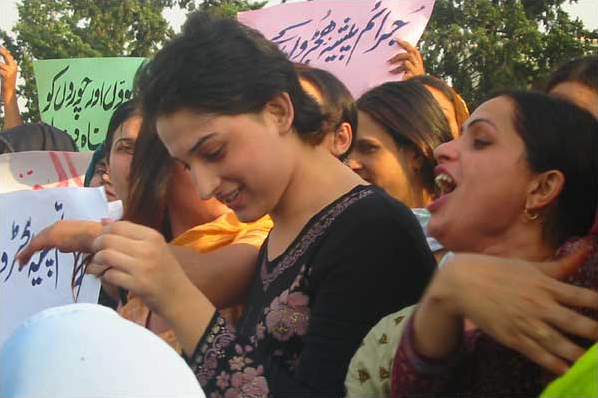
Hijras protesting in Islamabad, the capital of Pakistan

The governments of both India (1994) and Pakistan (2009) have recognised hijras as a "third sex", thus granting them the basic civil rights of every citizen.

In India's 2011 census, residents could mark male, female or "other," adding a third option for the first time. The 2027 census is expected to replace the "other" option with "transgender."

There is also further discrimination from the government. In the 2009 general election, India's election committee denied three hijras candidacy unless they identified themselves as either male or female. In 2013, transgender people in Pakistan were given their first opportunity to stand for election. Sanam Fakir, a 32-year-old hijra, ran as an independent candidate for Sukkur, Pakistan's general election in May.

In April 2014, Justice K. S. Radhakrishnan declared transgender to be the third gender in Indian law in National Legal Services Authority v. Union of India. The ruling said:

Seldom, our society realises or cares to realise the trauma, agony and pain which the members of Transgender community undergo, nor appreciates the innate feelings of the members of the Transgender community, especially of those whose mind and body disown their biological sex. Our society often ridicules and abuses the Transgender community and in public places like railway stations, bus stands, schools, workplaces, malls, theatres, hospitals, they are sidelined and treated as untouchables, forgetting the fact that the moral failure lies in the society's unwillingness to contain or embrace different gender identities and expressions, a mindset which we have to change.

Justice Radhakrishnan said that transgender people should be treated consistently with other minorities under the law, enabling them to access jobs, healthcare, and education. He framed the issue as one of human rights, saying that, "These TGs, even though insignificant in numbers, are still human beings and therefore they have every right to enjoy their human rights", concluding by declaring that:

1. Hijras, Eunuchs, apart from binary gender, be treated as "third gender" for the purpose of safeguarding their rights under Part III of our Constitution and the laws made by the Parliament and the State Legislature.
2. Transgender persons' right to decide their self-identified gender is also upheld and the Centre and State Governments are directed to grant legal recognition of their gender identity such as male, female or as third gender.

A bill supported by all political parties was tabled in Indian parliament to ensure transgender people get benefits akin to reserved communities like SC/STs and is taking steps to see that they get enrollment in schools and jobs in government besides protection from sexual harassment.

In November 2019, the Parliament of India passed the Transgender Persons (Protection of Rights) Bill. The act defines a transgender person as someone whose gender identity doesn't match the gender they were assigned at birth, and it extends to include transgender men, transgender women, intersex people, genderqueer people, and people with socio-cultural gender identities, such as hijras. It prohibits transgender people from being treated unfairly in education, employment, housing, or healthcare. Under the act, a person can apply for a certification from the District Magistrate as legal proof of their transgender identity, which would then be included on other legal documents.

The parliament revisited the bill in March 2026 with the Transgender Persons (Protection of Rights) Amendment Bill, which redefined India's legal recognition of transgender people. The bill limits its definition of transgender people to intersex individuals and those with socio-cultural gender identities, like hijras. It does not recognize the "self-perceived" identities included in the 2019 act. However, it expands to include eunuchs and people who were forced or allured into surgical or chemical procedures, such as emasculation or castration, that caused them to "outwardly present a transgender identity." The 2026 bill also adds that a certification of transgender identity can only be granted by the District Magistrate after it confers with a designated medical board. The changes aim to protect transgender residents from "fakes" who assume the identity for financial gain, according to Medha Kulkarni, a Bharatiya Janata Party member of Parliament.

In the 1990s, about 10,000 people belonged to a national organisation called Treetiya Panthi Sanghatana (TPS). As of 2003, the president was Kajal Nayak. A younger Kajal Nayak, who was 27 years old in 2019, is the president of Jajpur's Transgender Association.

== In Hinduism ==
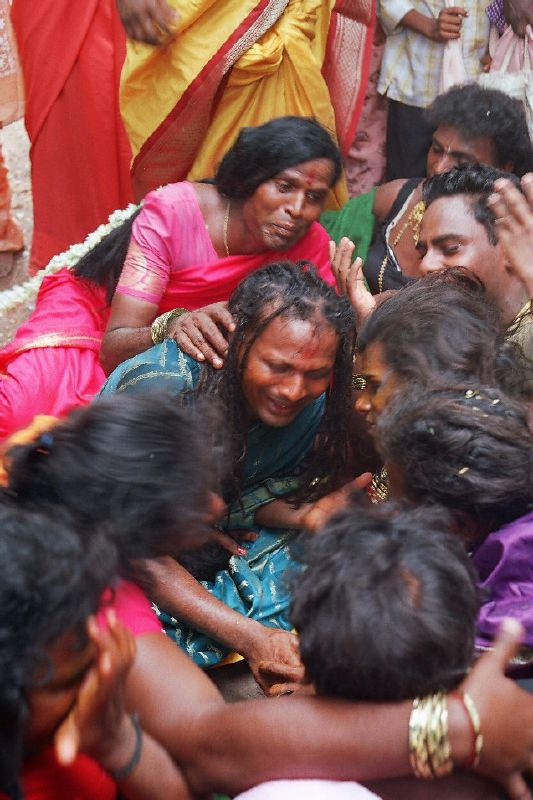
The Indian transgender hijras, or Aravanis, ritually marry the Hindu god Aravan and then mourn his ritual death (seen) in an 18-day festival in Koovagam, India.

Many practise a form of syncretism that draws on multiple religions; seeing themselves to be neither men nor women, hijras practice rituals for both men and women.

They are usually devotees of the mother goddess Bahuchara Mata, Shiva, or both.

=== Bahuchara Mata ===
Bahuchara Mata is a Hindu goddess with two unrelated stories, both associated with transgender behavior. One story is that she appeared in the avatar of a princess who castrated her husband because he would run in the woods and act like a woman rather than have sex with her. Another story is that a man tried to rape her, so she cursed him with impotence. When the man begged her forgiveness to have the curse removed, she relented only after he agreed to run in the woods and act like a woman. The primary temple to this goddess is located in Gujarat, and it is a place of pilgrimage for hijras, who see Bahuchara Mata as a patroness.

=== Ardhanarishvara ===
One of the forms of Shiva is called Ardhanarishvara, a composite representation with one half of the form featuring Parvati. Ardhanarishvara has special significance as a patron of hijras, who identify with the gender ambiguity. According to legend, the sage Bhringi wished to venerate only Shiva, and ignored Parvati, while worshipping and circumambulating him. Agitated, Parvati cursed Bhringi to lose all his flesh and blood, reducing him to a skeleton. In this form Bhringi could not stand erect, so the compassionate ones who witnessed the scene blessed the sage with a third leg for support. As her attempt to humiliate the sage had failed, Parvati punished herself with austerities that pleased Shiva and led him to grant her the boon of uniting with him, thereby compelling Bhringi to worship the divine couple in the form of Ardhanarishvara, a combined form of the deities, believed to integrate the masculine and the feminine.

=== In the Ramayana ===
In some versions of the Ramayana, when Rama leaves Ayodhya for his 14-year exile, a crowd of his subjects follow him into the forest because of their devotion to him. Soon Rama notices this, and gathers them to tell them not to mourn, and that all the "men and women" of his kingdom should return to their places in Ayodhya. Rama then leaves for 14 years. When he returns to Ayodhya, he finds that the hijras, being neither men nor women, have not moved from the place where he gave his speech. Impressed with their devotion, Rama grants hijras the boon to confer blessings on people during auspicious inaugural occasions like childbirth and weddings. Specifically, hijras will perform and bestow their blessings when a child is born. This boon is the origin of badhai, in which hijras sing, dance, and give blessings.

=== In the Mahabharata ===
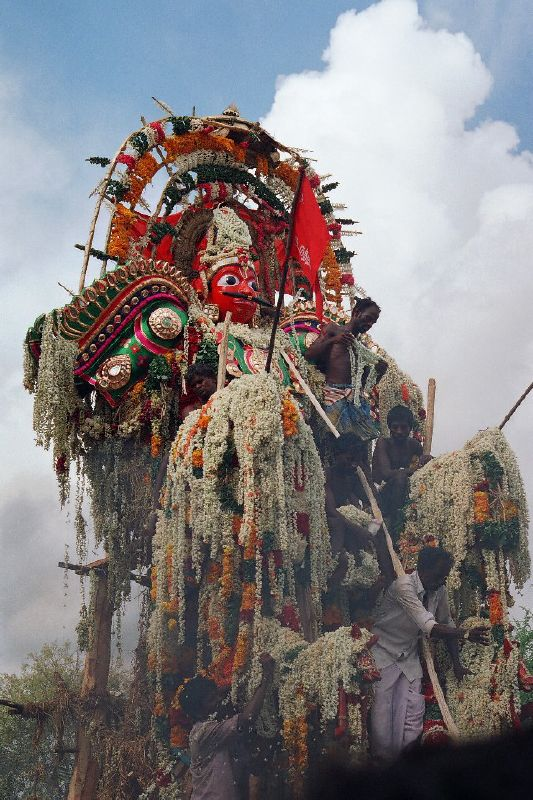
Kuttantavar festival in Koovagam

The Mahabharata includes an episode in which Arjuna, a hero of the epic, is sent into exile. There he assumes the identity of a eunuch-transvestite and performs rituals during weddings and childbirths that are now performed by hijras.

In another episode, before the Kurukshetra War, Aravan offers his lifeblood to the goddess Kali to ensure victory for the Pandavas, and Kali agrees. On the night before the battle, Aravan expresses a desire to get married before he dies. No woman was willing to marry a man doomed to die in a few hours, so Lord Krishna (as Mohini) marries him. In South India, hijras claim Aravan as their progenitor and call themselves aravanis.

Each year in Tamil Nadu, during April and May, hijras celebrate an eighteen-day religious festival at a temple located in the village of Koovagam in the Ulundurpet taluk in Villupuram district. The temple is devoted to the deity Koothandavar, who is identified with Aravan. During the festival, the hijras reenact the wedding of Lord Krishna and Lord Aravan, followed by Aravan's subsequent sacrifice. They then mourn Aravan's death through ritualistic dances and by breaking their bangles. An annual beauty pageant is also held, as well as various health and HIV/AIDS focused seminars. Hijras from all over the country travel to this festival. The BBC Three documentary India's Ladyboys as well as the National Geographic Channel television series Taboo depict personal experiences of hijras attending this festival.

=== In Islam ===
There is evidence that Indian hijras identifying as Muslim also incorporate aspects of Hinduism. Still, despite this syncretism Gayatri Reddy suggests that hijra do not practise Islam differently from other Muslims and argues that their syncretism does not make them any less Muslim. Reddy also documents an example of how this syncretism manifests: in Hyderabad, India, a group of Muslim converts were circumcised, something seen as the quintessential marker of male Muslim identity.

== In films and literature ==
=== India ===
Hijras have been portrayed on screen in Indian cinema since its inception, historically as comic relief. A notable turning point occurred in 1974 when real hijras appeared during a song-and-dance sequence in Kunwaara Baap ("The Unmarried Father"). The Hindi movie Amar Akbar Anthony (1977) features hijras who accompany one of the heroes, Akbar (Rishi Kapoor), in a song entitled "Tayyab Ali Pyar Ka Dushman" ("Tayyab Ali, the Enemy of Love").

- In Soorma Bhopali (1988), Jagdeep encounters a troupe of hijras on his arrival in Bombay. The leader of this pack is also played by Jagdeep himself.
- One of the main characters in Khushwant Singh's novel Delhi (1990), Bhagmati, is a hijra. She makes a living as a semi-prostitute and is wanted in the diplomatic circles of the city.
- One of the first sympathetic hijra portrayals was in Mani Ratnam's Bombay (1995). 1997's Tamanna starred male actor Paresh Rawal in a central role as "Tiku", a hijra who raises a young orphan. Pooja Bhatt produced and also starred in the movie, with her father, Mahesh Bhatt, co-writing and directing.
- The 1997 Hindi film Darmiyaan: In Between, directed & co-written by Kalpana Lajmi, is based on the subject of hijras, with a fictitious story of an actress bearing a son that turns out to be neuter.
- Kishor Shatabai Kale's novel Hijara Ek Mard (Eunuch, a Man) was adapted for the stage in 1998. The play was titled Andharyatra.
- In the 2000 Tamil film Appu, directed by Vasanth and a remake of the Hindi film Sadak, the antagonist is a brothel-owning hijra played by Prakash Raj. (In Sadak, the brothel-owning character was played by Sadashiv Amrapurkar under the name "Maharani".)
- In Anil Kapoor's Nayak (2001), Johnny Lever, who plays the role of the hero's assistant, gets beaten up by hijras when he is caught calling them "hijra" (he is in the habit of calling almost everyone who bothers him by this pejorative, and no one cares much, except this once ironically, as the addressees are literally what he is calling them.)
- In the 2004 film Bride and Prejudice, directed by Gurinder Chadha, a group of hijras makes an appearance during the "A Marriage Has Come to Town" number, in which they dance and sing the following lyrics: "Who can tell you more about Yin & Yang?/Sharing one spirit between woman and man/Marriage is the path taken by he and she/May your new life be kissed by harmony."
- Deepa Mehta's controversial film Water (2005) features the hijra character "Gulabi" (played by Raghubir Yadav), who has taken to introducing the downtrodden, outcast widows of Varanasi to prostitution.
- Vijay TV's Ippadikku Rose (2008), a Tamil show conducted by postgraduate-educated transgender woman Rose, was a very successful program that discussed various issues faced by youth in Tamil Nadu, where she also gave her own experiences.
- In addition to numerous other themes, the 2008 movie Welcome to Sajjanpur by Shyam Benegal explores the role of hijras in Indian society.
- Jogwa, a 2009 Marathi film, depicts the story of a man forced to be a hijra under certain circumstances. The movie has received several accolades.
- The 2011 film Queens! Destiny of Dance tells the story of an upmarket hijra community that is headed by their queen, Guru Amma, played by actress Seema Biswas.
- The 2011 comedy-horror Kanchana features an unemployed man who is possessed by a transgender woman seeking revenge against her murderers.
- The 2017 novel The Ministry of Utmost Happiness by Arundhati Roy features a storyline involving a Muslim hijra character named Anjum.
- The 2020 comedy-horror Laxmii, based on Kanchana, features the actor Akshay Kumar, a cisgender man who usually plays hypermasculine roles, in the role of a Muslim man who begins crossdressing because he is possessed by the ghost of a transgender woman.
- The 2012 novel Narcopolis by Jeet Thayil features a hijra named Dimple as a main character
- The 2010 novel Chanakya's Chant by Ashwin Sanghi features a storyline involving a hijra character.
- The 2022 film Gangubai Kathiawadi directed by Sanjay Leela Bhansali features a hijra sex worker named Raziabai (played by Vijay Raaz), who rules with an iron fist over the prostitutes of Kamathipura, until her rule is challenged by the titular character in the annual presidential election held among brothel madames.
- Monkey Man (2024) features a commune of hijras who aid the main character.
- Dorothy (2026) follows the story of a young man played by Sananth during the 90's in rural Madurai, who transitions into a woman.

=== Malayalam ===
In the Malayalam movie Ardhanaari, released on 23 November 2012, director Santhosh Sowparnika depicts the life of a transgender person. Manoj K Jayan, Thilakan, Sukumari, and Maniyanpilla Raju perform leading roles.

Njan Marykutty is another Malayalam film about the troubles and challenges of a trans woman in Kerala.

=== Tamil ===
Vaadamalli by novelist Su. Samuthiram is the first Tamil novel about the Aravaani community in Tamil Nadu, published in 1994.

Transgender activist A. Revathi became the first hijra to write about transgender issues and gender politics in Tamil. Her works have been translated into more than eight languages and act as primary resources on gender studies in Asia. Her book is part of a research project for more than 100 universities. She is the author of Unarvum Uruvamum (Feeling and Form), the first of its kind in English from a member of the hijra community. She acted in and directed stage plays on gender and sexuality issues in Tamil and Kannada. The Truth about Me: A Hijra Life Story is part of the syllabus for final year students of The American College in Madurai.

"Naan Saravanan Alla" (2007) and Vidya's I Am Vidya (2008) were the first autobiographies of trans women.

=== Pakistan ===
The 1992 film Immaculate Conception by Jamil Dehlavi is based upon the culture clash between a Western Jewish couple seeking fertility at a Karachi shrine known to be blessed by a Sufi fakir called 'Gulab Shah' and the group of Pakistani eunuchs who guard it.

Murad (English: desire, but the film's English title was Eunuch's Motherhood) was an award-winning biographical telefilm drama made by Evergreen Media Europe for Pakistan's television channel Indus TV that aired in 2003. It featured some of the country's top male television actors—Sohail Asghar, Nabeel, Qazi Wajid, and Kamran Jilani playing the roles of hijras. It was directed by Kamran Qureshi, written by Zafar Mairaj, and produced by Iram Qureshi. It won both Best TeleFilm and Best Director awards at the 2003 Indus Telefilm Festival. The story revolves around Saima, a transgender woman, who adopts a child named Murad. For the first time, influential male actors showed their support for hijra rights during interviews, pointing out that in Pakistani English at that time eunuch was the term to describe a transgender person, and khwaja sara had not yet replaced what is now considered a derogatory term due to decades of heckling and name calling.

In 2004, Kamran Qureshi directed Moorat (English: effigy, released in English under the title Eunuch's Wedding). It is a 33-episode series produced by Humayun Saeed and Abdullah Kadwani with more than a dozen cast members. It was nominated for Best Drama Serial, Abid Ali for Best Actor, and Maria Wasti for Best Actress at the Lux Style Awards 2005. The show was credited with making people understand the pain and abuse that hijras constantly endure when people make fun of the way they look or dress. The story involves a young lady who is engaged to be married. It turns out her husband is transgender. The story unfolds the trans community and their deprived and isolated world. It portrays eloquently how they, too, are not far away from human emotions and feelings, and their world is not much different from the heterosexual community. Even though they are in plain sight, they are taboo subjects and are not taken seriously. This makes them suffer endlessly in silence wrapped in slurs. The 33-episode series therefore touches on transgender abuse, abuse against women, poverty, the immorality of arranged marriages, and child abuse.

Bol (Urdu: بول meaning Speak) is a 2011 Urdu-language Pakistani social drama film. It concerns a patriarch, Hakim, who is a misogynist, a domestic abuser, a bigot, and a zealot who forces religion on his family. They face financial difficulties due to Hakim wanting a son. He rejects his intersex child, Saifi, as he wanted an heir, and she identifies as a girl. Saifi is deeply loved by the rest of her family. As she grows up, men want to take advantage of her, and she does not understand at first. However, her oldest sister intervenes and teaches Saifi about what kind of touching is inappropriate. As Saifi grows older, she is not allowed to leave the house. She finds her sister's dresses compelling and tries them on, revealing her gender identity. A neighbour, played by famous Pakistani singer Atif Aslam, who is in love with one of the sisters, gets Saifi a job at a place where they paint trucks, with the blessing of Saifi's sisters and mother. Saifi dresses like a boy; however, other boys sense her lack of self-esteem and eventually gang-rape her. She is saved when a transgender person, played by Almas Bobby (a transgender actor), finds her and takes her home. Hakim overhears Saifi telling her mother and Zainab what happened. When everybody is asleep, Hakim locks the room and suffocates Saifi for the "shame" he would have to bear if the story got out. It received several positive reviews from critics and went on to win the Best Hindi film award at the IRDS Film awards 2011 by Institute for Research and Documentation in Social Sciences (IRDS).

The 2023 film Joyland (dir. Saim Sadiq), which won the Queer Palm at the 75th Cannes Film Festival, features a trans woman character "Biba" (played by the trans actress Alina Khan ) who works in an erotic dance theatre in Lahore.

=== Outside the Indian subcontinent ===
- In the graphic novel Habibi by Craig Thompson, the protagonist, Zam, is adopted by a group of hijras.
- In the TV comedy Outsourced (2011), a hijra is hired by Charlie as a stripper for Rajiv's "bachelor party", much to Rajiv's utter horror.
- Hijras feature prominently in John Irving's 1994 novel A Son of the Circus.
- Dev Patel's directorial debut, Monkey Man, features a community of hijras who provide aid and refuge to Patel's character.
- In Megha Majumdar's debut novel A Burning, a hijra named Lovely is one of the main POV characters.

=== Documentaries ===
- Middle Sexes (2005 HBO documentary) includes a segment on modern hijra.
- Shabnam Mausi (2005) based on the life of politician Shabnam Mausi.
- Showgirls of Pakistan (2020 documentary) includes a segment on modern hijra.

== See also ==
- Galli, the eunuch priests of the Phrygian goddess Cybele in antiquity
- Kathoey, a distinct transgender group in Thailand
- Lên đồng, transgender priest or medium in Vietnam
- Muxe, an analogous Zapotec concept
- Hijra in Bangladesh
- Gender identities in Thailand
- Emasculation
- Two-spirit
- LGBT rights in Nepal
- LGBTQ rights in Bangladesh
- LGBTQ rights in Pakistan
- LGBTQ rights in India
  - LGBTQ rights in Tamil Nadu
  - LGBTQ rights in Telangana
- Homosexuality in India
