= Hijra in Bangladesh =

Third gender community

Bangladeshi hijras
বাংলাদেশী হিজড়া
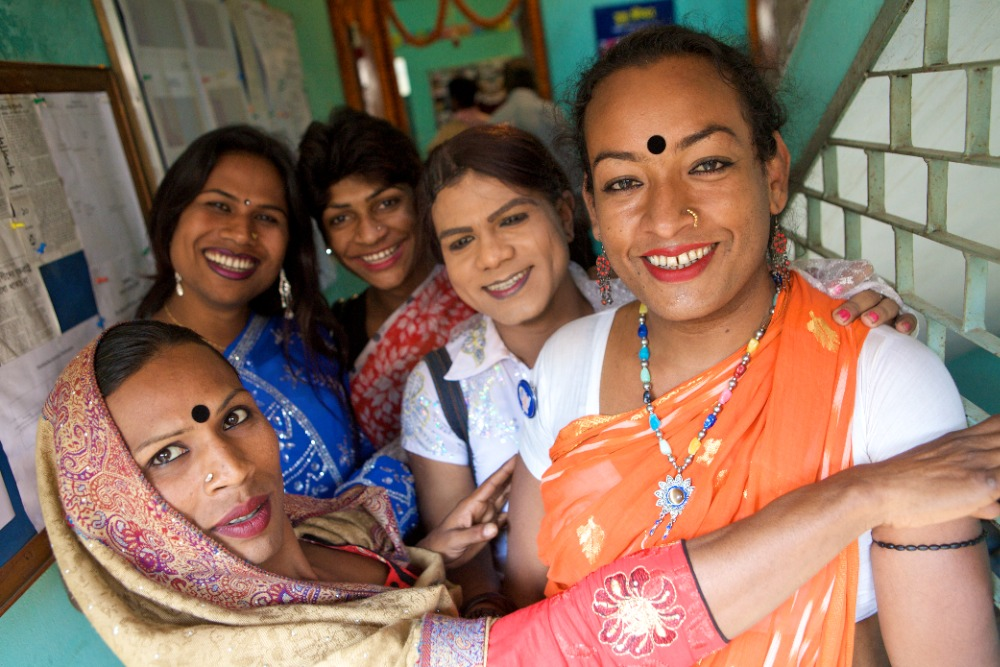
- A group of Hijra in Bangladesh

Total population
- 10,000–50,000 (2020, est.)

Languages
- Languages of Bangladesh

Religion
- Religions of Bangladesh

In Bangladesh, hijra (Bengali: হিজড়া, romanized: hijṛā, pronounced [ˈɦɪdʒɽa]) are individuals who are assigned male at birth but live with a gender identity that is neither fully male or female. According to a survey by the Ministry of Social Welfare (MOSW), there were 10,000 registered hijras in the country in 2013.

Authors stress that the broader hijra community in Bangladesh is heterogeneous and also includes people with intersex traits. Though the government of Bangladesh recognizes hijras as the third gender since 2013–14, there is no clarity about who may qualify as a "hijra". Religiously, hijras are recognized as khunthas in Islamic tradition and devotees of Bahuchara Mata in Hindu tradition. While hijras have legal recognition in Bangladesh, they still face heavy discrimination.

== Identity and classification ==
The meaning of the term hijra varies from place to place. Every region has its own of understanding this term. The research indicates that the term is borrowed from Hindustani with Arabic or Persian roots. Hijra communities today in India, Pakistan and Bangladesh share linked history due to common legal impositions during the colonial period. However, the current definition of the term hijra and situation for the hijra community is different in these three counties.

=== Western perspective ===
Many English language scholars tried to understand or describe hijras as a third gender/third sex or a sub-group of the transgender or LGBTQ communities. However, whereas "transgender" refer to individuals whose gender identity does not align with their sex assigned at birth, recent research explores the hijra community as a distinct, culturally specific institution shaped by factors like religion, ritual roles, kinship structures and colonial/post-colonial laws, rather than simply defining hijras based on individual identity.

=== Religious perspective ===
==== Islam ====
89-90% of the Bangladeshi population are Muslims and they practice the Islamic tradition. In Islamic thought, hijras overlaps with several classical categories — especially khuntha (intersex) and mukhannath (effeminate man), but is not a single fixed sharia category. Modern Muslim scholars and states differ sharply on whether hijras are seen as intersex (part of God's creation) or transgender (changing God's creation), and this shapes religious rulling on their rights and status. Khuntas are basically intersex or hermaphrodite people who are treated as "people with congenital ambiguity" who deserves compassion and gender assignment based on biology. But mukhannath, a biologically male person choosing to live as a woman which is close to the idea of transgender, is not accepted in the Islamic tradition. South Asian discourse often equates hijras with khunthas even though many hijras are not medically intersex. This conflation creates confusion and backlash when hijras are understood instead as transgender.

==== Hinduism ====
In Hinduism, gender non-conforming and androgynous figures provide a cultural backdrop for hijra identities. Concepts like tritiya prakriti (third nature) and deities like Ardhanarisvara, who is the half-male and half-female version of Shiva, acknowledge space for gender fluidity with Hindu thought. In addition, the Bahuchara Mata, or patron goddess, is associated with hijra as emasculation and devotion to her mark "sacred rebirth" and identity. Hijras often describe themselves as devotees of Bahuchara Mata, where rituals like emasculation is framed as a sacrifice to her, giving spiritual power and authenticating hijra identity.

== History ==
Hijras' identity originates in ancient Hinduism and evolved during the Delhi Sultanate (1206–1526) and Mughal Empire (1526–1707).

=== Colonial era ===
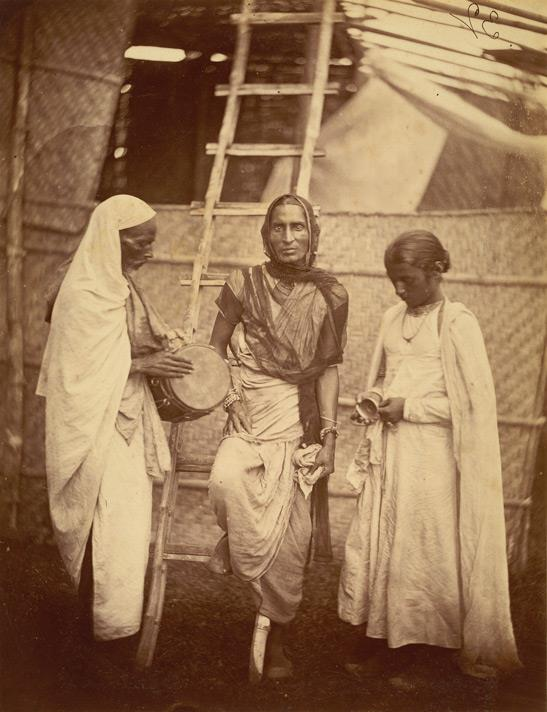
Hijra and companions in Eastern Bengal, modern-day Bangladesh, 1860

During the British Raj, hijras were subjected to various restrictions and intensive state-sponsored discrimination. Beginning in the 1850s, colonial authorities deployed various strategies to end hijra practices, which they saw as "a breach of public decency" and incapable of "moral transformation," as part of their influence on colonial-era sexuality in India. Colonial concern can be traced to 1852 murder of a hijra named Bhoorah in Mainpuri district. During the trials British judges portrayed hijras as beggars, cross-dressers and prostitutes. Historian Jessica Hinchy describes the response as a "moral panic". By 1870, no high-ranking British officials argued against the implementation of special legislation to address the "hijra problem", thus solidifying an anti-hijra campaign all across the Indian subcontinent. Anti-hijra laws were enacted, including a law outlawing castration, a marginal practice of the hijra community, although it was rarely enforced. The community was included in the Criminal Tribes Act (1871), subject to registration, monitoring and stigmatisation.

=== In modern-day Bangladesh ===
The Government of Bangladesh formally recognized hijras as a distinct legal gender category on 11 November 2013, which was codified in 2014 by the cabinet. Along with males and females, hijras were identified as a separate gender on official documents such as passports and national ID cards. However, this gender category does not fully overlap with the broader idea of "transgender" in general. Due to state recognition, hijra rights are now protected by the constitution of Bangladesh, as per articles 27 and 28, all citizens are equal before the law — which should cover hijras' right to education, work and access to services. Despite this, the state does not have vivid policies outlining measures individuals must undergo to legally change their gender on their official documents, nor is there any clarification on what "third gender" or "hijra" means. This ambiguity of definition has affected the daily life of 50,000 to 100,000 estimated hijra individuals in Bangladesh.

Policies such as the "Implementation Manual of Livelihood Development of Hijra 2013" promise education, training and social development, and some welfare programs exist for the community. In December 2014, the MOSW invited hijras to apply for government employment. In April 2019, the hijras officially gained voting rights under their proper gender identity as third genders. In 2020, hijras officially gained the inheritance rights. After a hijra witnessed the murder of a secular blogger by radical Islamists and successfully helped in the arrest of the perpetrators, the government announced plans to recruit and enlist hijras as traffic police in July 2015.

In late-2016, Human Rights Watch reported that the MOSW had issued a memorandum in January 2015 requesting that "necessary steps are taken to identify hijras by conducting thorough medical check-ups". These check-ups resulted in hijras having to strip check and have their genitals confirmed. Photographs of these check-ups were later released to confirmed that hijras are "really men".

== Discrimination ==
Many hijra and transgender Bangladeshis continue to experience discrimination such as restricted education and employment access, violence, denial of health care services, and poverty.

Very few hijra children attend school in Bangladesh, even though education is a constitutional right. Many are forced to drop out early because of bullying, ridicule and being treated as neither a proper boy or proper girl. Similar patterns of low education attainment and high illiteracy are reported in Pakistan and India.

Studies shows that in Bangladesh, it's difficult for hijras to obtain work due to stigma, lack of education, and employers' refusal to hire them. Some reported getting harassed during the interview process. Even when hired, some are fired once their hijra identity is known.

Dakshin Char Kalibari Masjid (also called Dakshin Char Kalibari Masjid for the Third Gender) is the first mosque in Bangladesh that is specifically constructed for the hijra community of the country. The mosque is situated in Mymensingh, Bangladesh and was opened in March 2024. It was built on land donated by the government to provide a place where Muslim members of the hirja community could worship free from discrimination.

== Prominent hijra from Bangladesh ==
- Nazrul Islam Ritu, Bangladesh's first hijra union parishad chairperson

== See also ==
- LGBTQ rights in Bangladesh
- Sexuality in Bangladesh

== Bibliography ==
- Preston, Laurence W. (1 April 1987). "A Right to Exist: Eunuchs and the State in Nineteenth-Century India". Modern Asian Studies. 21 (2): 371–387. doi:10.1017/S0026749X00013858. S2CID 145309265.
- Hinchy, Jessica (2019). Governing Gender and Sexuality in Colonial India: The Hijra, c.1850–1900. Cambridge University Press. ISBN 978-1-108-49255-3.
- Reddy, Gayatri (2010). With Respect to Sex: Negotiating Hijra Identity in South India. University of Chicago Press. ISBN 978-0-226-70754-9.
