= Transgender Persons (Protection of Rights) Act, 2019 =

Act of the Parliament of India

Parliament of India
- Long title: An Act to provide for protection of rights of transgender persons and their welfare and for matters connected therewith and incidental thereto.
- Citation: Act No. 40 of 2019
- Territorial extent: Republic of India
- Passed by: Parliament of India
- Passed: 5 August 2019
- Passed: 26 November 2019
- Assented to: 5 December 2019
- Signed: 5 December 2019
- Commenced: 10 January 2020

Legislative history
- Bill title: The Transgender Persons (Protection of Rights) Bill, 2019
- Bill citation: Bill No. 169 of 2019
- Introduced by: Minister for Social Justice and Empowerment
- Introduced: 19 July 2019
- First reading: 5 August 2019
- Committee report: 43rd Report by Standing Committee on Social Justice and Empowerment, July 2017

Related legislation
- The Transgender Persons (Protection of Rights) Bill, 2018; The Transgender Persons (Protection of Rights) Bill, 2016; The Rights of Transgender Persons Bill, 2014
- Status: In force

The Transgender Persons (Protection of Rights) Act, 2019, is an act of the Parliament of India for protection of rights of transgender people, their welfare, and other related matters. The act was introduced in the Lok Sabha, the lower house of the Indian Parliament, on 19 July 2019 by the Minister of Social Justice and Empowerment, Thawar Chand Gehlot, in light of the lapse of the Transgender Persons (Protection of Rights) Bill, 2018 (Bill No. 210-C of 2016). The 2019 act and the immediately preceding 2018 bill, were both preceded by a 2016 version. They were met with protests and criticism by some transgender people, lawyers, and activists in India. The 2016 bill was sent to a standing committee which submitted its report in July 2017. Following this, the Lok Sabha tabled and passed a newer version of the bill in December 2018. However, it did not incorporate many of the committee's recommendations. Although members of the opposition criticised the 2019 act and assured activists that they would not vote in favour of it, it was passed by the Lok Sabha on 5 August 2019 and by the Rajya Sabha, the upper house of the Parliament, on 26 November 2019. The president assented to it on 5 December 2019, upon which the act was published in the Gazette of India. It has been in effect since 10 January 2020 following a notification of the same in the Gazette on the same day.

Following protests by the queer community against the 2016 and 2018 bills, the 2019 act has done away with some of the severely criticised provisions of the 2018 bill, such as the criminalisation of begging and the establishment of a district screening committee to process applications for issuance of transgender person certificates. However, it fails to incorporate yet other principles in line with the Supreme Court judgment in National Legal Services Authority v. Union of India (NALSA v. UOI) in 2014, such as the right of transgender people to declare their self-perceived gender identity without undergoing sex reassignment surgery, and reservations in jobs and educational institutions. The act has also been criticised for imposing less punishment for crimes against transgender people compared with punishment for crimes against cisgender people. On 27 January 2020, the Supreme Court issued a notice to the central government in a petition challenging the constitutionality of the act.

In January 2014, while judicial pronouncement in the NALSA petition was pending, the Ministry of Social Justice and Empowerment published an Expert Committee Report on issues relating to transgender people, after consultations with transgender people. Tiruchi Siva, of the Dravida Munnetra Kazhagam party, had introduced the Rights of Transgender Persons Bill in 2014, in the Rajya Sabha, which was passed by the house in 2015. It stayed pending in the Lok Sabha, during which the 2016 bill was tabled, and lapsed following the dissolution of the house prior to the 2019 general elections. Parties such as the Indian National Congress and Communist Party of India (Marxist) had promised in their respective electoral manifestoes for the 2019 elections to, respectively, withdraw the 2018 bill — while introducing a new one consulting members of the queer community — and pass one based on the 2014 bill.

== History and background ==
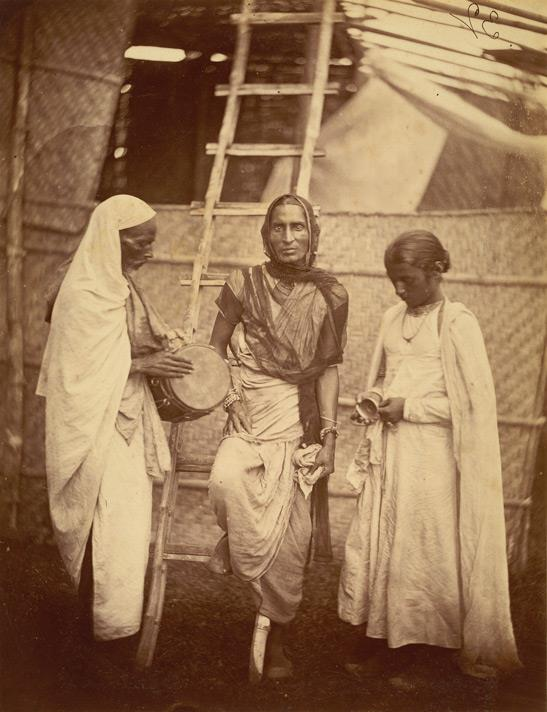
Hijras in eastern Bengal, circa 1860

On 15 April 2014, the Supreme Court of India delivered its judgment in National Legal Services Authority v. Union of India (NALSA v. UOI), in which it recognised the rights of transgender people in India and laid down a series of measures for securing transgender people's rights by mandating the prohibition of discrimination, recommending the creation of welfare policies, and reservations for transgender people in educational institutions and jobs. The judgment upheld the right of a transgender person to self-perceived gender identity, guaranteed by the Constitution of India, in the absence of sex reassignment surgery. The 2014 judicial mandate was affirmed by the judgments of the Supreme Court in Justice K. S. Puttaswamy (Retd.) and anr. v. Union of India and ors. (2017) and Navtej Singh Johar v. Union of India (2018). The judgment in NALSA v. UOI also noted the presence of transgender people in India throughout its history, and made reference to the hijra, kinnar, and jogta communities, spread across the country and elsewhere in the Indian subcontinent.

While the decision in the NALSA petition was still pending, an Expert Committee Report on issues relating to transgender people was published in January 2014, after consultations by the Ministry of Social Justice and Empowerment with transgender people in August 2013. In this context, Tiruchi Siva of the Dravida Munnetra Kazhagam party introduced a private member's bill in the Rajya Sabha, namely the Rights of Transgender Persons Bill, 2014 (Bill No. 49 of 2014).

The government had initially asked Siva to withdraw the bill due to there being "some anomalies" in the text; however, the opposition had a majority in the house and the bill was unanimously passed by the Rajya Sabha on 24 April 2015. The bill was welcomed by queer rights activists in India. However, some transgender people noted their absence from the entire process and called for their recommendations to be sought. The Rights of Transgender Persons Bill, 2014 was the first private member's bill to be passed by the Rajya Sabha in thirty-six years and by the Parliament as a whole in forty-five years. Between 1947 and 2015, only sixteen private member's bills were passed.

The 2014 bill underwent significant changes when the government drafted its own version of the bill, omitting provisions in the 2014 bill. After recommendations were received from transgender people, the bill was sent to the Ministry of Law and Justice. It came to be known as the Rights of Transgender Persons Bill, 2015. Later, on 26 February 2016, the bill was introduced in the Lok Sabha for debate by Baijayant Panda of the Biju Janata Dal party. He argued that the bill would help extend constitutional rights and end discrimination against transgender people, allowing them to live a life of dignity. The bill was discussed in the Lok Sabha on 29 April 2016. Siva stated that he will not be withdrawing the 2014 bill.

While the 2014 bill passed by the Rajya Sabha was still pending, the government tabled the Transgender Persons (Protection of Rights) Bill, 2016 (Bill No. 210 of 2016), on 2 August 2016, following the reconstitution of the Lok Sabha after the 2014 general elections. The 2016 bill had various provisions which were reportedly regressive and inferior to those in the 2014 bill. The bill was met with criticism and protests from Indian transgender people and was referred to the standing committee, which submitted its report in July 2018. The Lok Sabha tabled and passed a newer version of the bill with twenty-seven amendments on 17 December 2018. The bill was once again met with severe criticism and protests across India, as it overlooked the recommendations made by the standing committee and the suggestions that had been offered by transgender people. The 2018 bill lapsed due to the dissolution of the Lok Sabha. With the house's dissolution, the Rights of Transgender Persons Bill, 2014 that was still pending before the Lok Sabha also lapsed.

Following the reconstitution of the Lok Sabha after the 2019 general elections, the bill was reintroduced on 19 July 2019 by the Minister of Social Justice and Empowerment, Thawar Chand Gehlot. Before this the bill had been approved by the union cabinet on 10 July 2019. The bill was passed by a voice vote in the Lok Sabha on 5 August 2019, amidst commotion in the house following the revocation of the state of Jammu and Kashmir's special status by the Parliament on the same day. The bill was introduced in the Rajya Sabha by Thawarchand Gehlot on 20 November 2019, upon which it was passed without any amendments on 26 November 2019 following a motion to refer it to a select committee that failed by 77 noes against 55 ayes. The bill received presidential assent on 5 December 2019, following which the Ministry of Law and Justice published it in the Gazette of India as Act No. 40 of 2019. The act came has been in effect since 10 January 2020 after a notification of the same in the Gazette by the Ministry of Social Justice and Empowerment.

=== Amendments ===
In 2026, the Modi government passed the Transgender Persons (Protection of Rights) Amendment Bill, 2026, which removes a transgender person's right to determine their own gender and proposes a medical board examination to determine one's gender. The bill was opposed by opposition MPs.

== Statutory provisions ==
The 2018 bill criminalised begging, which many transgender people in India, such as the hijras and jogtas, engage in as a ritual-custom, while some rely on it for livelihood. It had also mandated applications be made to the district magistrate for screening through a district screening committee before the issuance of transgender person certificates. The screening committee was to be composed of five people including a chief medical officer, district social welfare officer, psychologist/psychiatrist, and a representative of transgender people. The 2018 bill had also not provided for mandatory reservations for transgender people and mandated lower punishment for crimes against transgender people, as compared to punishment for crimes against cisgender people under the Indian Penal Code. It also ensured a family-life for transgender children, by prohibiting their separation from their family, without taking into account harassment and discrimination they may face within their family as a result of which they may voluntarily choose to be separated and to reside instead with other transgender people. A transgender child, as per the provisions, can be separated from their family only by a court order. Similar to the 2019 statute, the 2018 bill also required one to undergo sex reassignment surgery to be legally recognised as a man or a woman in official documents. The 2019 act does away with only a few of the criticised provisions of the 2018 bill, such as the district screening committee and the criminalisation of begging.

The statutory provisions of the 2019 act prohibit discrimination against transgender people. Similar to the 2018 bill, the 2019 act includes intersex people, hijras, jogtas, and kinnars within its definition of transgender people, as well as trans-men, trans-women, and genderqueers, though these latter terms are undefined. Both the 2019 act as well as the 2018 bill describe a transgender person as someone whose gender does not match with the gender assigned to them at birth.

Under the provisions of the 2019 act, a transgender person can apply to the district magistrate for a transgender person certificate which will give them the right to change the name on their birth certificate and have all documents updated accordingly. However, similar to the 2018 bill provisions, a transgender person can be identified as male or female only after applying for a revised certificate to the district magistrate, post sex reassignment surgery.

The 2019 act also protects transgender children and provides for states and institutions to come up with adequate policies to ensure the welfare of transgender people. Similar to the provisions of the 2018 bill, under the provisions of the 2019 act a transgender child can be separated from their family by a court order. However, unlike the Rights of Transgender Persons Bill, 2014 neither the 2018 bill nor the 2019 act provide for reservations for transgender people in educational institutions and jobs. The 2014 bill had provided for two per-cent reservations in educational institutions and public employment. Similar to the 2018 bill, the 2019 act provides for punishment for crimes against transgender people, which stands as an imprisonment for a term not less than six months but which may extend to two years and a fine. The 2019 act, as well as the 2018 bill, also provide for the creation of a National Council for Transgender Persons.

On 18 April 2020, the government published Draft Transgender Persons (Protection of Rights) Rules, 2020 in exercise of its powers under the 2019 statute, seeking comments and suggestions on the same from the public.

== Criticism and reactions ==
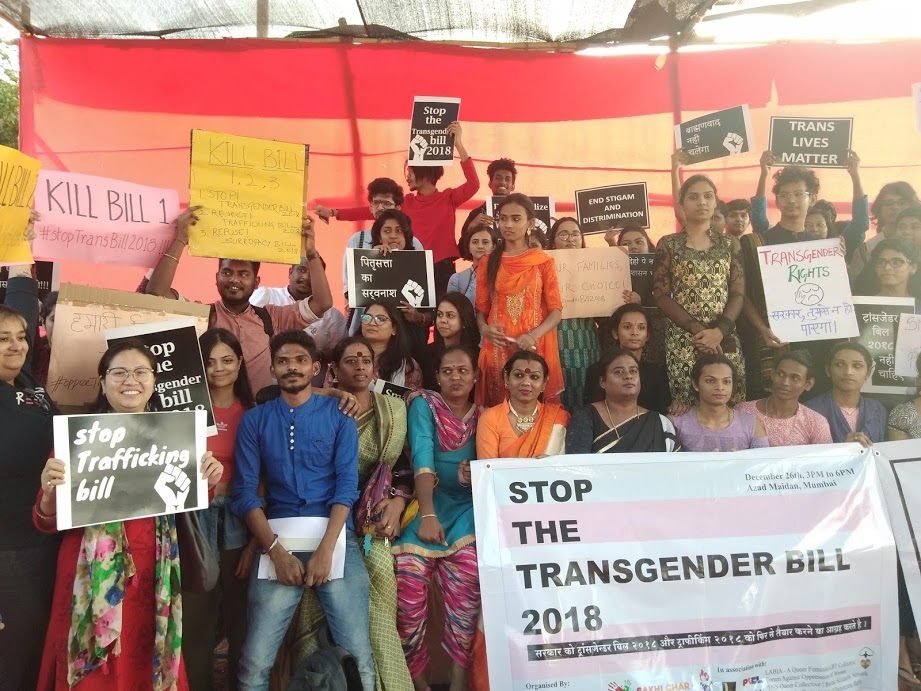
Protests against the 2018 bill in Mumbai, in December 2018

The 2018 bill passed by the Lok Sabha was widely criticised by transgender people, activists, students, and lawyers. Transgender people protested in various cities in India calling the provisions regressive and in violation of the Supreme Court's 2014 judgment in NALSA v. UOI. The criminalisation of begging under the 2018 bill was to affect transgender people in India, such as hijras and jogtas, who engage in begging as a ritual-custom while some rely on it for livelihood. It was alleged by critics that the provision establishing the district screening committees left gaps for incompetence and prejudice. Hindustan Times reported that even if the provision of a district screening committee existed to prevent imposters from seeking benefits of government welfare schemes, such an arrangement cannot be made at the expense of transgender people's right to self-determination. The definition of transgender people under the 2018 bill, retained by the 2019 act, was reported by Frontline to be different than how transgender identity is understood internationally.

The 2018 bill and 2019 act have been met with protests by transgender people. The day of their passing has been referred to some transgender people as a "black day" and as "gender justice murder day". Others described them as "draconian and discriminatory". After the 2018 bill was passed by the Lok Sabha in December, members of the opposition in the Rajya Sabha had stated they will not let the bill pass in its present form in the Rajya Sabha. Protestors alleged the 2018 bill institutionalises violence and decried what they saw as neglect of the recommendations made by the standing committee and by transgender people. Transgender people called the requirement of applications to be made to the district magistrate for issuance of transgender certificates, the lesser punishment for crimes against transgender people, and the absence of provisions on mandatory reservations for transgender people regressive to the judicial mandate of the Supreme Court in 2014 in NALSA v. UOI, thereby violating their right to equality and other fundamental rights.

In the run-up to the 2019 general elections to the Lok Sabha, the Indian National Congress had promised in its electoral manifesto to withdraw the 2018 bill and introduce a new one, in consultation with members of the queer community. The Communist Party of India (Marxist) supported the passing of the 2014 bill in its electoral manifesto. In April 2019, transgender rights activist Laxmi Narayan Tripathi, met the then Bharatiya Janata Party National General Secretary, Ram Madhav, asking the party to introduce a revised bill if it were to return to power. Madhav assured her that he would address the concerns of the transgender community. Soon after news reported that the 2019 bill was approved by the union cabinet, transgender rights activists held a press conference in Delhi to address the issue. On 24 November 2019, two days before the bill was passed by the parliament, protests were staged by the queer community in New Delhi and Bengaluru as part of the Delhi queer pride parade and the Bengaluru Namma Pride March, respectively. The legislation also drew criticism from the All India Mahila Congress and opposition from parliamentarians including Jaya Bachchan and Sasmit Patra, while Derek O'Brien and Tiruchi Siva also expressed their concerns before the house. After the legislation was passed by the parliament, transgender people and activists protested against the legislation, organised meetings to address the situation, and urged the president not to sign and give his assent to the bill. There were also protests by the queer community against the act as part of the Mumbai pride parade in February 2020.

The legislation has been criticised by Human Rights Watch and the International Commission of Jurists. On 27 January 2020, the Supreme Court issued a notice requiring the central government to respond in a petition challenging the constitutionality of the 2019 legislation, filed by judge and transgender rights activist Swati Bidhan Baruah. On 12 June 2020, the Supreme Court issued notice to the government in another petition filed challenging the constitutionality of the statute, tagging it with the petition filed by Baruah.

The Act has been criticised for overlooking the demand of transgender community for reservations in the matter of appointment which was recommended in NALSA judgment (2014) by The Supreme Court of India. The Act also provides for punishment of up to two years for sexual abuse of transgender persons which is significantly less than the permission for sexual assault of women.

Post-enactment analyses of the 2019 Act have highlighted ongoing systemic gaps in its execution. Academic evaluations, drawing on RTI investigations and official records, argue that the Act has inadvertently led to "implementational disenfranchisement" and "Corrigible Inequities." This occurs through severe bureaucratic gatekeeping, particularly in the issuance of identity certificates, which effectively prevents transgender individuals from accessing mandated social security and vocational opportunities.

== See also ==
- LGBT rights in India
- Human rights in India
