= Special Marriage (Amendment) Bill, 2022 =

The Special Marriage (Amendment) Bill, 2022 is a Bill of the Parliament of India which seeks to legalise same-sex marriage in India by amending the Special Marriage Act, 1954. It was filed in the Lok Sabha on 2 April 2022 by MP Supriya Sule as a Private member's bill. The proposal would amend various sections of the Act to provide same-sex couples with the same legal rights as opposite-sex couples. The bill would fix the marriageable age at 21 for male couples and at 18 for lesbian couples.

== See also ==
- LGBT rights in India
- Transgender Persons (Protection of Rights) Act, 2019
