= Queens! Destiny of Dance =

- Directed by: David Atkins
- Written by: M.P.Anamika (dialogues)
- Screenplay by: David Atkins
- Story by: David Atkins
- Produced by: Vipul V.Bangera
- Starring: Seema Biswas; Vineeth; Laxmi Narayan Tripathi; Raj Zutshi; Archanna Guptaa
- Cinematography: Srinivas Ramaiah
- Edited by: Chaitanya V.Tanna; Ashish Amrute
- Music by: Anurag Ware; Anurag Ware-Girish Talpade (bgm)
- Production companies: Miraj Entertainment Limited; View Motion Picture Pvt.Ltd.
- Release date: 29 April 2011
- Country: India
- Language: Hindi

Queens! Destiny of Dance is a 2011 Indian drama film directed by David Atkins, starring Seema Biswas, Laxmi Narayan Tripathi, Raj Zutshi, Archanna Guptaa Vineeth. Even though the film won several international awards, it was a box office failure.

== Summary ==
Queens! Destiny of Dance is the story of an upmarket hijra community that is headed by their queen, Guru Amma.

== Cast ==
- Seema Biswas - Guru Amma
- Vineeth - Mukta
- Laxmi Narayan Tripathi - Lajo
- Raj Zutshi - Hakim
- Archanna Guptaa - Nandini

== Production ==
Transgender activist Laxmi Narayan Tripathi met the director David Atkins in 2001 and asked him to make a film on hijras. After a research, the director confirmed the project and contacted Tripathi to support the project, titled as Queens! Destiny Of Dance, and she happily agreed. National award winner Seema Biswas and South Indian actor Vineeth were signed to play key roles along with Laxmi Narayan Tripathi as well as Archanna Guptaa, with veteran actor Raj Zutshi was also signed for a small role.
