= Rights of Transgender Persons Bill, 2014 =

Proposed Act of the Parliament of India

Parliament of India
- Long title: A bill to provide for the formulation and implementation of a comprehensive national policy for ensuring overall development of the transgender persons and for their welfare to be undertaken by the State and for matters connected therewith and incidental thereto.
- Enacted by: Parliament of India
- Bill citation: No. 49 of 2014
- Status: Not passed

The Rights of Transgender Persons Bill, 2014 is a proposed Act of the Parliament of India which seeks to end the discrimination faced by transgender people in India. The Bill was passed by the upper house Rajya Sabha on 24 April 2015. It was introduced in the lower house Lok Sabha on 26 February 2016.

== History ==
The Bill was introduced in the Rajya Sabha by Dravida Munnetra Kazhagam (DMK) leader Tiruchi Siva as a private member's bill. Some Bharatiya Janata Party (BJP) leaders initially tried to convince Siva to withdraw the bill citing anomalies and impractical clauses. Minister of Social Justice and Empowerment Thawar Chand Gehlot said that some clauses of the bill were impractical and too complicated. He promised future policies to benefit transgender people, while requesting the Bill to be withdrawn. Mukhtar Abbas Naqvi, Minister of State for Parliamentary Affairs, and P. J. Kurien of Indian National Congress (INC) also made similar requests.

However, Siva refused to withdraw the bill. He argued that 29 nations had laws regarding transgender rights. He pointed out that there were allegedly 450,000 transgender people in India, while the actual number may be around 20,00,000. They had the right to vote, but faced discrimination in their day-to-day life. The ruling-party members responded to the initial voice vote with a negative. This forced Siva to call for a division of the house. Finance Minister Arun Jaitley discouraged it. Jaitley said that Siva withdraw the bill and wait for the policies promised by Gehlot or the house should support the bill. The bill was unanimously passed on 24 April 2015 in the Rajya Sabha, where the Opposition had the majority but also received support from the treasury bench. The move was welcomed by LGBT-rights activist Simran Shaikh and Gopi Shankar Madurai. The Bill is considered historic as for being the first private member's bill to be passed by any house in 36 years and by Rajya Sabha in 45 years. Usually, the bills are withdrawn after a debate and the government's response. Until then, only 14 private member's bills had been passed since 1947.

On 26 February 2016, the bill was introduced in the Lok Sabha for debate by Biju Janata Dal (BJD) leader Baijayant Panda. Panda argued that the bill would help extend constitutional rights and end the discrimination against transgender people, allowing them to live a life of dignity. BJP leader Jagdambika Pal also supported ending the discrimination against transgender people.

== Summary ==
The Clauses 21 and 22 of Chapter V aim to reserve 2% of seats in primary, secondary and higher education institutions funded by the government, and in government jobs. The Clause 24 for Chapter V mandates formation of special employment exchanges for transgender people. The Chapter VII details the formation of national and state-levels commission for transgender people. The Chapter VIII details the formation of special transgender rights courts. The Clause 11 of Chapter II specifies the right of a transgender child to a home and imposes conditions for foster care. The Chapter IX details the offenses and penalties. The maximum penalty for hate speech against transgender people in 1 year imprisonment with fine.

== See also ==
- LGBT rights in India
- Transgender Persons (Protection of Rights) Act, 2019
