= K. S. Panicker Radhakrishnan =

Indian judge (born 1949)

K. S. Radhakrishna Panicker
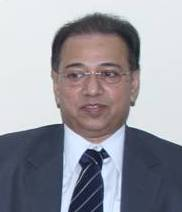

Judge of the Supreme Court of India
- In office 17 November 2009 – 14 May 2014

Personal details
- Born: 15 May 1949 (age 77)
- Education: Cochin University of Science and Technology

Kalavamkodath Sivasankara Radhakrishna Panicker (born 15 May 1949) is a former judge of the Supreme Court of India. Prior to that, he served as the Chief Justice of Jammu and Kashmir High Court and Chief Justice of Gujarat High Court.

== Early life and education ==
Radhakrishnan obtained master's degree in law in Administrative Law from the Cochin University of Science and Technology. He has also passed Post Graduate Diploma in Constitutional Law from ICPS, New Delhi.

== Career ==
He was enrolled as Advocate on 8 December 1973 and practised in the High Court of Kerala and Subordinate Civil Courts at Ernakulam .Radhakrishnan was Standing Counsel for Cochin University of Science and Technology, State Bank of India, State Bank of Travancore, Kerala State Cooperative Rubber Marketing Federation and State Trading Corporation of India.

== Notable cases ==
He was part of a two-judge bench of the Supreme Court of India that dealt with "SEBI vs Sahara" case. The bench held that Sahara illegally collected Rs 24,000 crore and ordered it to return all the money to the investors. However, even after more than one and half years Sahara did not comply with the order. In February 2014, the bench of Justice Radhakrishnan and Justice JS Khehar ordered arrest of Sahara's top management including its topmost boss Subrata Roy.

In a judgement favouring property development firm DLF in its legal battle against the homeowners association of Silver Oaks society, Gurgaon, Justice Radhakrishnan took a narrow view of common areas, to the detriment of the apartment owners. Whereas apartment owners contended that the facilities inside their colony belonged to the homeowners association, Justice Radhakrishnan, along with Justice A.K. Sikri of the Supreme Court of India, held that property development companies could legitimately contend that these facilities belong to them instead. In so doing, they overturned a judgement of the Punjab and Haryana High Court, which had taken a liberal view of "common areas", and given relief to the homeowners against the property developer.

He was part of a two-judge bench of the Supreme Court of India that decided National Legal Services Authority v. Union of India. Decided in April 2014, one month before stepping down as a Supreme Court judge, this 113-page decision declared transgender persons to be a 'third gender', affirmed that the fundamental rights granted under the Constitution of India apply to transgender persons, and gave them the right to self-identify their gender as male, female or third gender.

== Award ==
- He received PETA man of the year Award for banning Jallikattu, a bull-taming tradition observed in Tamil Nadu.

== Faculty ==
- Member of Faculty of Law, Cochin University of Science and Technology
- Fellow of ICPS, New Delhi
