= Sexuality in Bangladesh =

Sexuality in Bangladesh is primarily influenced by religion and culture. The culture in Bangladesh is predominantly conservative and patriarchal. Several topics, including sex education, romantic relationships, and sexual behavior are considered taboo.

== Marriage ==
Arranged marriage is a prevalent cultural practice in Bangladesh. Families of the brides seek to arrange marriages with grooms that are employed, financially stable, and of reproductive age - with the concept being the basis of the Bangladeshi family system. Bangladesh being largely socially conservative, there is a strong sociocultural prohibition on love marriage, which is a majority is critical of. However, in recent times, romantic relationships and hence a potential openness to love marriage can be seen, if to a lesser extent, amongst the youth and/or the Urban population.

Any discussion around sex and sexuality is considered a taboo. Bangladesh is a family-oriented Muslim-majority country with a strong socioeconomic class structure. Cultural discussion around romance is considered to be sinful, a social crime, or a form of perverted behavior. However, there is a pocket of tolerance and acceptance for romance in Bangladesh amongst certain social classes.

== Sex education ==
Comprehensive sex education is critical for young people in Bangladesh as it equips them with the knowledge and skills they need to make informed decisions about their sexual health. Bangladesh has conservative sex education system in school-syllabus, and the majority of the school-teachers teach the chapter in a conservative way. Very often, the teachers skip the chapter in book which is about sex education. Friendship with the opposite gender is discouraged in the society. There are gender segregation in so many schools where making inter-gender friendship is very hard. Despite all these restrictions, moderate and modest friendships have always been accepted and appreciated by some urban societies.

== Pornography ==
Watching, possessing, or producing of any kind of pornography is illegal in Bangladesh. A law against it was passed by the parliament in 2012; 244 pornographic sites and sites linked to adult content were blocked as per the rule.

== Homosexuality ==
Homosexual sexual behavior is outlawed in Bangladesh, as Section 377 of the Penal Code forbids anal or oral sex, regardless of the gender and sexual orientation of the participants. Thus, even consensual heterosexual acts such as fellatio and anal penetration may be punishable under this law. In 2009 and 2013, the Parliament of Bangladesh refused to overturn Section 377. In 2014, the first LGBTQ magazine was launched in Bangladesh, called Roopbaan. The same year, Bangladesh held its first Trans Pride parade.

== Prostitution ==
Prostitution is legal since 2000, though the practice is rejected by society. Both female and male prostitution are found in brothels. There are many male prostitutes in Bangladesh who are selling their bodies to women, these males are from different levels of society. Apart from female customers these male prostitutes also have male customers. There are 14 registered brothels in this country which run legally under the supervision of local police authorities.

== Bibliography ==
- Lewis, David (2011). Bangladesh: Politics, Economy and Civil Society. Cambridge University Press.
