= Gayatri Reddy =

Indian anthropologist

- Born: June 23, 1982 (age 44)
- Occupations: Anthropologist, professor
- Known for: Contributions to queer and gender studies

Academic background
- Education: Delhi University (B.A.); Columbia University (M.A.); Emory University (Ph.D., MPH)

Academic work
- Discipline: Anthropology
- Institutions: University of Illinois at Chicago, Kinsey Institute

Gayatri Reddy (born 23 June 1982) is an Indian anthropologist who has also made contributions to queer and gender studies.

Reddy received her PhD in Anthropology in 2000 from Emory University after M.A in Anthropology from Columbia University and B.A. in Psychology from Delhi University. She is currently an associate professor in Anthropology and Gender and Women's Studies at the University of Illinois at Chicago. Reddy has carried out fieldwork on a community of Hyderabad, Andhra Pradesh in India. Her current research is on male queer identity among South Asian immigrants to the US.

Reddy is the Association for Feminist Anthropology Program Chair for 2007, and a member of the steering committee for the University Consortium for Sexuality Research and Training at the Kinsey Institute.
