= Tiruchi Siva =

Indian politician

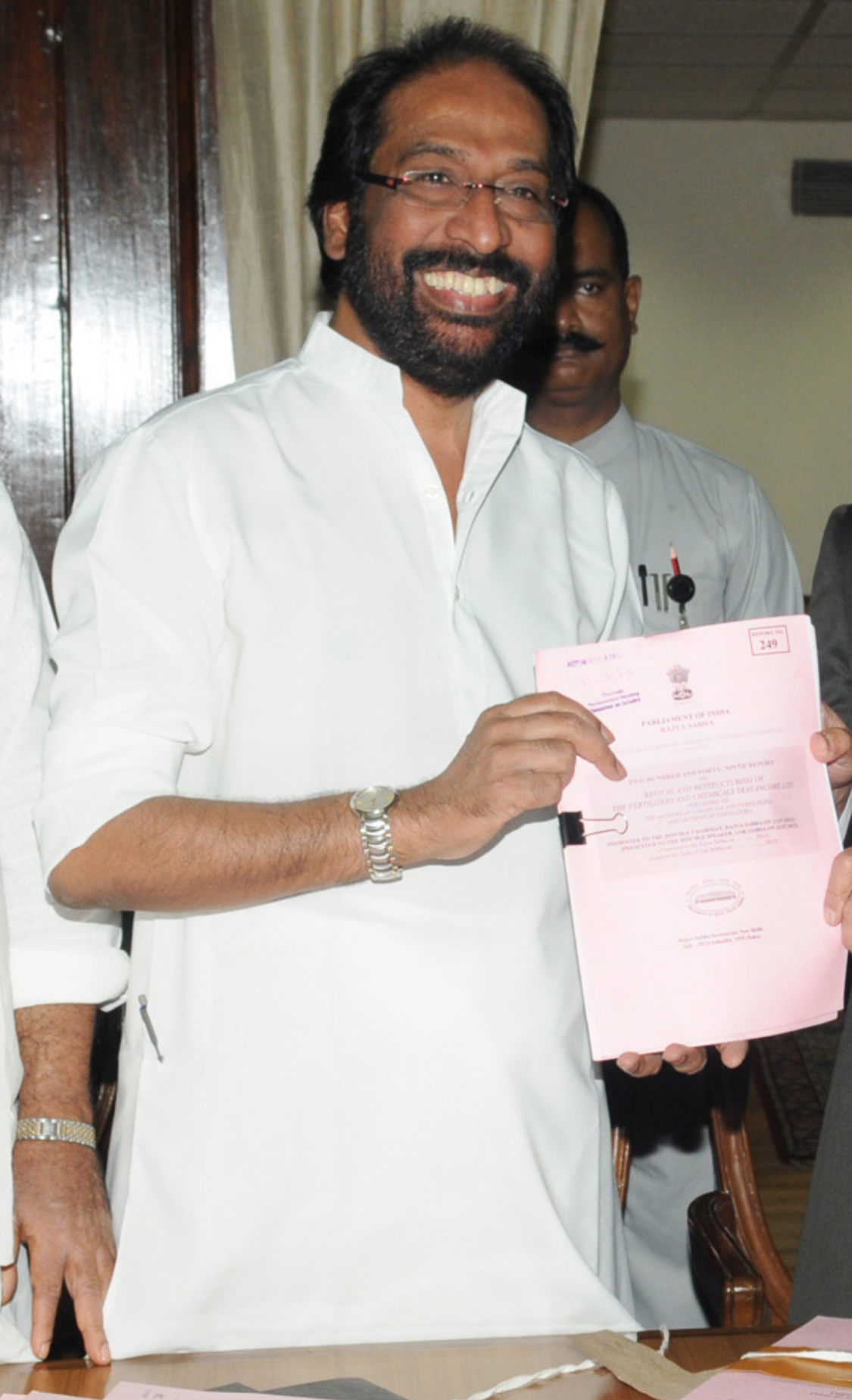

Leader of Dravida Munnetra Kazhagam in Rajya Sabha
- Incumbent
- Assumed office 3 April 2014
- Constituency: Tamil Nadu

Member of Parliament, Rajya Sabha
- Incumbent
- Assumed office 3 April 2014
- Preceded by: S. Amir Ali Jinnah
- Constituency: Tamil Nadu
- In office 25 July 2007 – 24 July 2013
- Constituency: Tamil Nadu
- In office 14 January 2000 – 2 April 2002
- Constituency: Tamil Nadu

Member of Parliament, Lok Sabha for Pudukkottai
- In office 15 May 1996 – 4 December 1997
- Preceded by: N. Sundararaj
- Succeeded by: Raja Paramasivam

Member of Panel of Vice Chairpersons (Rajya Sabha)

Personal details
- Born: Siva; 6 June 1954 (age 72) Trichy, Tamil Nadu, India
- Party: Dravida Munnetra Kazhagam
- Spouse: S. Devikarani
- Children: Son - Suriyaa Siva; Daughters - Dr. Padma Priya and Gayatri Siva
- Education: University of Madras; Bharathidasan University
- Occupation: Agriculturist and social worker

Tiruchi N. Siva is a member of the Parliament of India representing Tamil Nadu in the Rajya Sabha, the upper house of parliament. He is from the Dravida Munnetra Kazhagam party, and was elected in 1996, 2002, 2007, 2014 and 2020. He is a speaker and a writer.

== Career ==
As a student, he was imprisoned for one year under the Maintenance of Internal Security Act (MISA) during the Emergency of 1976. In 1978 he was an organizer for the DMK District Student’s Wing. Between 1982 and 1992 he served as the Deputy Secretary of the DMK Youth Wing and later serving as the Secretary of the same between 1992 and 2007. He was the Propaganda Secretary and the Deputy General Secretary of the DMK.

He has written articles in the Party’s official organ Murasoli and other magazines.

== In Parliament ==
=== Historic Private Member Bill to Protect Rights of Transgenders ===
On 24 April 2015, Siva introduced a private member's bill, the Rights of Transgender Persons Bill, 2014, and after discussion the Bill was put on a voice vote and was unanimously passed by the Rajya Sabha. This was the first Private member's bill to be passed by any house in 36 years and by the Upper House in 45 Years. The Bill was passed with the intent to help transgender people get benefits, making it that they are not denied enrollment in schools or denied jobs in the government as well as protected from sexual harassment.

=== Fourth Term in Parliament (2014-2020) ===
On Women's Day 8 March 2018, Siva asked the Government to exempt sanitary napkins from GST net.

Raising a Special Mention in Rajya Sabha on NEET Exams, he raised the concern that the two bills passed unanimously by the Tamil Nadu Legislative Assembly which was sent for Presidential Assent was still pending with the Ministry of Home and Health which is a bad situation for the Federal Set Up of the Country.

Participating in the Debate on Passage of Citizenship Amendment Bill in Rajya Sabha on 11 Dec 2019, he strongly opposed the bill, raising several questions including why Minorities from Sri Lanka were excluded and why the Bill targets only Muslims which has created a sense of apprehension amongst the Muslims in India.

On 10 December 2019, he was awarded the Best Parliamentarian of the Year (Rajya Sabha) at the Lokmat Parliamentary Awards - 2019.Vice President M Venkaiah Naidu presented the award for his exemplary contribution to Rajya Sabha.

=== Fifth Term in Parliament ===
On 2 March 2020, he was re-nominated to Rajya Sabha by the DMK President M. K. Stalin. On 18 March 2020, Mr.Siva became the first DMK MP to serve a fourth term in Rajya Sabha.

=== Other Prominent Posts ===
He has also served as a member of the Court of the Jawaharlal Nehru University from September 2009 to May 2012 and was the Vice-President of the Parliamentary Forum on Artisans and Craftspeople from April 2013 to July 2013.

=== Membership in Various Committees in his Five Terms ===
Date / Period	Position / Role
April 2026	Re-elected to Rajya Sabha (fifth term); Member, General Purposes Committee (Nov. 2025 – April 2026); President, India–Bahrain Parliamentary Friendship Group (Feb. 2026 – April 2026)
July 2022	Nominated to Panel of Vice-Chairpersons, Rajya Sabha (July 2022; renominated Dec. 2022 & Nov. 2025); Chairman, Committee on Industry (Sept. 2022 – June 2024; Sept. 2024 – April 2026); Member, Committee on Petitions (Nov. 2022 – Oct. 2024)
April 2020	Elected to Rajya Sabha (fourth term); Chairman, Committee on Information and Communication Technology Management (Nov. 2019 – Jan. 2023); Member, Committee on Ethics (Oct. 2019 – April 2020; July 2020 – April 2026); Member, Committee on Subordinate Legislation (Oct. 2019 – April 2020; July 2020 – Nov. 2022; Oct. 2024 – April 2026); Member, Committee on Transport, Tourism and Culture (Sept. 2019 – April 2020; July 2020 – Sept. 2022); Member, Ad-hoc Committee on pornography on social media (Dec. 2019 – Feb. 2020)
Oct. 2024	Member, Consultative Committee for Ministry of Road Transport and Highways (Oct. 2024 – April 2026); Member, Committee on Public Accounts (Aug. 2024 – April 2026)
May 2023	Member, Committee on Public Accounts (May 2023 – April 2024)
Dec. 2021	Member, Joint Committee on Biological Diversity (Amendment) Bill, 2021 (Dec. 2021 – Aug. 2022)
April 2014	Elected to Rajya Sabha (third term); Member, Committee on Human Resource Development (Sept. 2014 – Sept. 2016); Member, Select Committee on Payment and Settlement Systems Bill, 2014 (Dec. 2014 – Feb. 2015); Member, Select Committee on Coal Mines Bill, 2015 (March 2015); Member, Select Committee on Prevention of Corruption Bill, 2013 (Dec. 2015 – Aug. 2016); Member, Select Committee on Enemy Property Bill, 2016 (March – May 2016); Member, Committee on Rules (Oct. 2016 – May 2019); Member, Committee on Personnel, Public Grievances, Law and Justice (Sept. 2016 – Feb. 2018)
July 2018	Member, Select Committee on Ancient Monuments Bill, 2018 (July 2018 – Feb. 2019)
Feb. 2018	Member, Committee on Industry (Feb. 2018 – May 2019)
Dec. 2018	Member, Committee on Provision of Computers to Members of Rajya Sabha (Dec. 2018 – Oct. 2019)
Nov. 2012	Nominated to Panel of Vice-Chairmen, Rajya Sabha; Member, Select Committee on Lokpal and Lokayuktas Bill, 2011 (June – Nov. 2012)
March 2011	Member, JPC on telecom licences and spectrum (March 2011 – July 2013)
Aug. 2010	Chairman, Committee on Industry (Aug. 2010 – July 2013); Member, Committee on Ethics (Sept. 2010 – July 2013); Member, Committee on Home Affairs (Aug. 2010 – Aug. 2011)
July 2010	Member, Consultative Committee for Ministry of Civil Aviation (July 2010 – July 2013)
May 2010	Member, Public Accounts Committee (May 2010 – May 2011)
Dec. 2009	Member, Select Committee on Commercial Division of High Courts Bill, 2009 (Dec. 2009 – July 2010)
Sept. 2009	Member, Court of Jawaharlal Nehru University (Sept. 2009 – May 2012); Member, Committee on Personnel, Public Grievances, Law and Justice (Aug. 2009 – Aug. 2010)
May 2008	Member, Committee of Privileges (May 2008 – Sept. 2010); Member, Committee on Home Affairs (May 2008 – May 2009); Member, Committee on Subordinate Legislation (May 2008 – Sept. 2009); Member, Committee on Welfare of SC/ST (May 2008 – May 2009; May 2016 – May 2019)
June 2008	Member, General Purposes Committee (June 2008 – July 2013; Aug. 2014 onwards)
Aug. 2007	Re-elected to Rajya Sabha (second term); Member, Consultative Committee for Shipping, Road Transport and Highways (Aug. 2007 – May 2009); Member, Spices Board (Aug. 2007 – Aug. 2010); Member, Committee on Water Resources (Aug. 2007 – May 2008)
Jan. 2000	Elected to Rajya Sabha (first term); Member, Committee on Communications (Jan. 2000 – April 2002); Member, Committee on Public Undertakings; Member, Committee on External Affairs; Member, Select Committee on Women’s Reservation Bill
1996	Member, Eleventh Lok Sabha

==== Others ====
Countries visited

- Gulf countries, under the chairmanship of Shri Atal Bihari Vajpayee, former Prime Minister of India
- Australia, to attend the Commonwealth Parliamentary Conference
- United States of America, to attend the United Nations General Assembly (2008, 2024)
- Mauritius, with delegation led by Smt. Meira Kumar, former Speaker of Lok Sabha
- Czech Republic, Croatia and Slovenia, with delegation led by Shri Mohammad Hamid Ansari, former Vice-President of India
- South Africa, with delegation led by Shri Pawan Kumar Bansal, former Minister of Parliamentary Affairs
- Bahrain, to attend Inter-Parliamentary Union Assembly (March 2023)
- Latin American countries, with delegation led by Shri M. Venkaiah Naidu, former Vice-President of India
- China
- France
- Spain
- Germany
- Singapore
- United Arab Emirates

== List of Positions Held ==
=== Rajya Sabha ===
Position	Party	Constituency	From	To	Tenure
Member of Parliament, Rajya Sabha (1st Term)	DMK	Tamil Nadu	14 Jan 2000	2 April 2002	2 years, 78 days
Member of Parliament, Rajya Sabha (2nd Term)	DMK	Tamil Nadu	25 July 2007	24 July 2013	5 years, 364 days
Member of Parliament, Rajya Sabha (3rd Term)	DMK	Tamil Nadu	3 April 2014	2 April 2020	5 years, 365 days
Member of Parliament, Rajya Sabha (4th Term)	DMK	Tamil Nadu	3 April 2020	2 April 2026	5 years, 364 days
Member of Parliament, Rajya Sabha (5th Term)	DMK	Tamil Nadu	3 April 2026	2 April 2032	5 years, 365 days

== Works published ==
(in Tamil)

- Kutravaali Koondil Socrates
- Thalainagiril Tamilan Kural
- Manaiviyidam Pesungal
- Speak To Your Wife Please
- Ethirpaaratha Thiruppam
- Kelungal! sollkiren...
- Murasoliyin Madiyil Thavazhnthavai
- Medaiyenum Vaseegaram
- Good Morning
- Menagavin Nambikkai
