= Laxmi Narayan Tripathi =

Indian LGBT activist

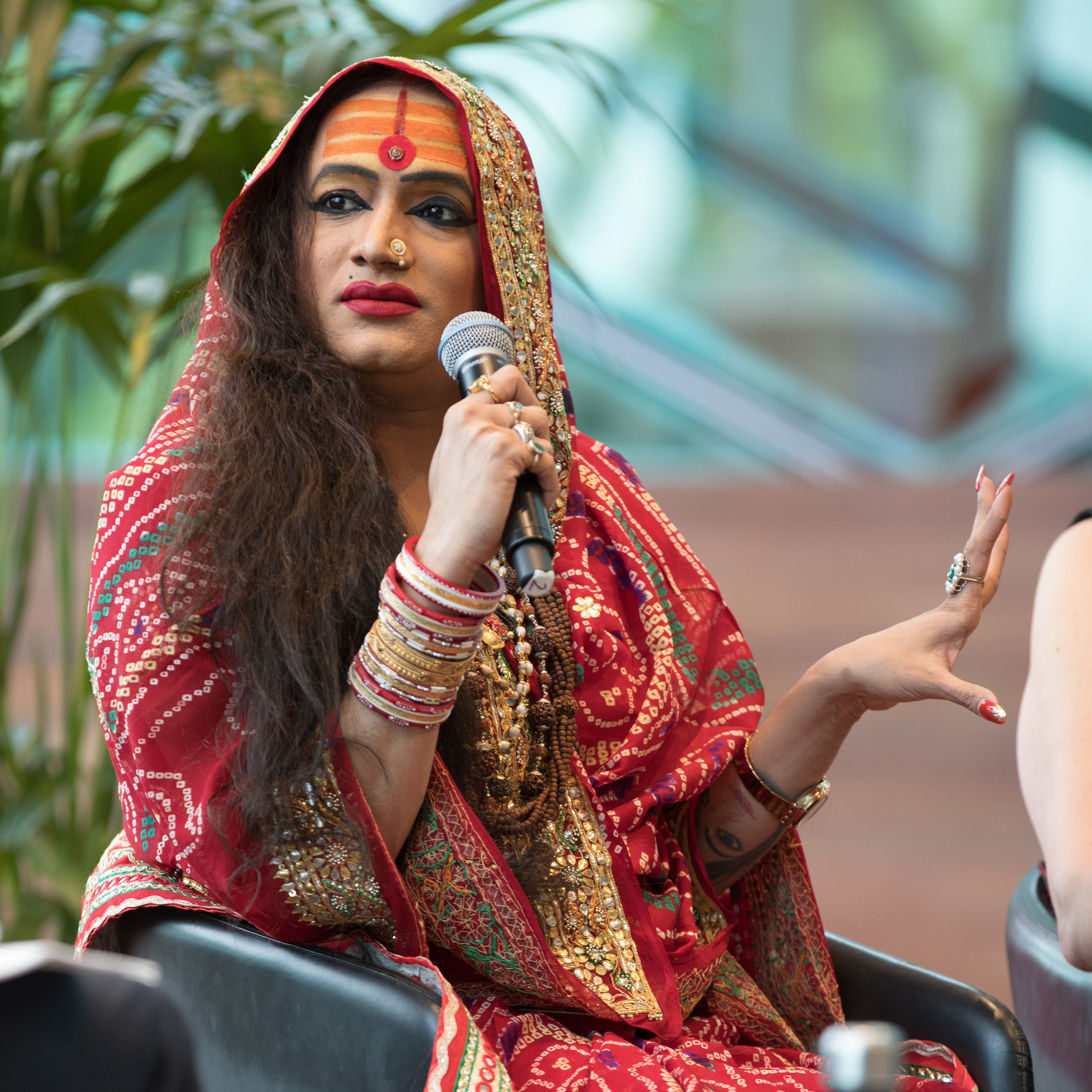
- Tripathi in 2017
- Born: 13 December 1978 (age 47); Thane, Maharashtra, India
- Citizenship: Indian
- Occupations: LGBT Activist; actress; dancer; Motivational speaker
- Years active: 2006–present

Laxmi Narayan Tripathi (known as Laxmi, sometimes transliterated as Lakshmi) is a transgender/hijra rights activist, actress, Bharatanatyam dancer, choreographer and motivational speaker in Mumbai, India. She is also the Acharya Mahamandaleshwar of the Kinnar Akhada. Despite rumours that she was removed from this appointment, Laxmi Narayan Tripathi leads the Akhara with the full support of the Akhara Parishad. She was born in Malti Bai Hospital on 13th Dec 1978 in Thane. She is the first transgender person to represent Asia Pacific in the UN in 2008. At the assembly, she spoke of the plight of sexual minorities. "People should be more human-like. They should respect us as humans and consider our rights as transgenders," she said. She was a contestant on the popular reality show Bigg Boss season 5 in 2011.

== Early life ==
Laxmi was the eldest born who was assigned male at birth into an orthodox Brahmin family in Thane, Maharashtra. After completing her schooling at Smt Sulochanadevi Singhania School Thane, she acquired an arts degree from Mumbai's Mithibai College and a postgraduate degree in Bharatnatyam. Often being told she was gay and being called "homo", in about grade 5 Laxmi sought out the only gay person she knew, Ashok Row Kavi. She starred in several Ken Ghosh dance videos and became a choreographer herself.

In a video for Project Bolo she recalls meeting the first PhD trans student in India, Shabira. She met the hijra community through Shabira and became a bar dancer soon after. She was famous for having admirers from across the city come to watch her dance. However, this was short-lived as Maharashtra home minister RR Patil decided to shut down the city's dance bars. Laxmi organized protests against this move. The dancers lost, but it marked Laxmi's first involvement in activism.

== Activism ==
Laxmi has served on the boards of several NGOs which conduct LGBT activist work. In 2002, she became president of the NGO DAI Welfare Society, the first registered and working organization for eunuchs in South Asia. In 2007, she started her own organization, Astitiva. This organization works to promote the welfare of sexual minorities, their support and development.

Soon after, she left India for the first time and headed to Toronto, Canada for an Asia Pacific sex workers network. Her passport stated that she was a "female, transgender, and eunuch".

When Kavi started to appeal Section 377 of the Indian Penal Code, which made homosexuality a crime, Laxmi joined his team. During a press conference with the media and Zee TV, she appeared in full makeup and women's clothing. Her parents found out about her association with the hijra community. It was shocking news to her parents as they were looking into marriage proposals. In an interview with BBC, her father was asked about his thoughts on his child's sexuality he responded, "if my child was handicapped, would you even ask me whether I'd have asked him to leave home? And just because his sexual orientation is different?"

In April 2014, Indian Supreme Court recognized transgender rights, officially recognizing them as a third gender, which gave relief to an estimated 3 million people within India. Laxmi along with a legal agency had petitioned the court to recognize transgender as a third category on all documents. Alongside this recognition, the courts have ordered the government to provide quotas in jobs and education similar to the ones for other minority groups in India. Governments were also ordered by apex courts to construct third washrooms and create health departments to care for transsexual medical needs. They will also be entitled to adopt children and, after sex reassignment surgery, identify with their gender.

== In popular culture ==
Laxmi frequently gives interviews and otherwise represents the LGBTQIA+ community in popular media. Laxmi has starred in several TV shows. She was a participant in the Indian television show Bigg Boss 5. She was evicted after six weeks. She also starred in Sach Ka Samna with Rajeev Khandelval, 10 Ka Dum with Salman Khan and Raaz Pichle Janam Ka.

In Sach Ka Samna, it was the first time India saw a transgender person on TV with their parents. Which allowed for there to be an open conversation about hijras and the myths surrounding them.

Laxmi starred in an award-winning documentary in 2005, Between the Lines: India's Third Gender.

Tripathi is featured in Project Bolo, a documentary series about LGBT Indians that has been released on DVD.

In 2011 Laxmi starred in Queens! Destiny Of Dance, an award-winning Bollywood movie about hijras that garnered rave reviews.

Laxmi co-wrote her biography, Red Lipstick, with Pooja Pande. The book was published by Penguin in 2016.

== Personal life ==
In Bigg Boss, Tripathi said she had been in a relationship with a man for two years. She is currently engaged to Indian trans man bodybuilder Aryan Pasha. She has adopted two children and lives in Thane.

She told Project Bolo that she got breast augmentation but did not receive any hormone therapy. She told them she got a lot of backlash from the hijra community for her speaking out and meeting Salman Rushdie.

== Awards ==
- Awarded 'Indian of the Year 2017'.

== Television ==
Year	Shows	Role	Channel	Notes
2011	Bigg Boss 5	Celebrity Contestant	Colors TV	Evicted in 6th Week Day 42
