= Chinmayee Jena v. State of Odisha =

Indian LGBT Rights Case Law

- Court: Orissa High Court
- Full case name: Chinmayee Jena versus State of Odisha & Ors.
- Decided: 24 August 2020
- Citation: W. P. (CRL) No. 57 of 2021

Court membership
- Judges sitting: S. K. Mishra J. and Savitri Ratho J.

Case opinions
- The right of self-determination of gender as an integral part of personal autonomy and self-expression.; Trans persons have the right to cohabit with the partner of their choice, regardless of the “gender” of the partner.
- Decision by: S. K. Mishra J. and Savitri Ratho J.

Keywords
- Cohabitation Rights, Transgender Recognition, Queer Relationships

Chinmayee Jena versus State of Odisha & Ors. (2020) is case where the Orissa High Court upheld the right of self-determination of gender as an integral part of personal autonomy and self-expression. The court recognized the rights of trans persons to cohabit with the partner of their choice, regardless of the “gender” of the partner.

The Supreme Court of India acknowledged this case in its publication titled "Sensitisation Module for the Judiciary on LGBTIQA+ Community" as one of the High Court judgments that effectively addressed the difficulties and obstacles experienced by queer individuals within the justice system due to their systemic marginalization.

== Background ==
The petitioner, a 24-year-old trans man, was born under the name Chinmayee Jena, and he has chosen the name Sonu Krishna Jena, engaged in a consensual relationship with his romantic partner since 2017. As their relationship progressed, the couple decided to reside together in their apartment located in Bhubaneshwar.

However, on April 9, 2020, Sonu Krishna Jena's partner was taken away from their apartment by her mother and uncle against her will. In reaction to this, Sonu Jena lodged complaints with Inspector In-Charge of Khandagiri Police Station in Bhubaneswar and Inspector In-Charge of Bari Police Station in Jajpur, but received no response. In the interim, he discovered that his partner's family had arranged a forced marriage for her with someone else. Seeking the issuance of a writ of Habeas Corpus, the petitioner urges the Court to demand his partner's presentation and appropriate action from the respondents.

== Proceedings ==
The petitioner's counsel submitted a Gender Dysphoria certification for a Transgender Person, issued by Dr. Amrit Pattojoshi, M.D. (Neuro-Psychiatry), of the Central Institute of Psychiatry in Ranchi. The certificate affirms that Sonu Krishna Jena experiences gender incongruence (referred to as gender dysphoria in DSM-5) and is devoid of any psychotic symptoms or other psychiatric conditions. Furthermore, the petitioner's counsel presented the joint affidavit from Sonu Krishna Jena and his partner, attested by the Executive Magistrate of Bhubaneswar on March 16, 2020, confirming their current cohabitation.

The Additional Advocate General representing the State Government of Orissa acknowledged the right of individuals of the same gender to live together and affirmed that the State is prepared to comply with any directives issued by the Court.

The Court has instructed the Superintendent of Police of Jajpur to determine the desires of Sonu Krishna Jena's romantic partner, including whether she intends to remain with the petitioner, and to ensure that her marriage is not solemnized against her wishes.

On August 17, 2020, the court held a video conferencing session with Sonu Krishna Jena's romantic partner. The justices clarified to her that the mere filing of the writ petition alleging illegal restraint did not compel her to join Sonu Krishna Jena if she chose otherwise. She was free to remain with her family if she so desired. Sonu Krishna Jena's romantic partner explicitly expressed her intention to join Sonu Krishna Jena without delay. However, the court did not issue an order on that day, deferring it to August 21, 2020, upon the request of the counsel representing the family of Sonu Krishna Jena's romantic partner.

On 21 August 2020, the counsel representing Sonu Krishna Jena's partner's family conveyed that the partner's widowed mother, like many Indian mothers, had faced considerable challenges while raising her two daughters, providing education with the aspiration of their self-sufficiency and eventual marriage. The counsel stated that Sonu Krishna Jena's partner's mother is disturbed by her daughter's choices and envisions a change of heart over time, expressing concerns about the future of both daughters, particularly Sonu Krishna Jena's partner, who has taken a path that diverges from societal norms. The counsel sought protective measures for the safety and well-being of Sonu Krishna Jena's partner, if the court rules in favor of Sonu Krishna Jena.

== Opinion of the Court ==
The court noted that Sonu Krishna Jena, who is of legal age and does not exhibit any psychological issues aside from gender incongruence (referred to as gender dysphoria in DSM-5), possesses typical cognitive functions, signifying that, as an adult, he holds the capacity to make medical decisions. The court drew upon the verdict of the Supreme Court in the case of National Legal Services Authority v. Union of India (2014), where it was established that self-determination of gender forms an integral part of personal autonomy and self-expression, falling within the ambit of personal liberty guaranteed by Article 21 of the Constitution. Importantly, the court cited the Yogyakarta Principles from the National Legal Services Authority v. Union of India (2014) verdict to affirm the inviolable nature of universal human rights for all individuals. Consequently, the court upheld the right of self-determination of gender as an integral part of personal autonomy and self-expression.

Additionally, the court relied on the verdict of the Supreme Court in the case of Navtej Singh Johar v. Union of India (2018), which upheld the entitlement of queer community members to the benefits of equal citizenship devoid of discrimination, and equal protection under the law. The court determined that Sonu Krishna Jena and his partner possess the right to choose their partner, including the right to cohabit. Consequently, the court directed the State Government of Odisha to extend various forms of protection to them, as outlined in Part III of the Constitution of India, including the right to life, the right to equality before the law, and the guarantee of equal protection under the law. Addressing the concerns raised by the family of Sonu Krishna Jena's partner, the court established that Sonu Krishna Jena's partner holds the rights accorded to women under the Protection of Women from Domestic Violence Act of 2005.

=== Concurring Opinion ===
In a concurring opinion, Justice Savitri Ratho emphasized that the array of preventive, remedial, and punitive measures designed to address honor crimes and related unlawful activities, as delineated by the Supreme Court in the Shakti Vahini v. Union of India (2018) case, is pertinent to the present case. Justice Savitri Ratho expressed that while the mother of Sonu Krishna Jena's partner has the option to invoke the Maintenance and Welfare of Parents and Senior Citizens Act of 2007 if Sonu Krishna Jena's partner fails to provide financial support, the family of Sonu Krishna Jena's partner should not disrupt the lives of Sonu Krishna Jena and his partner.

== Impact ==
Chinmayee Jena v. State of Odisha holds immense significance as India's pioneering judicial ruling explicitly acknowledging trans persons' rights to engage in a cohabiting relationship with their chosen partner, irrespective of the partner's gender. This decision establishes a robust precedent safeguarding cohabitation and partnership rights for queer Indians, further reinforcing the Supreme Court's verdicts in National Legal Services Authority v. Union of India (2014) and Navtej Singh Johar v. Union of India (2018).

The Supreme Court of India acknowledged this case in its publication "Sensitisation Module for the Judiciary on LGBTIQA+ Community," underscoring it as a significant example of a High Court confronting systemic hurdles encountered by queer individuals within the justice system, with the publication highlighting that the ruling provided due recognition to the self-identified gender identity and pronouns of a transgender man petitioner, consistently referring to him as he/him/his throughout the judgment.

== See also ==
- LGBT Rights in India
- Sultana Mirza v. State of Uttar Pradesh (2020)
- Navtej Singh Johar v. Union of India (2018)
- National Legal Services Authority v. Union of India (2014)
