= Meti (gender) =

Third-gender community of Nepal

Meti is a term used in the country of Nepal, and often refers to a feminine displaying and male-bodied individual. The term is said to originate from Darjeeling, India where it means "to quench one's thirst," alluding to meti sexual interactions with males.

Metis are an officially recognized third gender in the country of Nepal as of a Supreme Court ruling in 2007. As of this Supreme Court ruling, metis are able to be officially recognized by the Nepalese government and able to have a government-issued ID card listing “both” as an option under “gender." This also set a precedent of using self-determination as a source of proof in determining a person's eligibility in establishing a gender on government documents.

== Discrimination ==
Discrimination is a common issue among self-identified meti individuals. In 2004, 39 meti individuals were arrested and detained for "spreading perversion" and furthermore were unable to receive due process, as a result of the lack of LGBT support among Nepalese laws.

Meti are commonly associated with the Blue Diamond Society of Nepal. The society is an LGBT rights association devoted to crusading for the rights of marginalized LGBTQ+ individuals.

== HIV ==
There is a relatively high incidence of HIV among the meti community. This can be attributed, in part, to the unique struggle that meti face finding employment and acceptance in society. Many meti are pushed into the sex-industry working as prostitutes and are unwelcome in any other roles in society. As with issues of discrimination, the key to starting to solve the HIV epidemic among meti is making knowledge readily available and educating about safe-sex methods.
