= National Legal Services Authority v. Union of India =

Indian LGBT Rights Case Law

- Court: Supreme Court of India
- Decided: 15 April 2014
- Citation: 2014 INSC 275

Court membership
- Judges sitting: K. S. Radhakrishnan; A. K. Sikri

Keywords
- Constitution of India

National Legal Services Authority v. Union of India (2014) is a landmark judgement of the Supreme Court of India, which declared transgender people the 'third gender', affirmed that the fundamental rights granted under the Constitution of India will be equally applicable to them, and gave them the right to self-identification of their gender as male, female or third gender.

This judgement has been distinguished as a major step towards gender equality in India. Moreover, the court also held that because transgender people were treated as socially and economically backward classes, they will be granted reservations in admissions to educational institutions and jobs.

== Parties ==
The National Legal Services Authority of India (NALSA) was the primary petitioner. It had been constituted with the primary objective of providing free legal aid services to the disadvantaged sections of Indian society. The other petitioners in the matter were the Poojya Mata Nasib Kaur Ji Women Welfare Society, a registered society and NGO, and Laxmi Narayan Tripathy, a renowned Hijra activist.

== Bench ==
The case was heard by a two-judge bench of the Supreme Court, composed of Justice K.S. Panicker Radhakrishnan and Justice Arjan Kumar Sikri. Justice Radhakrishnan had functioned as a Standing Counsel for a number of educational and social organizations and held appointments in the High Courts of Kerala, Jammu and Kashmir and Gujarat before his elevation to the Supreme Court. Justice Sikri began legal practice in Delhi, specializing in Constitutional cases, and Labour, Service and Arbitration matters. Prior to his elevation to the Supreme Court, he served in the Delhi High Court and Punjab and Haryana High Court.

== Judgement ==
The Court has directed Centre and State Governments to grant legal recognition of gender identity whether it be male, female or third-gender:

- Legal Recognition for Third Gender: In recognizing the third gender category, the Court recognized that fundamental rights are available to the third gender in the same manner as they are to males and females. Further, non-recognition of third gender in both criminal and civil statutes such as those relating to marriage, adoption, divorce, etc. is discriminatory to transgender individuals.
- Legal Recognition for Persons transitioning within male/female binary: As for how the actual procedure of recognition will happen, the Court merely states that they prefer to follow the psyche of the person and use the "Psychological Test' as opposed to the 'Biological Test.' They also declare that insisting on Sex Reassignment Surgery (SRS) as a condition for changing one's gender is illegal.
- Public Health and Sanitation: Centre and State Governments have been directed to take proper measures to provide medical care to transgender people in hospitals and provide them separate public toilets and other facilities. Further, they have been directed to operate separate HIV/Sero-surveillance measures for transgender people.
- Socio-Economic Rights: Centre and State Governments have been asked to provide the community various social welfare schemes and to treat the community as socially and economically backward classes. They have also been asked to extend reservation in educational institutions and for public appointments.
- Stigma and Public Awareness: These are the broadest directions - Centre and State Governments were asked to take steps to create public awareness to better help incorporate transgender individuals into society and end treatment as untouchables; take measures to regain their respect and place in society; and seriously address the problems such as fear, shame, gender dysphoria, social pressure, depression, suicidal tendencies and social stigma.

The Court notes that these declarations are to be read in light of the Ministry of Social Justice and Empowerment Expert Committee Report on issues relating to transgender individuals.

A decade following the NALSA judgment, socio-legal research indicates a vast disparity between the court's mandates and grassroots reality. While the ruling established a foundational timeline for trans recognition, structural barriers, termed "implementational disenfranchisement" and "corrigible inequities", remain prevalent. Despite the judgment's directive to provide robust educational and vocational opportunities, bureaucratic hurdles have severely restricted the community's access to these constitutional protections.

== See also ==
- LGBT rights in India
- List of landmark court decisions in India
- Chinmayee Jena v. State of Odisha (2020)
- Justice K. S. Puttaswamy (Retd.) v. Union Of India (2017)
- Suresh Kumar Koushal v. Naz Foundation (2013)
- Trans People in India: A Decade after NALSA
