= LGBTQ history in Bangladesh =

The LGBT history in Bangladesh encompasses the historical context surrounding lesbian, gay, bisexual, and transgender people in the country. While pre-colonial Bengali folklore contains references to same-sex intimacy, the modern legal and social landscape was fundamentally shaped during the British Raj. In 1861, the colonial administration introduced Section 377 of the Indian Penal Code, which criminalized homosexuality. This statute was retained through the Pakistan era and officially incorporated into the Constitution of Bangladesh in 1972.

Throughout the 19th and 20th centuries, homosexuality remained a taboo. In the 21st century, organized LGBT activism slowly began to emerge. Advocacy groups such as the Boys of Bangladesh were formed, and in 2014, activists launched Roopbaan, the country's first LGBT magazine. However, it was met with severe backlash, including the 2016 assassination of Roopbaan chief editor Xulhaz Mannan.

Bangladeshi government continues to refuse the decriminalization of homosexuality, and authorities have occasionally utilized other charges, such as drug offenses, to raid and detain suspected homosexual individuals. A legal milestone was reached in 2014 when the national cabinet officially allowed the traditional hijra community to register as a "third gender," though they are still facing discrimination.

== Muslim rule in Bengal ==
A 14th century Bengali folklore tells the story of a homosexual relationship between two widows.

== British period ==
The Battle of Plassey led to the end of Muslim rule in Bengal. The British East India Company sat in the governance until the Indian Rebellion of 1857, after which Queen Victoria took responsibility of India and established the British Raj. In 1861, Section 377 of the Indian Penal Code criminalized homosexuality. The law stated that:

Whoever voluntarily has carnal intercourse against the order of nature with any man, woman or animal, shall be punished with transportation for life, or with imprisonment of either description for a term which may extend to ten years, and shall also be liable to fine.

— Ranchhoddas & Thakore, The Indian Penal Code, Section 377: Of Unnatural Offences.

Comments clarifying this section listed sodomy and the "carnal knowledge committed against nature by man with man" as a punishable offence.

Bengali Renaissance occurred in 19th century and early part of the 20th century, though it was limited only between Bengali Hindus of West Bengal;

== Pakistan period ==
Bengali Muslims created their homeland known as East Pakistan according to the Lahore Resolution of 1940. From the British period to the Independence of Pakistan no Bengali Muslim writer wrote anything on behalf of homosexuality. On the other hand, the old Section 377 of the Indian Penal Code was active in the Penal Code of Pakistan. Constitution of Pakistan of 1956 and Constitution of Pakistan of 1962 continued the British law regarding homosexuality which is criminalized according to the law.

The 1950s decade saw the introduction of the East Pakistan's (East Bengal / modern-day Bangladesh) film industry. 'Mukh O Mukhosh' (1956) was the first Bengali film made in East Pakistan which represented conservative heterosexual romance and arranged marriage. From the year 1956 to 1960s decade, all films followed this pattern. The Bengali Muslim literature sector also started to grow expeditiously during this period.

Pakistan was created as a Muslim nation, so Bengali Muslim writers and poets were given priorities rather than top Hindu Bengali writers who were prominents from the British period. British period's Muslim writers e.g. Kazi Nazrul Islam's writings were publicized. No Muslim Bengali intellectual is known to have written anything on behalf of homosexuality during Pakistan period of Bangladesh. Progressive values in educated Bengali Muslim society was to possess heteronormative values. In 1960s decade, there were reports to have some brothels in Dhaka University's adjacent areas e.g. the Shahbag area, where bacha bazi (sexual abuse on young adolescent males) was observed but adult homosexuality was not seen; Homosexuality remained taboo throughout 1947 to 1960s decade and to 1971 in which year Bangladesh seceded from Pakistan.

== Independent Bangladesh ==
Bangladesh became a separate country from Pakistan in 1971. In 1972, the Constitution of Bangladesh was created where the old Section 377 was also entered. In 2008, it was recorded that there were several male sex workers in Bogra.

Bandhu Social Welfare Society was founded in 1996. and 'Boys of Bangladesh was founded in 1999.

In 2013, Sanjida, a then 20-year-old Muslim woman, was arrested for loving, marrying and eloping with another girl. Charges against homosexuality were not brought and Sanjida was released from prison shortly after arrest. She was falsely accused of abducting her lover Puja, a Hindu girl.

In January 2014, the Cabinet of Bangladesh allowed hijras to legally register as third gender. In December 2014, the Ministry of Social Welfare invited hijra community members to apply for government positions, though some reported getting harassed during the interview process.

In the same year, 'Roopbaan' became the first time openly LGBT magazine in Bangladesh and focused on homosexual romance. However, the magazine shut down when its chief editor Xulhaz Mannan was murdered in 2016 by Islamic fundamentalists. The Bangladeshi government has refused to decriminalize homosexuality.

In May 2017, 28 suspected male homosexual youths were arrested in Keraniganj Upazila, Dhaka by Rapid Action Battalion on the grounds of drug abuse.

== See also ==
- LGBT rights in Bangladesh
- Timeline of LGBTQ history in Bangladesh

== Bibliography ==
- Vanita, Ruth; Kidwai, Saleem, eds. (2000). Same-Sex Love in India: Readings from Literature and History. Palgrave. ISBN 978-0-312-29324-6.
- Murray, Stephen O; Roscoe, Will (1997). Islamic Homosexualities: Culture, History, and Literature. New York University Press. ISBN 978-0-8147-7468-7.
- Lewis, David (2011). Bangladesh: Politics, Economy and Civil Society. Cambridge University Press. ISBN 9780521886123.
- Copf, David (2012). "Bengal Renaissance". In Islam, Sirajul; Jamal, Ahmed A. (eds.). Banglapedia: National Encyclopedia of Bangladesh (Second ed.). Asiatic Society of Bangladesh.
- Sengupta, Nitish (2011). Land of Two Rivers: A History of Bengal from the Mahabharata to Mujib. Penguin Books India. ISBN 9780143416784.
- Sen, Sukumar (1997). Bangala Sahityer Itihas, Vol.I, (in Bengali), Kolkata: Ananda Publishers. Ānanda Pābaliśārs. ISBN 81-7066-966-9.
- Allchin, Bridget; F. Raymond, Allchin (1982). The rise of civilization in India and Pakistan. Cambridge University Press. ISBN 978-0-521-24244-8.
- Zbavitel, Dušan (1976). Bengali Literature: A History of Indian Literature. West Germany: Harrassowitz Verlag. ISBN 978-3447016735.
