= Timeline of LGBTQ history in Bangladesh =

This is a timeline of notable events in the history of the lesbian, gay, bisexual, transgender and queer (LGBTQ) community in Bangladesh.

== Timeline of notable events ==
=== 14th Century ===
- Krittibas Ojha wrote Krittivasi Ramayan, which tells the story of two widows who have a same-sex relationship to bear an heir, Bhagiratha.

=== 19th Century ===
- 1861: The British colonial government introduces the Indian Penal Code (IPC) across the Bengal Presidency. Section 377 criminalizes homosexuality in the country.
- 1871: The Criminal Tribes Act was included in the Indian Penal Code, which prohibited identities such as hijra.

=== 20th Century ===
- 1956: Following the Partition of India, Section 377 was retained within the Penal Code of Pakistan.
- 1971: Bangladesh wins the War of Independence, separating from Pakistan. The new government retains the section in the Penal Code of Bangladesh.
- 1996: Bandhu Social Welfare Society is founded.
- 1997: The publication of ‘Somoprem o AIDS’ (‘same sex affect and AIDS’) marked the first efforts to raise awareness about male sexual health and HIV/AIDS needs to repeal Section 377.
- 1999: An underground online group called Gay Bangladesh and Teen_Gay_Bangladesh is formed.

=== 2000s ===
- 2001: Badhan Hijra Sangha, transgender community, was founded.
- 2002: Boys of Bangladesh (BoB) was founded and started as a Yahoo Groups.
- 2005: BoB wrote to The Daily Star to celebrate the International Day Against Homophobia.
- 2005: In Dhaka, BOB launched a safe sexual health campaign targeting gay men, alongside providing optional HIV testing services.
- 2006: BOB held discussions with UNAIDS country representative and aided in the facilitation of a survey on sexual diversity administered by Ain o Salish Kendra.
- 2007: Shawprova, a women's-only LGBT organisation, was founded.
- 2007: BRAC University held its first workshop on sexuality rights in a public setting.
- 17 May 2008: BoB celebrated the International Day Against Homophobia (IDAHO) marking the first time it appeared openly in public as a group of gay activists, with the venue authority's acknowledgment.
- December 2008: During the 2008 Bangladeshi general election, hijra individuals in Bangladesh voted for the first time.
- 2009: Shifting of approach of NGO in Bangladesh that at first focused on risk and disease to be more focused on the rights of the LGBT community.
- February 2009: The first report addressing Bangladesh's sexual and gender minorities was presented at the Universal Periodic Review, stating that section 377 is discriminatory to LGBTQ. But, the government of Bangladesh dismissed the report's advice to repeal Section 377, with the foreign minister going as far as to claim that homosexuality does not exist in the country.
- April 2009: Joya Sikder, a trans female activist who initially identified as hijra, became the president of the Sex Worker Network of Bangladesh, an organisation that focused on the rights of sex worker in Bangladesh.
- November 2009: The first LGBT festival in Bangladesh, called "Under the Rainbow," was held by the Goethe-Institut Dhaka and Bandhu Social Welfare Society.

=== 2010s ===
- November 2010: The second "Under the Rainbow," festival was held by Goethe-Institut Dhaka, Boys of Bangladesh (BoB), Badhon Hijra Shangha Shawprova and Bandhu Social Welfare Society.
- November 2011: The first LGBT short film was created and directed by Tanvir Alim and Arifur Rahman.
- 2011: The third "Under the Rainbow," festival was held by Goethe-Institut Dhaka, Boys of Bangladesh (BoB), Badhon Hijra Shangha and Shawprova and Bandhu Social Welfare Society.
- 2012: Amra Ki Etoi Bhinna won Best Documentary Short at the 2012 KASHISH Pride Film Festival .A
- July 2012: First lgbt movie titled Common Gender was released.
- 2013:The Cabinet of Bangladesh officially recognizes hijra as a distinct "third gender" and grants individuals the legal right to identify as hijra on passports, national identity cards, and voting registries.
- September 2013: Bangladesh rejected recommendation to abolish Section 377 after the Universal Periodic Review.
- January 2014: Roopbaan, Bangladesh's first LGBT magazine, is officially launched.
- April 2014: The first rainbow rally was held in Bangladesh.
- November 2014: A Hijra Pride event took place in Bangladesh.
- February 2015: Roopbaan published Roopongti, a queer poetry collection at the Ekushey Book Fair.
- February 2015: Avijit Roy was killed by Ansarullah Bangla Team.
- April 2015: Second rainbow rally was held in Dhaka.
- July 2015: The government's disqualified 12 out of 14 hijra candidates from a designated job quota after medical exams classified them as biologically male.
- September 2015 : Boys of Bangladesh (BoB) published Dhee, the first Bengali-language comic book to feature a lesbian protagonist.
