= Mohammad Muntasir Rahman =

Bangladeshi Queer Activist

- Born: Bangladesh
- Education: Ahsanullah University of Science and Technology
- Occupations: Civil engineer, human rights activist
- Organization: Byanjona Foundation
- Known for: LGBTQ+ rights advocacy
- Movement: July Uprising

Mohammad Muntasir Rahman is a Bangladeshi civil engineer, human rights activist, and LGBTQ+ rights advocate. He is a graduate of Ahsanullah University. He is associated with Byanjona Foundation, a feminist organization in Bangladesh. In 2025, Rahman was appointed to the founding committee of the National Citizens' Party (NCP). Conservative party members sharply criticized his appointment, highlighting his pro-queer advocacy, and after public controversy Rahman was removed.

== Activism ==
=== July Uprising ===
During the July Uprising of 2024, Rahman provided shelter to student activists fleeing police forces in Dhaka during the government-imposed internet blackout between 18 and 28 July 2024. NCP leader Abdul Hannan Masud later stated that, after being pursued by security forces at Kuwait-Maitree Hospital in Uttara, he and fellow student activists had taken refuge with Rahman's assistance in the offices of an international organization.

=== National Citizens' Party committee membership ===
In February 2025, the National Citizens' Party (NCP) appointed Rahman to its 151-member founding committee. However, a few hours after the announcement, his homosexual orientation became a topic of controversy in the media. For a few days, most media coverage of the NCP focused on Rahman.

Following objections from conservative NCP leaders Hasnat Abdullah and Sarjis Alam, Rahman was removed from the expanded 217-member convening committee on 1 March 2025. JusticeMakers Bangladesh in France, a France-based human rights organization, condemned the removal and the social media commentary directed at Rahman and the broader LGBTQ+ community.

== Pro-Queer activism ==
Rahman advocated for gender equality and sexual minority rights in Bangladesh through social media and local activist groups. In October 2025, Rahman defended Sahara Chowdhury and transgender rights during her hunger strike at Shaheed Minar, Dhaka.

== See also ==
- Sahara Chowdhury
- LGBT rights in Bangladesh
- July Uprising
- National Citizen Party (Bangladesh)
- Hasnat Abdullah
- Sarjis Alam
