= Sahara Chowdhury =

LGBTQ-rights activist from Bangladesh

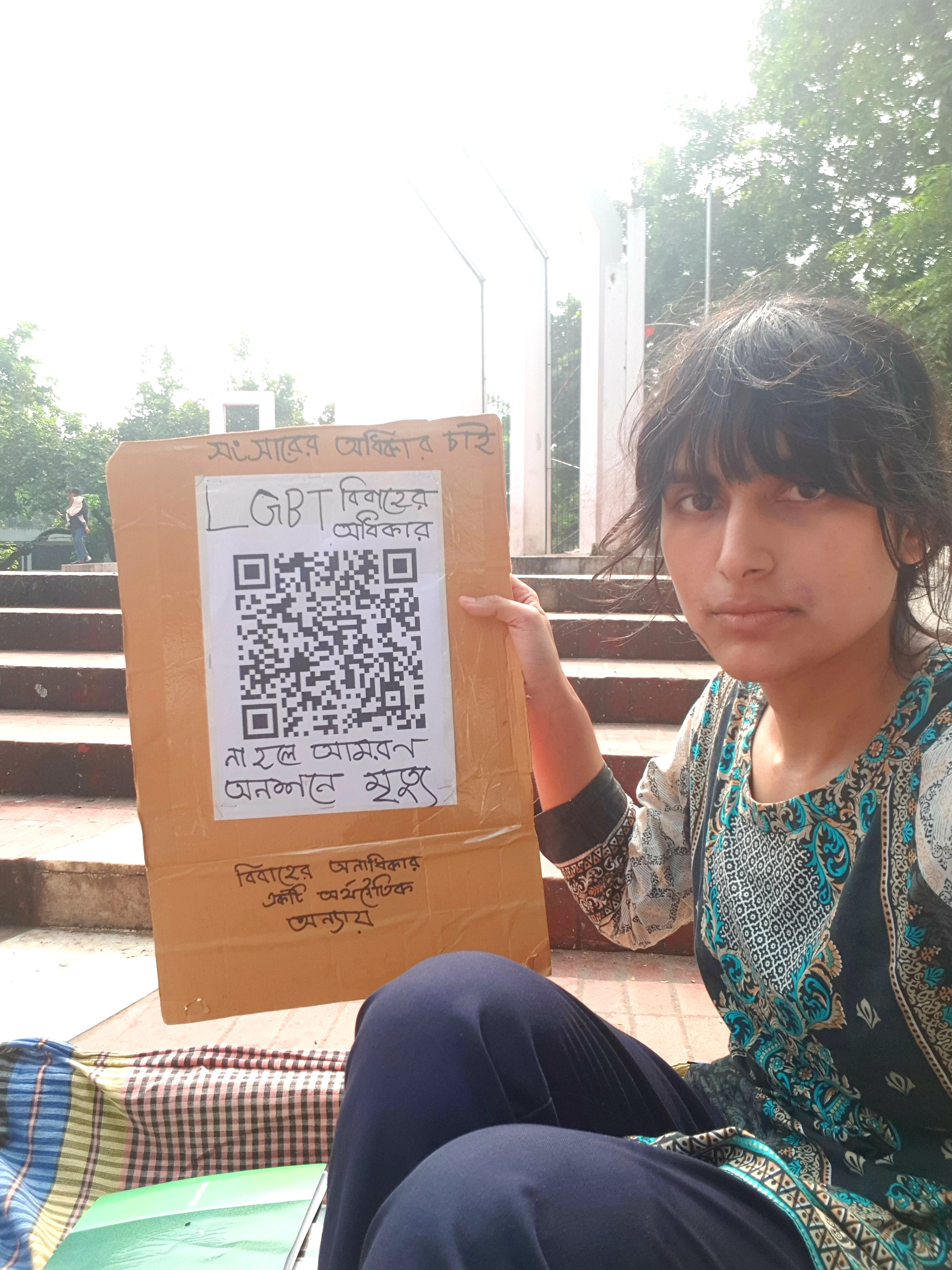
- Chowdhury during her hunger strike for LGBT marriage rights at Central Shahid Minar, Dhaka
- Born: Safwan Chowdhury Rabil; 2002 (age 23–24)
- Education: Metropolitan University, Sylhet (expelled)
- Known for: LGBTQ activism in Bangladesh
- Notable work: Bangladeshi Queer Manifesto: A Manifesto on Queer Vigilantism

Sahara Chowdhury (Bengali: সাহারা চৌধুরী; born Safwan Chowdhury Rabil, Bengali: সাফওয়ান চৌধুরী রেবিল) is a Bangladeshi July Uprising figure and same-sex marriage rights advocate. A transgender woman, she gained prominence following her expulsion from Metropolitan University, Sylhet, civil rights activism and authoring a text titled Bangladeshi Queer Manifesto.

== Early life and education ==
In childhood, Chowdhury's family's work included frequent moves to live in various villages in the Chittagong Division. When she was older, her family moved to Sylhet.

She joined the Metropolitan University, Sylhet in 2022 to study English. After joining university, she came out as a trans woman, including using female restrooms with permission from the authorities. In 2024, she joined the protests in the July Revolution and acted as an organizer for protesters from her university while doing her third year of studies.

== Expulsion from university ==
On 14 August 2025, Chowdhury was expelled "for life" from the university for carrying a knife on grounds, for posts on social media, and for accusations of having made threats to homophobic social media influencers opposing LGBTQ+ rights, including Asif Mahtab Utsha and Sorowar Hussain. Her supporters claimed that the university's anti-LGBTQ sentiment was the cause of this — as the university proctor claimed that she violated societal laws and culture due to being transgender, that the university authorities were aware and had permitted her to carry a knife in the campus for self-protection, and protested the expulsion with a petition and statements. 162 people from Bangladeshi civil society signed a public letter condemning Metropolitan University for her expulsion, as well as continuing to demand her reinstatement later on in petitions against "mob terror", framing her as a victim. Later at a press conference, she highlighted how the influencers she was accused of sending death threats to committed genocide denial of LGBT people by denying their contribution and opposing their registry in government website for martyrs in the July Revolution— and the preceding year of violence and social exclusion suffered by queer people as a result of that rhetoric. In the statement, she claimed that she was denied due process amidst a severe campaign of transphobic harassment, that she had abstained from drinking water during daytime while studying at the university to avoid using the restroom facilities due to transphobic campaigns against allowing her to use either the male or female washrooms, that her peers weaponized her academic success as the class topper by fabricating conspiracy theories alleging Western organizations paid her faculty to falsely inflate her grades, and that in an attempt to mock the death and rape threats she had received from university peers, she openly published her public whereabouts on social media and dared people to attack her to prove that she refused to hide from intimidation.

== Activism ==
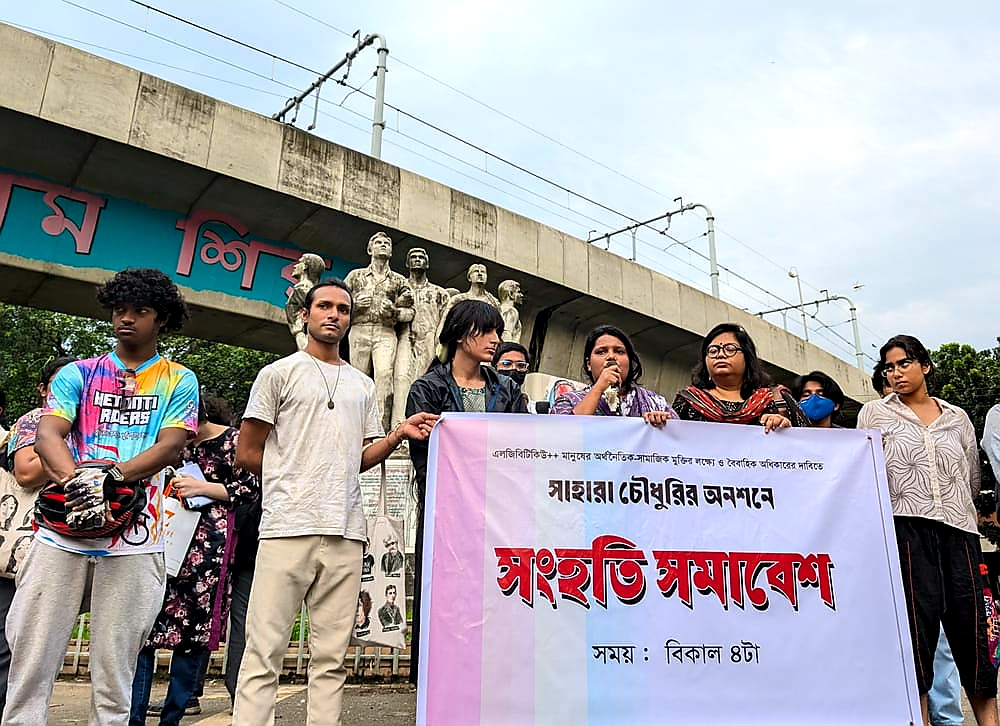
Chowdhury at a public rally of activists demanding LGBT marriage rights and anti-discrimination laws, University of Dhaka, October 2025

=== LGBTQ activism ===
Sahara Chowdhury has been the subject of a controversy for authoring a book titled Bangladesh Queer Manifesto that called for violent methods of securing LGBT rights, including bombing police stations should they arrest people due to their queer identity, with the core thesis of the manifesto being that the purpose of the anti-LGBT system is not to eradicate queer people, but to systematically exploit them by funneling them into a disposable underclass of sex workers for the ruling class. Regarding the call for violence, she argued she was merely mimicking the tone of right wing extremists online for satirical purposes and later published a less violent iteration of the manifesto that focused more on the negative material impact of the lack of lgbt rights.

On 21 September 2025, Chowdhury led a demonstration with around fifty people at the Central Shaheed Minar and burnt an effigy of Independent University, Bangladesh faculty Mohammad Sorowar Hossain after he publicly opposed menstrual education and care, declaring them to be "Western agenda".

On 10 October 2025, she began a hunger and thirst strike at Shaheed Minar to demand rights for same-sex marriage and LGBTQ marriage rights. Her protest ended, after a public rally of LGBT people and allies who stood with her to demand legal LGBT marriage rights and anti-discrimination laws, when she collapsed from fatigue and her friends carried her away to recover. There have been accusations of a Bangladeshi mainstream media blackout, refusing to cover her case, while some regarded any coverage at all as a victory in itself. Chowdhury later appeared in a Netra News report covering queer rights in the country.

Following a homophobic mob attack on individuals accused of homosexuality at Shahbagh on 10 April 2026 by a local group named Azadi Andolon vowing to free the area of "homosexual programs", she stood on the same spot with a rainbow flag decorated banner declaring herself to be homosexual, alleging police complicity in allowing the previous attack to happen and daring the group to come and attack her "if they can", which they proceeded not to do. The police proceeded to declare Section 144 to get the LGBT activists to vacate but they refused to do so and carried the protest to completion.

In an article, Sahara Chowdhury later accused undercover intelligence agents of actively spreading homophobic rhetoric and threatening LGBT activists to maintain selective populism. She also drew attention to the opposition to gay marriage and transgender rights from western academics who self-identified as pedophiles, such as David Thorstad and Germaine Greer among others, to discuss how the inequality for queer people directly enables sexual predators with an incentive to preserve said inequality. In her writings, Sahara Chowdhury criticized the works of queer theorists and postcolonial scholars, such as Adnan Hossain and Liz Mount, who romanticize or deny the abuse and exploitation of hijra chelas done by hijra gurumas — she accused Liz Mount of transmisogyny for arguing that trans women in South Asia inherently create a hierarchy above hijra people by seeking citizenship.

=== Pro-Palestine activism ===
She has also vocalized strong anti-American and anti-Israeli sentiments, declaring "Free, free Palestine. Death to America, death to Israel" in a public conference hosted by her in support of LGBT rights.

== Bangladeshi Queer Manifesto ==
The Bangladeshi Queer Manifesto: A Manifesto on Queer Vigilantism authored by Sahara Chowdhury Rabil presents a materialist critique of anti-LGBTQ+ sentiment, framing it primarily as a mechanism of capitalist and feudal systems rather than one sourced by religious or moral imperative. Central to the text is the application of Stafford Beer's dictum — "the purpose of a system is what it does" — to argue that the "purpose" of the homophobic and transphobic social order worldwide is the creation of a disposable, sexually exploitable class of queer bodies. While she predominantly uses examples from Bangladesh and South Asia, she claims that this pattern is similar internationally as well.

She argues that the ruling class views women primarily as "womb machines" tasked with producing a surplus of workers and soldiers to keep the wage equilibrium low. Within this framework, marriage is defined strictly as a ritual of reproduction. The author posits that the same logic used to deny LGBTQ+ marriage — that it is non-reproductive — is the same logic that legitimizes child marriage and marital rape. If marriage's sole purpose is reproduction, then the victim's consent is secondary to the "fulfillment" of the reproductive contract. Consequently, queer bodies, being deemed non-marriageable due to lack of reproduction, are relegated to a "non-rapeable" status where their sexual violation is not seen as a legal or moral trespass.

Referring to the phenomenon of conservatives consuming transgender pornography at a high rate and the popularity of transgender pornography rising while transgender rights are threatened globally, the author argues that it is not a mere coincidence or hypocrisy — but rather the very intent of the system is to disenfranchise transgender people into staying trapped in sexually exploitative professions by denying them legal rights and sequestering them from society and public discourse through othering and taboofication.

She offers a direct critique of academic and activists who use theories such as homonationalism and homocolonialism to frame the pursuit of legal civil rights (like marriage) as a neoliberal or Western-imposed agenda. The author dismisses the idea that queer marriage rights are inherently "homonationalistic", arguing that states — specifically citing Israel — engage in "pinkwashing" and nationalist branding regardless of whether they actually grant such rights. As well as disregarding claims about marriage rights "deradicalising" LGBT people, arguing it's meaningless identity politics and that people like Roy Cohn and J Edgar Hoover were always carrying out activities in favor of the state and capital regardless of legal rights and that LGBT people are carrying out anarchist and Marxist praxis in countries with LGBT rights long after being granted them.

She strongly opposes decolonial scholars who romanticize historical systems of "tolerance", such as the Hijra or Ghetuputra traditions, the author characterizes these not as indigenous alternatives to Western patriarchy, but as forms of "ghettoization" that create exploitable supply chains of queer labor and "young flesh" for the bourgeoisie. As well as identifying a class conflict inherent between the prostituted hijra underlings and their guruma, who tend to traditionally assume the role of the pimp.

The author rejects the queer-leftist argument that marriage is an inherently patriarchal institution that should be avoided. She argues that because traditional marriage is a "ritual of reproduction" designed to produce workers and soldiers, queer marriage — being non-reproductive — acts as a material subversion of the patriarchal and capitalist state. She also argues that in this context the secretive survival sex work of queer individuals without legal rights is not a subversion of heteropatriarchal norms but rather a reinforcement of it.

The Manifesto defines conversion therapy not as a medical or psychological endeavor, but as a ritual of performative repentance designed to enforce social and economic compliance. The author argues that the ruling class and religious institutions recognize the immutability of queer identities, yet mandate conversion practices as a mechanism for individuals to publicly signal their submission to the patriarchal and reproductive order. According to the text, this process functions as a gatekeeping ritual: by "performing" a cure or repentance, the queer individual is granted re-entry into "legitimate" society and the workforce, effectively trading their authentic identity for the stability of a heteronormative life while maintaining sexual exploits in secrecy. Ultimately, the manifesto posits that conversion therapy serves a systemic purpose by reinforcing the hierarchy, ensuring that even those who cannot be "changed" are effectively silenced and co-opted back into the service of capitalist reproduction.

She critiques liberalism and NGOs, accusing them of intentionally maintaining the homophobic and transphobic status quo to perpetuate the necessity of queer NGOs and charity organizations in order to keep on securing funds, which would become redundant if equality was achieved. The author suggests that the first world utilizes these NGOs to keep the third-world queer population in a state of destitution, which in turn fuels human trafficking rings that provide labor and sex work to the global north.

The text argues that the perceived "backwardness" of the Bangladeshi masses is a myth manufactured by the ruling class to maintain the status quo and obstruct human rights progress. The author asserts that systemic issues, such as the suppression of LGBT, women's, and indigenous rights, are not the result of organic public sentiment, but are instead fueled by "selective populism" and state-sponsored violence designed to protect existing social hierarchies. By critiquing both the right-wing and "liberal" NGOs, she claims that dismissing civil rights campaigns as "impossible" due to public unreadiness is a political tool used to keep marginalized groups stratified.

The manifesto concludes by rejecting the possibility of peaceful reform within a system that benefits from the "geno-exploitation" of queer children. The author argues that for the minority, "utilitarianism" must be achieved through the disruption of the majority’s safety. Framing the struggle as a choice between a "sustainable" hundred-year status quo of sexual slavery and the "peace" of total erasure, the author advocates for violent revolution and property destruction as the only moral imperatives left to dismantle the current social system.

== See also ==
- LGBTQ rights in Bangladesh
- Human rights in Bangladesh
- Xulhaz Mannan
