= Adnan Hossain =

Sociologist and anthropologist of gender and sexuality

Adnan Hossain is a sociologist and anthropologist researching hijra people, masculinity, and transgender and intersex people in Bangladesh. He is a lecturer in sociology at the University of Glasgow.

== Education and career ==
Hossain has said that his interest in hijras began in childhood, when he encountered them in his own household and in public spaces near his home. He received a PhD from the University of Hull in 2013.

He was a postdoctoral fellow funded by the European Research Council at the University of Amsterdam, a research affiliate of the Amsterdam Centre for Research on Gender and Sexuality, and a visiting scholar at the University of the West Indies St. Augustine campus in Trinidad and Tobago. In 2019 he was affiliated with the Vrije Universiteit Amsterdam. He then became assistant professor of gender studies and critical theory in the Graduate Gender Programme at Utrecht University, and joined the University of Glasgow in 2023.

At Glasgow he is a founding member of the Glasgow Lab for Intersex, Non-binary and Trans Studies (GLINTS), and leads a project on trans political activism and leadership in the Global South, funded by the Open Society Foundations from 2024 to 2026.

== Research ==
Hossain's work questions the common view of hijras as an emasculated, asexual third sex. He argued that people become hijra through repeated ritual and gender practices known as hijragiri, "the occupations of the hijra", which includes begging, sex work and procuring, rather than what he refers to as 'emasculation', which includes taking hormonal medicine, gender reassignment surgery, or orchiectomy.

His book Beyond Emasculation: Pleasure and Power in the Making of Hijra in Bangladesh (2021) builds on this idea. Hossain describes hijra life as an alternative culture that pushes against society's dominant idea of manhood. In his account, many hijras see themselves as distinct from both men and women, though this opinion varies among individuals and communities. He argues that hijra groups offer people assigned male at birth a space to desire men, take on feminine roles, and pursue sexual pleasures that mainstream Bangladeshi society shames or forbids. Although his book contains various incidents of Hijra gurumas 'correcting' hijra chelas through forced starvation and denial of water, beatings, and shaving of heads — as well as hijra chelas having to sign a stamped contract where they agree that they must pay a certain sum to the hijra guruma if they ever try to leave the guruma's gharana (which the author himself agrees might be difficult for the chela and rarely ever happens) — Adnan Hossain posits that the guruma holds no abusive power over the chela and the class division in the community is essential for the division of tasks within the commune.

Hossain argues that hijras should not be described as transgender. He proposes the concept of “male femininity.” He also criticizes what he calls the “rescue mentality” of many aid, NGO, and government programs that aim to help hijras, such as health, rehabilitation, sex education (which, according to him, is a threat and disrespectful to the traditionally secretive sexual practices of the hijras) and job-training initiatives, arguing that they treat hijras only as victims in need of saving. Although he posits that hijra people are not transgender women and that the identity is closer to a profession, he also argues that transgender women who do not identify as hijra refuse to do so due to being classist against hijra people.

Based on his fieldwork in Dhaka, Hossain reports that some of his interlocutors moved between a hijra role and that of a masculine, married householder. He also writes that, in his interpretation, many of the hijras he worked with regarded being hijra as closer to a profession than to a sexuality or gender identity.

Although in South Asian political rhetoric hijra rights are favored over transgender rights, Adnan Hossain posits that South Asian legal and political frameworks privilege a "respectable" modern transgender identity at the expense of traditional hijra communities, he defends hierarchical guru-chela networks (Gurumas are often accused of abusing chelas) while referring to trans women's desire for economic mobility and protection from exploitation as assimilationist, and trans women as bourgeois and neo-liberal. He insists that the tradition of Hijra gurumas forcing chelas into coerced sex work and begging for profit is an act of resistance against hetero-patriarchal lifestyles and codifying it as 'forced labor' or 'bonded labor' constitutes a form of colonial oppression. Adnan Hossain is also cited by other scholars, such as Liz Mount, whose works echo a similar sentiment, who posit that the existence of trans women in South Asian society denigrates hijra gurumas, and that reporting abuses committed by older gurumas against younger hijra chelas to state authorities for intervention constitutes an empowerment of oppressive state mechanisms— and that social workers who do intervene in the abuse of Hijra chelas by their gurumas are financially motivated to do so.

Other researchers and rights organizations have described hijra primarily as a gender identity. Human Rights Watch defines hijra as an identity category for people assigned male at birth who develop a feminine gender identity, and public health researchers in Dhaka have described hijras as a transgender group. A report by the International Republican Institute describes hijras in Bangladesh as identifying as female or nonbinary and groups them with transgender women.

A second strand of his work concerns the legal recognition of hijras. He argued that while the international community saw the policy as a step forward for sexual rights, it rested on a local view of hijras as people born with "missing" or ambiguous genitals and without sexual desire. In his account, the campaign for recognition gained mainstream support because the public regarded hijra status as an innate, God-given physical condition, while the sexual health activists behind it did not challenge Section 377, which criminalizes same-sex relations.

He also adds that legal recognition and development programmes try to turn hijras into respectable citizens by recasting them as protibondhi (disabled), treating badhai and cholla (the collection of money and food from markets) as extortion, and reinforcing distinctions between "real" and "fake" hijras.

Hossain has also criticized how much hijra research focuses on India, arguing that this focus makes hijras seem like a single, fixed category.

== Selected publications ==
- Hossain, Adnan (2021). Beyond Emasculation: Pleasure and Power in the Making of Hijra in Bangladesh. Cambridge University Press. ISBN 9781316517048.
- Hossain, Adnan; Pamment, Claire; Roy, Jeff (2022). Badhai: Hijra-Khwaja Sira-Trans Performance across Borders in South Asia. Methuen Drama. ISBN 9781350174535.
- Hossain, Adnan (2012). "Beyond Emasculation: Being Muslim and Becoming Hijra in South Asia". Asian Studies Review. 36 (4): 495–513. doi:10.1080/10357823.2012.739994. hdl:1871.1/5e919b3d-46d7-4a44-8913-4324fa1e1a52.
- Hossain, Adnan (2017). "The paradox of recognition: hijra, third gender and sexual rights in Bangladesh". Culture, Health & Sexuality. 19 (12): 1418–1431. doi:10.1080/13691058.2017.1317831. PMID 28498049.
- Hossain, Adnan (2018). "De-Indianizing hijra: intraregional effacements and inequalities in South Asian queer space". TSQ: Transgender Studies Quarterly. 5 (3): 321–331. doi:10.1215/23289252-6900710.
- Hossain, Adnan; Rahman, Momin (2024). "Beyond homocolonialism: working towards queer decoloniality in Bangladesh". International Politics. doi:10.1057/s41311-024-00636-y.
