= Intifada Bangladesh =

Islamist organization in Bangladesh

- ইন্তিফাদা বাংলাদেশ
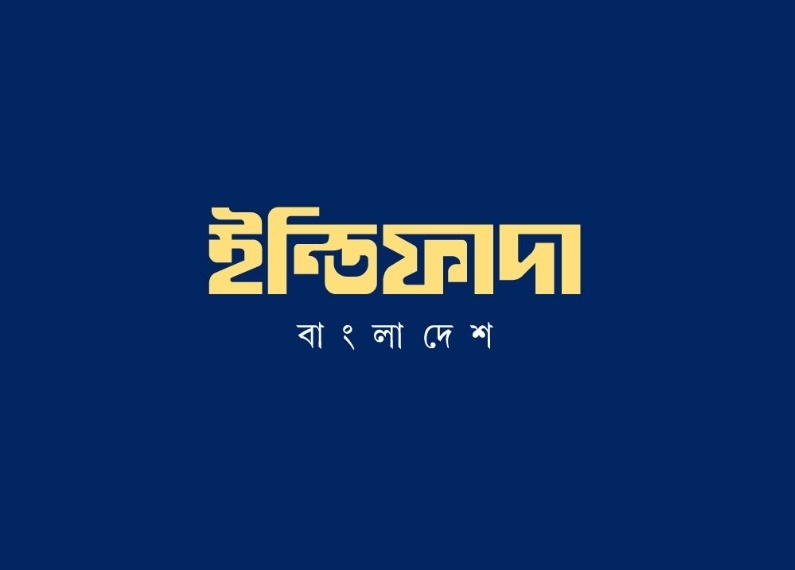
- Formation: July 2025
- Legal status: Active
- Purpose: Advocacy of Islamism
- Headquarters: Dhaka, Bangladesh
- Official language: Bengali
- Leader: Asif Adnan
- Affiliations: Hefazat-e-Islam Bangladesh (factional)

Intifada Bangladesh is an Islamist organization in Bangladesh, established in July 2025. It gained attention for its opposition to foreign involvement in Bangladesh's internal affairs, particularly regarding the United Nations Human Rights Office.

== Background ==
Following the July Uprising, which led to the resignation and exile of prime minister Sheikh Hasina and the collapse of the Awami League government, the country underwent a transitional period under an interim government led by economist Muhammad Yunus. During this time, various political and religious groups, including Islamist organizations, reemerged in public discourse.

== Leadership ==
The organization's leadership includes clerics such as Jasimuddin Rahmani, known for their public preaching, alongside figures like Asif Adnan, a preacher and social media influencer associated with the movement. These leaders have expressed critical views of secularism and democratic governance, advocating for a political system aligned with Islamic principles.

== History ==
On 26 July 2025, Intifada Bangladesh organized a protest at Shapla Chattar, Dhaka, following Friday prayers. Protesters called for the removal of the United Nations Human Rights Office from Bangladesh, accusing it of political interference and bias towards figures from the previous regime. The demonstration highlighted the movement's stance against perceived foreign influence in national affairs.

Two activists, Asif Mahtab and Sarwar Hossein, affiliated with the organization, received death threats from a Facebook account that posted an image captioned, "Me and my homies playing football with Asif Mahtab's head."

On 24 October 2025, in a gathering was held at the north gate of the Baitul Mukarram, Intifada Bangladesh that demanded a ban on ISKCON in Bangladesh.

== See also ==
- Islamization in Bangladesh under Muhammad Yunus
- Aftermath of the July Uprising
- LGBTQ rights in Bangladesh
