= LGBTQ rights in Bangladesh =

- Bangladesh
- Legal status: Illegal
- Penalty: Up to life imprisonment with fines for same-sex sexual activity
- Gender identity: Third gender recognised since 2013–2014, de facto restrictions for transgender people
- Military: No
- Discrimination protections: No

Family rights
- Recognition of relationships: No
- Adoption: No

Lesbian, gay, bisexual, transgender, and queer (LGBTQ) people in Bangladesh face widespread social and legal challenges not experienced by non-LGBTQ people.

Homosexuality is illegal and criminalised under Bangladeshi law, which is inherited from the colonial British Indian government's Section 377 of 1860. According to the law, the punishment for engaging in same-sex sexual activities is up to life imprisonment with fines. It is used to arrest, harass and extort individuals based on their sexual orientation.

In 2014, hijras gained official third gender recognition codified by the Cabinet of Bangladesh, with voter lists offering third gender options and hijra candidates running for government positions, though other communities of transgender people remain unrecognised and are unprotected from discrimination.

Homosexuality is widely disapproved in Bangladesh with no legal protections against discrimination. Lesbian, gay, bisexual, transgender, and queer-identifying individuals frequently report harassment, discrimination, abuse, and violence for their gender identity and sexual orientation. While hijras are generally viewed to be more accepted rhetorically and ideologically, they materially face severe discrimination and unequal access to various social services like housing and health care. Scholars note that in the absence of a formal legislative framework and employment opportunities for transgender individuals in Bangladesh, many young transfeminine people enter the traditional, hierarchical hijra gharana system, where financial payments for protection can lead to bonded labor, exploitation, and forced sex work under the authority of the guruma.

== Legality of same-sex sexual activity ==
Homosexuality has historically been a strong social taboo in Bangladesh. However, Bangladeshi brothels do have male prostitutes for homosexual clients.

Formal laws against homosexuality were imposed by the British when Bangladesh was a part of British India; they were enacted in 1860 through the Indian Penal Code and went into effect in 1862. These laws were carried over into the Pakistan Penal Code following the partition of India in 1947, and continue to be part of Bangladesh's legal code since its independence from Pakistan in 1971. In 2009 and 2013, the Bangladeshi Parliament refused to overturn Section 377.

Section 377 ("Unnatural offences") of the Penal Code forbids anal and oral sex, regardless of the gender and sexual orientation of the participants:

Whoever voluntarily has carnal intercourse against the order of nature with any man, woman or animal, shall be punished with imprisonment for life, or with imprisonment of either description for a term which may extend to ten years, and shall also be liable to fine.

Explanation: Penetration is sufficient to constitute the carnal intercourse necessary to the offence described in this section.

The ambit of Section 377 extends to any sexual union involving penile insertion. Thus, even consensual heterosexual acts such as fellatio and anal penetration may be punishable under this law.

== Recognition of relationship and adoption for same-sex couples ==
Bangladeshi law does not recognise same-sex relationship, civil unions, or any kind of domestic partnership for couples of the same sex nor does Bangladeshi society recognise them. Even heterosexual relationships are impeded by social conservatism as, culturally, society is largely based on "marriage arranged by guardian" system. Despite restrictions, same-sex relationships are often reported in Bangladesh. Couples have been detained and can be imprisoned and/or fined by the authorities. There is no legal route for adoption for same-sex couples in Bangladesh.

== Gender identity ==
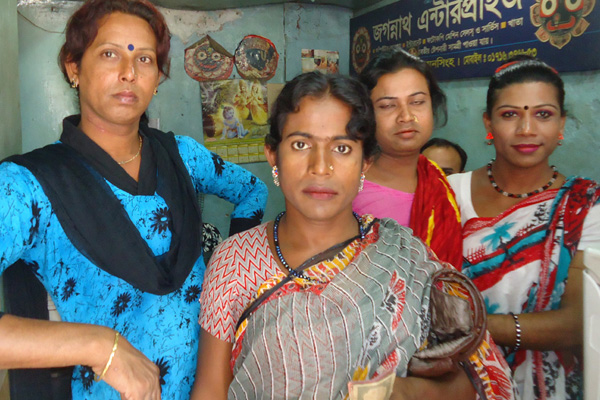
A group of hijras in Mymensingh

On 11 November 2013, hijras were recognized as a separate gender by the Bangladeshi Government in a cabinet meeting chaired by Prime Minister Sheikh Hasina. Along with males and females, hijras will be identified as a separate gender on official documents. A survey by the Ministry of Social Welfare showed that as of 2013, there are 10,000 registered hijras in the country. Despite this, Bangladesh does not have policies outlining measures individuals must undergo to legally change their gender on their official documents, nor is there clarity about who may qualify as a hijra. Additionally, no protections from discrimination exist for Hijra (South Asia) in Bangladesh.

In December 2014, the Ministry of Social Welfare invited hijras to apply for government employment. In January 2015, the Ministry of Health issued a memorandum requesting that "necessary steps are taken to identify hijras by conducting thorough medical check-ups". These check-ups resulted in hijras having to strip check and have their genitals confirmed. Photographs of these check-ups were later released to confirmed that hijras are "really men". In July 2015, after a hijra witnessed the murder of a secular blogger, and successfully helped in the arrest of the perpetrators, who were Islamic radicals, the Bangladeshi government announced plans to recruit and enlist hijras as traffic police. In April 2019, it was reported that Bangladesh will allow the "hijra" to vote under their proper gender identity, as officials have introduced "hijra" as a third gender option on voting forms for the first time. A project has been initiated to offer government-constructed houses to individuals who are homeless or lack land ownership. In Bangladesh, where the national population exceeds 170 million, there are approximately 12,000 transgender individuals.

Bangladesh opened its first religious school for transgender people in Dhaka. More than 150 students were initially expected to study Islamic and vocational subjects for free. Classes started from 7 November 2020. There was no age limit set for the enrollment of students.

== Persecution ==
=== United States Department of State report ===
In 2017, the United States Department of State report highlighted the human rights abuses against LGBTQ people in Bangladesh:

- "The most significant human rights issues included: extrajudicial killings, torture, arbitrary or unlawful detentions, and forced disappearances by government security forces; restrictions on civil liberties, including freedom of speech, press, and the activities of non-governmental organizations (NGOs); a lack of freedom to participate in the political process, corruption, violence, and discrimination based on gender, religious affiliation, caste, tribe, including indigenous persons, and sexual orientation and gender identity also persisted and, in part, due to a lack of accountability."
- Freedom of Expression, Including for the Press
  "Non-governmental Impact: atheist, and lesbian, gay, bisexual, transgender, and intersex (LGBTI) writers and bloggers reported they continued to receive death threats from violent extremist organizations. In November, a human rights lawyer claimed he received death threats for writing about and advocating for the country's LGBTI community."
- Acts of Violence, Discrimination, and Other Abuses Based on Sexual Orientation and Gender Identity
  "Consensual same-sex sexual activity is illegal under the law. LGBTI groups reported police used the law as a pretext to bully LGBTI individuals, as well as those considered effeminate regardless of their sexual orientation, and to limit registration of LGBTI organizations. Some groups also reported harassment under a suspicious behavior provision of the police code. The transgender population has long been a marginalized, but recognised part of society, but it faced continued high levels of fear, harassment, and law enforcement contact in the wake of violent extremist attacks against vulnerable communities.
  Members of LGBTI communities received threatening messages via telephone, text, and social media, and some were harassed by police.
  In May, RAB forces raided the Chayaneer Community Center in Keraniganj Upazila during a dinner organised by the LGBTI community from that area. According to witnesses, 28 individuals were arrested of the 120 persons present at the time of the raid. The witnesses also stated RAB separated the diners into small groups and beat them before identifying individuals for arrest. During the raid RAB announced to the media the raid was conducted based on suspicion of homosexual activity and allowed the media to photograph some of the arrested individuals. RAB later announced the attendees were not engaged in "illegal sexual activities" at the time of the raid and were instead arrested for possession of narcotics—specifically yaba (a combination of methamphetamine and caffeine) and cannabis. The court system remanded four of the individuals. Of the remaining 24 individuals, 12 were detained for further questioning and 12 were sent directly to jail.
  Following these events and continued harassment, many members of LGBTI communities, including the leadership of key support organizations, continued to reduce their activities and sought refuge both inside and outside of the country. This resulted in severely weakened advocacy and support networks for LGBTI persons. Organizations specifically assisting lesbians continued to be rare. Strong social stigma based on sexual orientation was common and prevented open discussion of the subject."
- HIV and AIDS Social Stigma
  "Social stigma against HIV and AIDS and against higher-risk populations could be a barrier for accessing health services, especially for the transgender community and men who have sex with men."
- Discrimination with Respect to Employment and Occupation
  "The labor law prohibits wage discrimination on the basis of sex or disability, but it does not prohibit other discrimination based on sex, disability, social status, caste, sexual orientation, or similar factors."

In 2022, Bangladesh expressed dissatisfaction at a United States human rights report stating that there had been arbitrary arrests of LGBTQ, saying that the tendency to impose their values on Bangladesh was regrettable, and that the arrests were not arbitrary as they would go to a court of law.

=== Incidents ===
==== Murder of Xulhaz Mannan ====
In April 2016, LGBTQ activist Xulhaz Mannan, founder and publisher of Roopbaan, the only magazine for the LGBTQ community in Bangladesh, was killed, along with Mahbub Rabbi Tonoy, another LGBTQ activist. Ansar-al-Islam, an Al-Qaeda-linked group, claimed responsibility for the murders stating as he had himself confirmed his sexuality, he needed to be killed according to shariah law. In May 2019, eight extremists were charged by Bangladesh police for the murders. Four of the eight are in custody and police are still searching for the others.

==== Expulsion of transgender people ====
In November 2023, Hochemin Islam, a transgender woman, faced exclusion from the North South University (NSU) women's carnival, as university authorities cited security concerns. Moreover, a group of students issued threats of unrest and pledged to boycott exams if her inclusion was pursued. Notably, during student rallies, there were banners explicitly expressing "no transgender" sentiments.

In March 2025, Mohammad Muntasir Rahman, a prominent LGBTQ activist in Bangladesh, was included as an initial member of the first 151-member committee that was released by the newly formed National Citizen Party (NCP); however, he was later expelled from the party after his LGBTQ activism and open life as a homosexual came to light. Sarjis Alam and Hasnat Abdullah, two of the most senior leaders in the NCP, gave statements supporting his expulsion, emphasising Bangladesh's identity as a Muslim-majority country.

In August 2025, Sahara Chowdhury, a final-year English student and a transgender woman at Metropolitan University in Sylhet, was expelled for life, stating that she had issued threats online and carried a weapon on campus, causing fear among students. Sahara denied the allegations and said that the expulsion followed her sharing a satirical caricature involving Asif Mahtab Utsha, who tore textbook alleging LGBTQ promotion in 2024, and Dr. Mohammad Sorowar Hossain. Earlier, both Asif Mahtab Utsha and Dr. Mohammad Sorowar Hossain, affiliated with far-right Islamist group Intifada Bangladesh, faced death threats from a far-left Gay militant Facebook ID which contained a post with caption of "Me and my homies playing football with Asif Mahtab Utsha's decapicted head". Sahara later appeared in a Netra News report covering queer rights in the country. She was also the subject of a controversy for authoring a book titled Bangladeshi Queer Manifesto, which called for violent actions against capitalists and conservatives in order to secure legal queer rights, subsequently on 10 October 2025 she performed a hunger and thirst strike demanding queer marriage rights which went on for two days before a rally of queer and queer allies were organized to publicly demand said rights in solidarity with her.

==== 2024 textbook tearing controversy ====
On 19 January 2024, Asif Mahtab Utsha, a part-time lecturer at BRAC University, publicly tore up the seventh-grade textbook History and Social Science, issued by the National Curriculum and Textbook Board (NCTB) as part of the new curriculum, in a seminar, claiming that the book promotes homosexual and transgender concepts. The controversy evolved around a textbook story titled Sharifar Golpo (The story of Sharifa), where the central character named Sharif, born male at birth but later identifies himself as a woman adopting the name "Sharifa", and subsequently chooses to live as a member of the Hijra community. In the seminar, titled New Textbook in Current Curriculum: Reality and Future, organized by the National Teachers Forum (affiliated with Islami Andolan Bangladesh, the second largest Islamist political party of Bangladesh), Asif Mahtab Utsha gave a speech during which, he ripped down the pages of the book, shouting, "This will be my protest. I will rip the two pages of Sharif–Sharifa with my own money".

On 21 January, Asif stated in a Facebook post that he has been asked not to come to his regular lectures from the following day. This led BRAC University to much criticism. On 24 January, a group of BRAC University students staged a protest against the authorities of the university, with banner-placards in their hands writing "Say No To LGBTQ", "We Don't Promote LGBTQ". They also called for class boycott and boycott of BRAC products. Later the BRAC University clarified his expulsion, claiming the "act of vandalism towards national property as unacceptable behaviour".

In response of this textbook controversy, Bangladeshi Minister of Education Mohibul Hasan Chowdhury declared for the scrutinization and amendment of the textbook if any inconsistency or ambiguity is found in the story, it would be amended. Later the Ministry of Education formed a five-member committee to review the chapter, mostly consisting the Islamic scholars and educationists. Four months later, the committee reported that nineteen words used in the story are "incompatible" with Bangladeshi society, thus they recommended the story to be omitted from the textbook.

== Developments ==
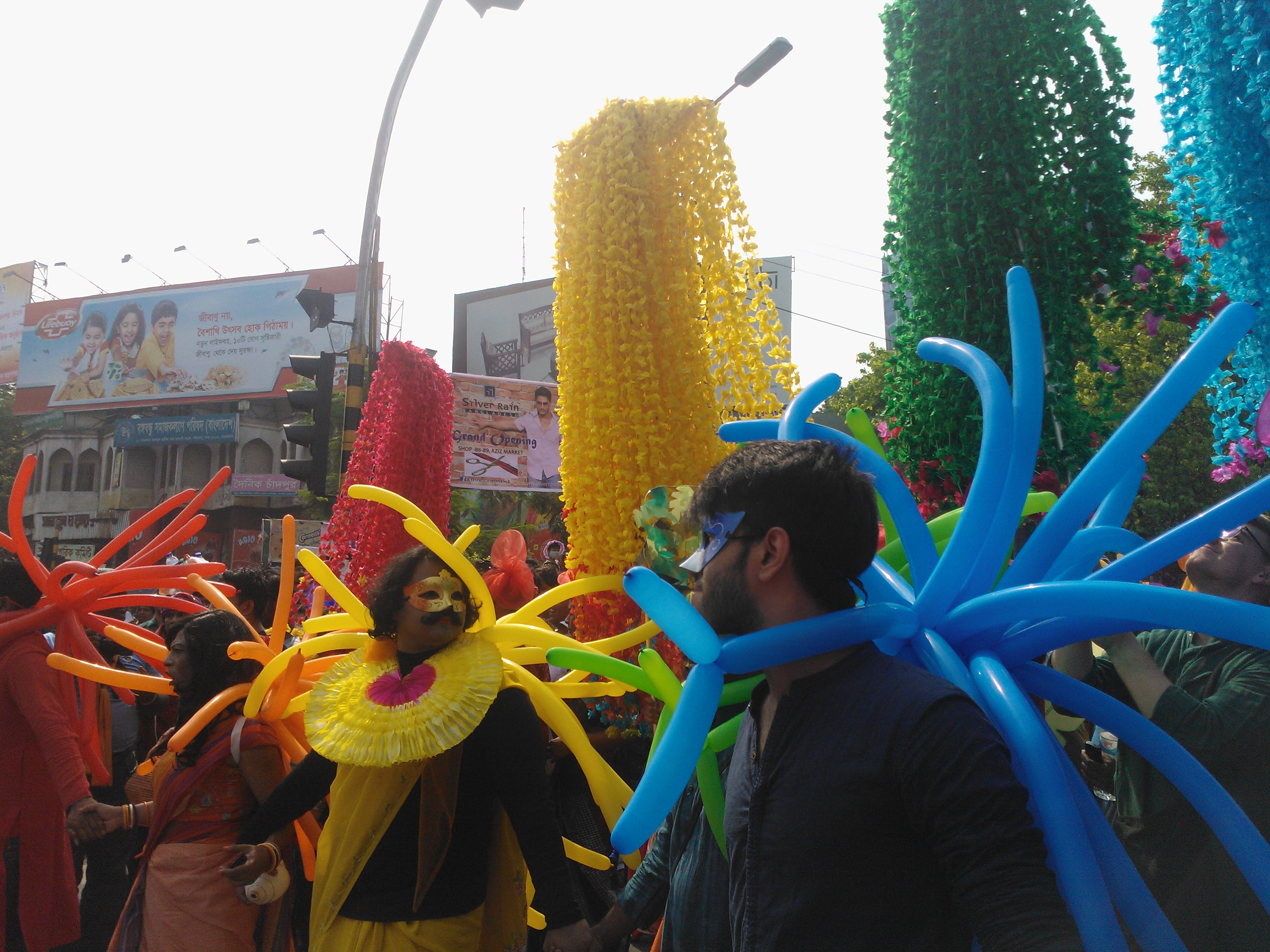
LGBT rights rally during the Bengali New Year's festival (2015) in Dhaka

In January 2014, Bangladesh's first LGBTQ magazine was published. The magazine is named Roopbaan after a Bengali folk character who represents the power of love. Since 2014, every year at the beginning of the Bengali new year on 14 April, a Pride event called Rainbow Rally had been organised in Dhaka. After threats, the 2016 event had to be cancelled. In 2014, Bangladesh held its first Hijra parade.

== Public perception ==
In the context of homosexuality, it is still taboo in Bangladesh and most people in society are not familiar with LGBTQ people and their rights. Most of the people consider same-sex sexual acts in the same way that "sodomy" was viewed in the British colonial era; they do not possess the general idea of same gender romance, are unaware of it, and only allow friendship between people of the same gender. Bangladeshi literature has a rich community of writers but the authors have never promoted homosexuality. However, some scholars have argued that the uncertainty within which the LGBTQ population exists in Bangladesh is not merely a symptom of rising intolerance or fundamentalism, and rather should be situated within a broader framework that accounts for an authoritarian state, the country's historically ambivalent relation to religion, and the nation's structurally marginal geopolitical location.

Although public display of affection between friends of the same gender in Bangladesh is commonly approved and does not raise any controversies, there appears to be a strong objection towards homosexuality. This hostile attitude results from the conservative culture of the country inherited from its colonial past, and exacerbated by mainstream schools of Islam condemning homosexuality (see LGBTQ people and Islam). Society's miscreants can involve in mob justice as they also consider homosexuality 'immoral' and 'abnormal' and also a social crime.

In 2003, Dr. Gary Dowsett, an Australian professor, published a report titled A Review of Knowledge About the Sexual Networks and Behaviours of Men Who Have Sex with Men in Asia as part of a study on how the AIDS pandemic is impacting the nation. The bulk of the report focused on male prostitution, but it did generate some public discussion about LGBTQ issues, with Indian movies and water poisoning through arsenic being blamed for making homosexuality more common. In reply, some people criticized these negative viewpoints as being unsound scientifically and based on prejudice.

The UN Population Fund and several NGOs have put pressure on Bangladesh to address issues such as LGBTQ rights and sexuality education. These issues were discussed at the Sixth Asian and Pacific Population Conference which began on 16 September 2013. Bangladesh altogether opposed the UNFPA's idea to support LGBTQ rights. Bangladesh's permanent representative to the UN, Abulkalam Abdul Momen, said that adopting such policies would go against the country's social norms.

In 2011, a research-based engagement with a school of public health at a university in Bangladesh had aimed to raise public debate on sexuality and rights in a very sensitive political context. By bringing together stakeholders, including members of sexual minorities, academicians, service providers, media, policy makers and advocacy organizations, the research engagement worked to bring visibility to hidden and stigmatized sexuality and rights issues. Critical steps towards visibility for sexual minorities include creating safe spaces for meeting, developing learning materials for university students and engaging with legal rights groups.

In September 2014, at the International Conference on Population Development, Bangladesh refused the idea of providing rights to the LGBTQ community. Abdul Momen made similar comments in regards to the situation as he did the previous year at the Sixth Asian and Pacific Population Conference. He was quoted saying that, like other Muslim or even Christian countries, Bangladesh does not support LGBTQ rights because it does not represent their values.

=== Public opinion ===
A 2017-2020 World Values Survey showed that 77.3% of Bangladeshis would not accept a homosexual neighbour, compared to 19.5% that would. The same survey found that 89.4% of Bangladeshis said homosexuality was unjustifiable, compared to just 10.6% who said it was. The same survey also found that 75.4% of Bangladeshis disagreed with the statement "homosexual couples are as good parents as other couples", while 6.5% agreed.

A 2013 Gallup poll showed that 28% of Bangladeshis thought that the area they lived in was not a good place for homosexuals, while 19% thought it was.

== Bangladeshi LGBTQ organisations ==
Boys of Bangladesh is a popular online forum for gay men

The first attempt to create an LGBTQ organisation in Bangladesh came in 1999, when a man called Rengyu, described as a "middle-aged foreign-educated guy from an indigenous tribe", opened the first online group for Bangladeshi gay people, called Gay Bangladesh, which was moderated by a man named Abrar. It drew over 1,000 members; however, after Rengyu's death, its activity slowed down and the group itself became neglected. In 2002, two other online groups appeared on the Yahoo! portal: Teen Gay Bangladesh (TGB) operated by Abrar, and Boys Only Bangladesh. Both groups were deleted by Yahoo! authorities in December 2002, and after several restarts and name changes, TGB formed under new name Bangladesh Gay Boys (BGB) and Boys Only Bangladesh, now called Boys of Bangladesh (BoB). The group is the largest network for Bangladeshi gay men, organizing numerous LGBTQ rights-related events in Dhaka since 2009. Boys of Bangladesh aims at building a gay community in the country and repealing Section 377.

Many people have turned to Boys of Bangladesh to discuss their feelings and connect with similar individuals who face the same problems they do. The forum has not registered as an organisation because they do not want to associate themselves with the MSM (men who have sex with men) label. They do not wish to fall under the umbrella of being MSMs because they view it as a degrading term. The group's coordinator has stated that the MSM label is only about men having sex with other men. It is considered more than that. The online forum arranges events for gay men to meet and socialise. Not all people have access to their group because they do not have access to the internet. Nonetheless, BoB has more than 2,000 registered members, including Ph.D. holders and doctors.

== Summary table ==
LGBT rights in Bangladesh
| Same-sex sexual activity legal | (Penalty: Up to life imprisonment with fines) |
| Equal age of consent | |
| Anti-discrimination laws in employment | (Neither sexual orientation nor gender identity is a protected class from employment discrimination) |
| Anti-discrimination laws in the provision of goods and services | |
| Anti-discrimination laws in all other areas (incl. indirect discrimination, hate speech) | |
| Same-sex marriage | |
| Recognition of same-sex couples | |
| Stepchild adoption by same-sex couples | |
| Joint adoption by same-sex couples | |
| Lesbians, gays and bisexuals allowed to serve openly in the military | |
| Right to change legal gender | |
| Recognition of a third gender | Yes (Hijra only) |
| Access to IVF for lesbians | |
| Commercial surrogacy for gay male couples | (Illegal for all couples regardless of sexual orientation) |
| MSMs allowed to donate blood | |

== See also ==
- Human rights in Bangladesh
- LGBTQ rights in Asia
- LGBTQ history in Bangladesh
- Sexuality in Bangladesh
- Nazrul Islam Ritu
- Tashnuva Anan Shishir
- Dakshin Char Kalibari Masjid
