= Roopbaan =

Bangladeshi LGBT magazine

- Categories: LGBT
- Founded: 2014
- First issue: January 2014
- Final issue Number: August 2014; Vol. 2 No. 1
- Country: Bangladesh
- Language: Bengali
- Website: www.roopbaan.orgwww.roopbaan-sylhet.org

Roopbaan (Bengali: রূপবান), founded in 2014, was a Bengali language LGBT-focused magazine in Bangladesh, the first of its kind. It also organizes projects and events, runs a website, and describes itself as a "non-profit, non-political, volunteer-based platform for LGBT individuals and their allies." Roopbaan's print magazine and public events were disrupted when co-founder and publisher Xulhaaz Mannan was murdered in 2016, though the last issue of this magazine was published in August 2014.

Bangladeshi researcher and writer Hadi Hussain described the public impact of Roopbaan in Gaylaxy magazine:

"When Roopbaan was launched back in 2014 ... the most striking thing for me was the fact that it was a Bengali language magazine printed into hard copies. The message was clear – instead of limiting it to a virtual English-centric socially privileged group, the magazine aimed to reach the average Bengali speaking literate person with a message of diversity, tolerance and acceptance. It was no less than a heroic attempt to do so as it not only increases the visibility but also one's vulnerability, especially in a society where state's inability to control Islamist militant groups had already created a dangerous nexus for local human rights defenders. But all this couldn't deter…[Roopban]…from doing their work as they continued to arrange social support group meetings, workshops, talks, trainings and rainbow rally to claim the space denied to individuals who don't subscribe their lives and identities to the hetero-normative rules of the world."

== Name ==
Roopbaan says its name means "fabulous and beautiful person." According to The Dhaka Tribune, the magazine is named after "the Bengali folk character Roopbaan symbolising the power of love." AFP describes "Roopbaan" as "the name of a Bengali fairytale of a beautiful young girl married to a boy".

== Print magazine ==
The magazine published its 56-page first issue in January 2014. There were 600 copies printed, with copies priced at Tk100. According to The Dhaka Tribune, Roopbaan was "taking submissions from volunteer contributors. It includes articles, photography and personal accounts of the volunteers." The launch garnered both local and international coverage. The first issue's cover featured an image of a man tied up, with the words Valobashte dao more (Let me love). According to scholar Adnan Hossain, this was a metaphor for gay men in Bangladeshi society.

The second issue was published in August 2014; after this no new issue was published. There were 700 copies printed, with copies priced at Tk150.

It has a local publication name, The Sylhet Roopbaan Review, based in Sylhet city, which regularly publishes stories of the LGBTQ community and covers the life stories of Bengali LGBTQ+ activists Xulhaz, Hifjur Jamil, Rabbi, Mazharul, etc."

According to Raad Rahman in The Guardian, co-founder and publisher Xulhaaz Mannan announced that "Roopbaan's printers had received warnings against printing the magazine but assured us that keeping a low profile would ensure the magazine’s survival…[but] the printers would cancel their contract with Roopbaan within a week, after receiving death threats if collaborations continued." Rahman quotes an anonymous source who writes "Roopbaan was discussed in a government cabinet meeting and the magazine was placed in front of the prime minister…She was obviously not happy to see it. Then...the local newspapers stated that the government intelligence is looking for us."

Mannan was murdered by Islamist extremists in 2016, putting an end to the print magazine.

== Book ==
Roopbaan published Roopongti, a book of Bengali queer poetry, in February 2015.

== Projects and events ==
Roopbaan also organized regular projects and events:

- In 2014, Roopbaan worked with Boys of Bangladesh to conduct a national survey of lesbian, gay, and bisexual Bangladeshis.
- Between 2014 and 2015, it organized Pink Slip, a sexual health and safety outreach program.
- In 2015 and 2016, it organized a youth leadership program in Dhaka.
- It organized "Rainbow Rally" pride parades in 2014 and 2015 as part of Pohela Boishakh celebrations. The rally was cancelled in 2016 when local police denied a permit for the rally citing security concerns: after rising death threats toward the parade organizers, there were credible threats of extremist action that year. Some men tried to begin an unofficial rally that year on April 14, but they were arrested.
- In 2014 and 2015, it organized a drag show and a transgender/transvestite fashion show.
- From 2013 to 2015, it ran an annual Ramadan iftar, which it described as "LGBTQ-inclusive."

== Legacy ==
Roopbaan was created to publicly declare the existence of somopremi (same-sex loving) people in Bangladesh. It was the first Bangladeshi gay magazine published in Bengali, and it also became an influential advocacy group for LGBTQ people in Bangladesh. It increased the range of LGBTQ support groups from online to offline and from cities to rural areas.

After receiving publicity in Bangladesh, Roopbaan was often considered to be a piece of foreign propaganda. LGBTQ pride and activism were seen as alien to Bangladesh, instead a result of Western societies and their own morals. Mannan, one of the magazine's co-founders, had connections to the US Agency for International Development and the local US embassy, which increased public suspicion toward the magazine.

Xulhaz Mannan and Mahbub Rabbi Tonoy, who both worked at Roopbaan, were murdered on April 25, 2016. When the press in Bangladesh covered their murders, it became the first time that Bengali media openly referenced homosexuality and LGBTQ activism. However, the murders did not prompt much solidarity across society or other rights organizations. Many LGBTQ people felt unsafe and stayed closeted, and some prominent LGBTQ rights activists and scholars left the country.

== See also ==
- LGBT rights in Bangladesh
- Xulhaz Mannan
- Attacks by Islamic extremists in Bangladesh
