= Xulhaz Mannan =

LGBTQ-rights activist from Bangladesh

- Born: 12 October 1976
- Died: 25 April 2016 (aged 39); Dhaka, Bangladesh
- Known for: LGBTQ activism in Bangladesh

Xulhaz Mannan (Bengali: জুলহাজ মান্নান, pronounced [dʒulɦaz manːan]; 12 October 1976 – 25 April 2016) was an LGBTQ+ rights activist, USAID employee, and the founder of Bangladesh's first and only LGBTQ-themed magazine Roopbaan (Bengali: রূপবান). He was murdered, along with his partner and fellow-activist Mahbub Rabbi Tonoy, in a 2016 machete attack by Ansar al-Islam, the Bangladeshi branch of Al-Qaeda.

== Early life and education ==
Mannan was born on 12 October 1976. His mother, Sakhina Khatun, is a retired education ministry officer, and his father, who died several years ago, was actively involved in the 1971 Bangladeshi independence movement. His elder brother, Minhaj Mannan Emon, is the managing director of BLE Securities and shareholder-director of Dhaka Stock Exchange. His elder sister is a pharmacist, and lives in the United States. Former Bangladeshi Minister of Foreign Affairs Dipu Moni was his first cousin.

Mannan completed his SSC and HSC (1993) at Dhaka Residential Model College. He studied commerce at Dhaka City College, and international relations at Dhaka University. In 2003, he graduated with a post-graduate degree in peace and conflict studies.

== Career ==
Mannan worked at MGH Group, and later joined the Embassy of the United States, Dhaka in 2007 as a Protocol Specialist. He started working at the now-defunct US Agency for International Development (USAID) in 2015.

== Activism ==
In 2006, Mannan worked with Kasia Paprocki, associate professor in the Department of Geography and Environment at the London School of Economics and Political Science, on a project supporting former garment workers in the development of workers' cooperatives. The garment workers were living in a slum on the east side of Dhaka. Paprocki remembers being "moved by the tenderness with which [Mannan] spoke to the women" during field research, noting their concerns and assessing what could be done to help them organize. "Whereas many fieldworkers of non-governmental organisations (often upper middle class urbanites), who work with poorer communities, such as farmers and slum-dwellers, sometimes cultivate an air of condescension with members of communities such as these, Xulhaz always came with a kind and open heart," Paprocki said.

According to writer and journalist Raad Rahman, Mannan "fostered a powerful vision about how there is nothing un-Bengali about being gay, nothing unnatural about advocating for gay rights". Rahman met Mannan through a college friend in 2012, after moving back to Bangladesh. At the time, Mannan was working to promote HIV testing and awareness in the country, and spoke to Rahman about "publishing what became Bangladesh's first and only LGBT magazine, Roopbaan."

=== Publication of Roopbaan ===
In 2014, Mannan launched Roopbaan, the only magazine for the LGBT community in Bangladesh, with Tonoy and Rafida Bonya Ahmed, a gay Bangladeshi writer, visual artist and community organizer. The 56-page magazine is named after a Bangadeshi folklore character. "Many years ago in Nirashbu, which is the fictional kingdom in the story, there was a young girl named Roopbaan," Rafida explained in an interview with an American non-profit Freedom From Religion Foundation. "When she turned 12, she was forced to marry a 12-day-old prince...and leave the kingdom, so she was practically exiled to a jungle for 12 years. The reason behind that was to save the life of Roopbaan's infant husband." Rafida said that the reason people celebrated the 800-year old folklore was because it has evolved to "served as a kind of erotica or fantasy for heterosexual men." The magazine was an attempt to reclaim "his very heterosexist, flawed and problematic story" and retell it "from a queer perspective, shifting the focus from heterosexism to feminism." Mannan and Rafida "came up with [their own] twist" while working on Roopbaan in 2013. "What we wanted to tell them is that it's essentially a story of a woman and her 12 years of struggle to do pushback—to push back sexism, to push back unwanted sexual moves, to push back repression. Eventually, it's a story of the triumph of love over social stigma and oppression," Rafida recalled.

The grand launch of Roopbaan "was attended by more than 130 allies and community members" in Dhaka, and the invitation-only event was covered by "more than 300 local and international media outlets." Rafida told AFP that the quarterly magazine will not be available on street newsstands, "for fear of inflaming tensions and sparking a backlash against the gay community". Roopbaan received tremendous attention after the launch; numerous op-eds, blogs, research articles, and social media discussions followed with, and LGBTQ+ issues in Bangladesh became "a major debate in spaces like offices, colleges, universities, and homes." In a press conference, Bangladesh Tafsir Parishad, a Sufi political party, called the magazine a "master plan of the evil West," calling for an immediate ban on Roopbaan and the arrest of all editors involved. Islamist extremist pages on social media, including Basher Kella, Salauddiner Ghora and Hizbut-Tahrir, issued open threats in response to the launch event. Some of them posted pictures of the LGBTQ activists calling for their murder. Roopbaan editors were "advised to remain home for couple of weeks."

The original plan to publish Roopbaan every three months was foiled as printers refused to engage with the editors due to the constant threats of violence. The second edition was released in August 2014. Out of the 700 printed versions, close to half were sent outside of Dhaka to people with "poor access to the internet and social media". The team received orders from as far away as New Zealand and the United States.

A blogger who worked with Mannan on the magazine at the time said that they expected the publication of the second edition to "be lot less complicated than the first" but instead they encountered hurdles at every step. "The printing press, which printed the first edition of Roopbaan magazine, told us the next day that they were unable to print the magazine in the future," he wrote, "I was literally heartbroken. Not that Roopbaan wouldn't be printed, but out of fear of the police. Hearing my doorbell, I would cringe in fear." According to him, Mannan stood by his editors during these "trying times," advising them to not "make any trouble if police come looking" for them. "Don't deny anything. Go to the police station with them. Tell them my name. Tell them that Xulhaz is the kingpin of this magazine," Mannan said.

Rahman, writing for The Guardian, confirmed that within the first week of Roopbaan's inaugural publication, the printers received death threats "if collaborations continued." Mannan, "adamant that Roopbaan's goal was to be a literary venture within a largely marginalised community," refused all interview requests from international media and assured his team that "keeping a low profile would ensure the magazine's survival." Roopbaan became the centre of discussion at a government cabinet meeting. The magazine was placed in front of the prime minister who was "obviously not happy to see it." A few days later, Bangladeshi newspaper Bhorer Kagoz reported that government intelligence was looking for the editors.

=== Roopbaan Rainbow Rally ===
In 2014, Roopbaan organised the Rainbow Rally on Pahela Baishakh, the first day of Bangla calendar, as a celebration of "diversity, friendship, and love," allowing the Bangladeshi LGBTQ+ community to walk in a public space for the first time "without hiding their sexual orientation and gender identity." Like many former British colonies, Bangladesh criminalizes homosexuality under Section 377 of its constitution. The rally, meant to be a "silent protest" against the lack of government recognition of homosexuality, became an annual tradition for the Bangladeshi LGBTQ+ community. Roopbaan continued to receive threats before and after the rally, as the event gained international attention after local Bangladeshi media compared it to a pride parade. The 2015 rally was much larger, with more allies joining, and received significant media coverage.

In 2016, the Bangladeshi government prohibited the use of masks and other face coverings, which greatly affected the planning of the rally that year as most attendees preferred to remain anonymous. In addition, the onslaught of threats continued. A Facebook page titled 'Voice of Bangladesh' created an event with a call to beat the attendees if the rally were to happen. On 13 April 2016, the Dhaka Metropolitan Police and Dhaka University jointly denied permission for the rally over permit issues and fear of religious backlash. When a few members of the LGBTQ+ community showed up for the rally anyway, they were arrested. Mannan and Tonoy stayed with them at the police station until after midnight when they were released on bail. The police outed the detainees to their parents, and released their names to the press. Tonoy received death threats two days later through a phone call. His family also confirmed that a group of unknown individuals visited Tonoy's residence and threatened him to "stay away from homosexual activities." Executive officials belonging to "a prominent sexual health service provider and a human rights defender" of Boys of Bangladesh (BoB), an informal group of closeted Bangladeshi gay men, were interrogated by the police about their connections with Roopbaan."

=== Other Roopbaan LGBTQ+ initiatives ===
Roopbaan organized several other community-engagement and advocacy events between 2013 and 2015, including Pink Slip, SNS Transition Show and LGBT Film Festival. Pink Slip focused on raising awareness about sexual health and safety. Under the initiative, Roopbaan partnered with local hospitals to set up 2-day health camps, offering gay men a safe space to test for sexually transmitted infections (STIs) and sexually transmitted diseases (STDs). In December 2014, Roopbaan and BoB published a needs assessment report on the challenges faced by LGBTQ+ people in Bangladesh. The report, based on a community survey of 571 self-identified LGBTQ+ respondents, uncovered the different forms of harassment, including blackmail, physical assault, and sexual violence, people faced in their daily lives due to their sexual orientation. The report also found that members of the Bangladeshi LGBTQ+ community had no legal recourse to protect themselves, as a vast majority of the perpetrators of discrimination were friends and classmates. Roopbaan also conducted a Youth Leadership Program for LGBTQ+ people aged 16-24 years, comprising two-day workshops, seminars, and activities on issues affecting the lives of the target group.

In February 2015, Roopbaan announced the publication of a queer poetry book Roopongti at the Ekushey, the largest book fair in Bangladesh. The publisher of Roopongti was attacked in September 2015. In 2019, the magazine published Iti Roopbaan, a collection of letters from the Bangladeshi LGBTQ+ community.

== Murder ==
In the days leading up to the murder, Mannan had been receiving threatening phone calls. At the same time, an Islamist Facebook page entitled "Voice of Bangladesh" had issued direct threats to gay rights activists. A woman's rights campaigner told The Telegraph that Mannan had expressed concerns about his safety and that of his fellow-activists. "At one point Xulhaz made a joke that one of these days you will find me with my throat cut," she said. After law enforcement officials detained attendees of the 2016 rainbow rally, Mannan and others, expecting further harassment, were "reluctant" to approach the police about the death threats.

On 25 April 2016 around 5:00 PM, a group of five to seven men entered Mannan's first-floor Kalabagan apartment carrying machetes and murdered him along with his friend Mahbub Rabbi Tonoy. Tonoy was an LGBTQ-rights activist, and worked as a dramatist for Lok Natto-dal, an association of local playwrights. The assailants identified themselves as couriers delivering a parcel. Parvez Molla, one of the building's security guards, followed them up to Mannan's apartment where he lived with his 75-year-old mother, Sakhina Khatun. "Xulhaz opened the door when they knocked. He tried to shut the door once he saw them. But they tried to enter by force," Molla said. "I told them to go since [he] didn't let them in. Suddenly, they attacked me." As Molla fell down, the assailants forced themselves into the apartment and attacked Mannan and Tonoy. Sakhina, who was sleeping at the time of the attack, rushed to the living room after hearing commotion. When she tried to intervene, the assailants threw a chair at her and injured her leg. Molla, who sustained "a sharp weapon injury on the left side of his forehead" was later admitted to Dhaka Medical College Hospital (DMCH) by another security guard Sumon.

Residents of the building said that "nobody could muster the courage to step forward even after hearing [the two men] cry out." A woman said she saw the assailants leaving the apartment. "Some others chased them. They fled shouting Allahu Akbar ("Allah is Great") through the Tentultala playground," she said. She also noticed that at least four of the assailants were carrying guns, and fired several rounds after coming out of the building.

According to Mohammad Iqbal, the officer in charge at the local police station, the parcel contained the machetes used to carry out the killings. "The assailants, armed with guns, escaped the building through a narrow alley, opening fire on a policeman when he tried to stop them," Iqbal said. Shibli Noman, Assistant Commissioner of Dhaka Metropolitan Police later confirmed that the assailants also stabbed an assistant sub-inspector (ASI), Momtaz, on their way out.

== Aftermath ==
=== Al-Qaeda involvement ===
Ansar al-Islam, the Bangladeshi branch of Al-Qaeda, claimed responsibility for the murders the next day. In a statement released to the public, Mufti Abdullah Ashraf, spokesperson of the organization, claimed that the two men were "assassinated" for "spearheading the campaign to publicly spread the filth of homosexuality in Bangladesh." Ashraf criticised their LGBTQ activism, calling Mannan a "degenerate pervert and promoter of perversion" who used Roopbaan "to spread and popularise homosexuality" in the country. He also alleged that the 2015 Youth Leadership Program Mannan organised, with support from an Indian non-profit CREA, "laid out different schemes and methodologies to attract the unsuspecting youth to homosexuality." In a tweet shared the same day, Ansar-al Islam said that Mannan and Tonoy were "pioneers of practicing and promoting homosexuality in Bangladesh" and were "working day and night to promote homosexuality among the people of this land since 1998 with the help of their masters, the US crusaders and its Indian allies."

Ansar-al Islam's statement came to light hours after the then Bangladesh Prime Minister Sheikh Hasina blamed the murders on the opposition nexus of Bangladesh National Party and Bangladesh Jamaat-e-Islami. At a party meeting in Gonobhaban, Hasina's press secretary Ihsanul Karim said, "[The opposition] has been burning people dead and committing other terrorist acts to destabilize the country from the time of the last general election."

=== Reactions to the murders ===
USAID published a statement condemning the attack, calling Mannan "a dedicated and courageous advocate for human rights". The United States Department of State told Reuters, "We are outraged by the barbaric attack on Mr. Xulhaz Mannan, a beloved member of our embassy family and a courageous advocate for LGBTI rights." In a White House press release, the United States National Security Council spokesperson Ned Price condemned the "brutal murders" and said that Mannan "set an example of dignity, courage, and selflessness, and his legacy will live on in the causes he championed." U.S. Secretary of State John Kerry phoned prime minister Sheikh Hasina advocating for the arrest of Mannan's murderers.

United States ambassador to Bangladesh Marcia Stephens Bloom Bernicat condemned the "senseless act of violence" and urged the Bangladesh government "to apprehend the criminals behind these murders". In a Facebook post, Bernicat wrote that Mannan was "more than a colleague to those of us fortunate to work with him at the U.S. Embassy."

=== Implications for the LGBTQ+ community in Bangladesh ===
A member of Roopbaan said that following the murders, most Bangladeshi LGBTQ+ activists went into hiding for survival. They stopped communicating through social media, switched off their phones, and moved out of their usual accommodations. Some of the "high-profile" activists confined themselves to two safe houses, and avoided opening or being seen near the windows. One such activist admitted to changing their location eight times over the next twelve months, seeking shelter in "creepy" hotels, deserted apartments, and mutual friends' homes. "To me, the definition of home and homeland has changed much over the past 12 months–I have started feeling as though I don't have a home anymore," they said. Another one said: "Even though I am free [not under arrest], I am so scared. I haven't even gone back to my house."

More than two dozen LGBTQ+ activists and human rights defenders left Bangladesh "never to return." Those who stayed grappled with "self-censorship" as they were advised to remove online evidence of their activism and forgo social media platforms that could expose their location. Many of them suffered from depression, and became isolated even from the queer community due to the prevailing fear that extremists might target anyone found associating with activists whose identities had been revealed. Owing to all these factors, organising around LGBTQ+ issues became non-existent, with only one openly operational NGO primarily serving the hijra (third-gender) community.

=== Investigation and arrests ===
Mannan's brother, Minhaz Mannan Emo, filed a case against the unidentified assailants after the murders. A separate case related to the attack on the policeman and the firearms confiscated, was also filed.

On 12 May 2019, more than three years after the attack, Counter Terrorism and Transnational Crime (CTTC) unit of Dhaka Metropolitan Police charged eight men for the double murder. CTTC inspector Mohammad Moniruzzaman, who led the investigation, turned in the charge sheet to the Dhaka Metropolitan Magistrate Court (DMMC). The court's General Recording Officer (GRO) sub-inspector Sharif Shafayet confirmed that Dhaka Metropolitan Magistrate Saiduzzaman Sharif had accepted the chargesheet.

Four of the accused confessed to their involvement under Section 164, sharing more information about the attack and identifying other assailants. The charge confirmed that Syed Ziaul Haque, chief of Ansar-al-Islam's military wing, had ordered the murders of Mannan and Tonoy. Haque was a former major in the Bangladeshi Army, who was fired after his involvement in a 2012 attempted coup.

=== Court proceedings and convictions ===
The trial against eight accused, including Haque, began on 19 November 2019. Public prosecutor Golam Sarwar Khan, representing the state, produced 24 witnesses before the court. ABM Khairul Islam Liton and Nazrul Islam represented the accused.

Case records show that Haque was the mastermind behind the murders. One of the other accused Mozammel Hossain had received a death penalty for the 2015 murder of Avijit Roy, a Bangladeshi-American engineer, activist, and founder of the Mukto-Mona, an Internet blogging community for Bangladeshi freethinkers. In his confession, Mozammel mentioned that Haque told him about the rising LGBTQ activism in the country, and the Rainbow Rally Mannan was planning for April 2016. "Action had to be taken against them," Mozammel said. Arafat Rahman, who was also convicted and sentenced to death for his involvement in Avijit's murder, had scouted Mannan's residence prior to the killings.

Later, Mohammed Sheikh Abdullah Zobayer created a Facebook profile pretending to be a gay man under the name of Jayesh Bin Irfan. He began communicating with Bangladeshi LGBTQ people on the platform, and came to know about the Rainbow Rally. He informed Haque about the same, who then told Mozammel to send people disguised as couriers to Mannan's apartment. Mozammel created three counterfeit IDs two days before ambushing Mannan and Tonoy with machetes.

On the day of the attack, Mozammel and Zobayer, along with another accused Akram Hossain, positioned themselves in front of Mannan's residence. Mannan returned to his apartment from work at 5:00 PM, and Tonoy joined him 15 minutes later. Five assailants were also positioned at Tonoy's residence earlier. Around 5:30pm, three assailants, Akil, Afnan and Quamrul, entered Mannan's building and identified themselves as couriers. Zobayer and Haider waited outside near the building entrance. After killing Mannan and Tonoy, Akil opened blank fire while escaping from the building with the other assailants. Akil also stabbed an ASI with a knife after Haider was caught.

On 31 August 2021, the court of anti-terrorism special tribunal judge Mohammed Mojibur Rahman announced the verdict, convicting Haque, Akram, Mozammel, Rahman and Asadullah, and sentencing them to death for the murder of Mannan and Tonoy.

Two of the eight accused, Sabbirul Haque Chowdhury and Mohammed Junaid Ahmed, were acquitted of all charges and remain at large. Among the convicted, Haque and Akram are still absconding.

=== Reactions to the verdict ===
Mannan's brother told Al Jazeera that he was happy "law enforcers have been able to find my brother's killers." He said, "Though we are not going to get Xulhaz [Mannan] back, it's a consolation for us that the killers have been handed the maximum punishment." The public prosecutor in the case said that he believes "justice for Xulhaz and Tonoy is served," and the verdict is "a strong message for the militant group who are operational in Bangladesh." CTTC, while announcing the convictions, said, "They decided to slay the victims for their involvement in gay rights' activism. "All the convicts had the same intention. They wanted to prevent them from practicing their freedom and create fear among the other people from expressing their opinion." Taposhi, the executive director of the Bangladeshi queer organisation Shweekriti, said that "the verdict does nothing to protect others [like Mannan and Tonoy]" and called for the government to do more for the Vangladeshi LGBTQ+ community. "When a verdict is declared, other things come to surface as well. For instance, what kind of protection should our community be given? What is the government thinking about that? Will the law give any guidance to the police? Nothing came up," she added. She echoed the sentiments expressed in Roopbaan's post-verdict statement that said that religious extremists weren't the "only agents of queerphobia in Bangladesh" and the government "enables queerphobia through existing laws and policing practices."

== Legacy ==
In 2016, Hampton Roads Pride dedicated one of their scholarships to Mannan to demonstrate "solidarity with brothers/sisters in Islamic and Asian countries where LGBT folks are being killed for being who they are." Charles Ford, co-chairman of the Scholarship Committee, said the scholarship was "an appropriate recognition of a martyr in the struggle for equality before the law."

Starting 2018, USAID honors a staff member "who shares Mannan's spirit of inclusion the USAID programs" through the Mannan Inclusive Development Award. Mannan was also added to the USAID memorial wall at the agency headquarters in downtown Washington, DC. The wall, comprising engraved tiles with the names of 99 USAID fallen contractors around the world, was removed in 2025 after the Trump administration dismantled USAID.

In 2021, Inclusive Bangladesh, a non-profit and transgender-led youth LGBTIQ+ human rights organisation, announced the Xulhaz Mannan Memorial Award of Diversity to honor Mannan's legacy and recognise local LBGTQ+ activists. In the same year, Association of LGBTI Journalists (France) announced the Xulhaz Mannan Award under the Foreign Press category of their annual Out d'Or Prize. The Award is given to journalists for their outstanding contribution to the visibility of LGBT people in their country of origin or elsewhere.

On the 5-year anniversary the killings USAID issued a statement remembering Mannan and demanding that his murderers be brought to justice. At the same time, the United States Secretary of State Antony Blinken issued a statement remembering Mannan's 9 years at the embassy before joining USAID.

== See also ==
- Attacks by Islamic extremists in Bangladesh
- Islam and homosexuality
- Violence against LGBT people
