= Bandhu Social Welfare Society =

Human rights organization in Bangladesh

- বন্ধু সোশ্যাল ওয়েলফেয়ার সোসাইটি
- Abbreviation: BSWS
- Formation: 1996
- Founder: Shale Ahmed
- Type: Non-governmental organization
- Headquarters: Dhaka
- Location: Bangladesh
- Region served: Bangladesh
- Executive Director: Shale Ahmed
- Affiliations: UNICEF, National Human Rights Commission of Bangladesh
- Award: Hero Award (2017)

Bandhu Social Welfare Society (BSWS), commonly referred to as Bandhu (Bengali for "friend"), is a community-led, non-governmental organization (NGO) based in Dhaka, Bangladesh founded to advance the health, human rights, and livelihoods of sexual and gender minorities. Founded in 1996 by activist Shale Ahmed, the organization advocates for an inclusive society by providing vital sexual health services, rights advocacy, and safe spaces for men who have sex with men (MSM) and the transgender (hijra) community. Operating 37 field health centers nationwide and partnering with major institutions like UNICEF and the National Human Rights Commission.

== Description ==
Bandhu began its operations in 1996. The organization originated from 1996 to 1997 research on the health needs of men who have sex with men(MSM) in Dhaka. Then, it was formally registered with the Ministry of Social Welfare and the NGO Affairs Bureau in July 1997. The organization focused on inclusive Bangladesh, where everyone has equal access to healthcare and human rights, by supporting marginalized men and their partners through sexual health services, rights advocacy, and livelihood development. It operates 37 field health centers in Bangladesh.

== Works ==
They are running an initiative in which they established the youth center as a space for LGBTQ people to discuss and share their views and feelings. UNICEF Bangladesh funded the initiative. They are working with the National Human Rights Commission of Bangladesh on drafting a Hijra Protection Act to increase allowances for hijra people.

== Structure ==
It was founded by Shale Ahmed, a queer activist from Bangladesh, with his colleague, and he currently holds the position of executive director. He got an International Ashoka Fellowship from Ashoka in 2009 for his contribution to improving the sexual and reproductive health of MSM, transgender people, and their rights in Bangladesh.

== Award ==
The organization received a hero award in Thailand in 2017 for the best organization category.

== Protest ==
A mob led by former Brac University teacher Asif Mahtab Utsha surrounded the Bandhu Social Welfare Society headquarters in Dhaka, trapping staff inside until police intervened. Mahtab is a lecturer who was previously fired for tearing pages from a 7th-grade textbook, which incited the protest online by accusing the NGO of lobbying to include "Sharifa's Story," an educational chapter about the hijra community in the national curriculum. Bandhu filed a police report and was forced to shut down its website and social media accounts temporarily.
