= Boys of Bangladesh =

Organization

- Logo of Boys of Bangladesh
- Abbreviation: BoB
- Formation: 2 November 2002; 24 years ago
- Type: NGO
- Purpose: Gender equality and for normalization of sexual orientation in Bangladesh.
- Headquarters: Dhaka, Bangladesh
- Region served: Bangladesh
- Official language: English, Bengali
- Website: www.boysofbangladesh.orgwww.bobsylhet.org

Boys of Bangladesh, popularly abbreviated BoB, formerly known as Boys Only Bangladesh, is one of the oldest running online Yahoo Group of closeted Bangladeshi gay men. Based in Dhaka, this non-registered, non-funded and non-formal group was run by a pool of volunteers. Boys of Bangladesh operated since 2002 solely through a Yahoo! Group as the primary dating site for Bangladeshi gay men before the advent of Grindr. In addition to online activities, BoB arranged social get-togethers such as parties. Boys of Bangladesh was an apolitical group and had no intentions of repealing Penal Code 377.

== History ==
BoB started out as an online dating Yahoo! Group in late 2002. One of BoB's founders was Dhaka-born Quazi Haque (currently lived in Sydney, Australia) created the platform out of his determination to "provide a support network for the gay population of Bangladesh". However, both groups were closed down by Yahoo! authorities by the end of 2002. Nonetheless, after reopening on 4 January 2003, BoB remains active to date, having undergone changes, such as changing its name to Boys of Bangladesh. It has another ally called BOB Sylhet charity organization, based in Sylhet city, whose founder is Hifjur Rahman Jamil, and he is a graduator of the University of Lancashire.

Initially, BoB mostly remained an online group with sporadic, closely guarded, offline social events for its selected members, staying devoid of any political edge. It was not until May 2005 when it attempted to assert itself politically by sending a letter to The Daily Star newspaper, regarding the first International Day Against Homophobia and Transphobia, which was spearheaded by Tanveer Rouf. The letter, which presented a brief overview of the situation of gay community in Bangladesh and highlighted its main problems, met mostly with negative response, caused BoB to decide to stay apolitical. Here is an excerpt from the article:

"Indeed, the beginnings of that discussion did emerge, when a response to the homophobic letter in the Daily Star was published in the newspaper. But BOB’s continued stance as an apolitical group was then made clear to the group’s members, with a mass mailing that warned that no further discussion on the issue would be allowed on the message boards. As such, BOB definitively abandoned political activism – banning further discussion on the publicity incident and instead, according to the wishes of its members, started planning for a disco party. Since that time, BOB has remained an online gay group that caters solely to the entertainment and friendship needs of its members, without any reference to political issues whatsoever."

Around the same time, a safe sex campaign was initiated, offering HIV testings at the International Centre for Diarrhoeal Disease Research in Dhaka, and Boys of Bangladesh knotted co-operation with a Bangladeshi human rights organisation Ain o Salish Kendra (ASK) for a survey on sexual diversity. The number of group members had significantly grown by 2006, however, the state of emergency introduced in the country stopped BoB from organising any events for some period of time.

In May 2008, BoB celebrated the International Day Against Homophobia (IDAHO) at a café in Dhaka, which marked the first time when BoB appeared openly in public as a group of gay activists with the acknowledgment of the venue authority. In February 2009, with the help from the Norwegian National Association for Lesbian and Gay Liberation, BoB organised the first LGBT-related workshop in Bangladesh, titled "Workshop on Sexual Diversity, Partnership Building and Networking". November saw an arrangement of another event which met with positive reception.

Subsequently, Boys of Bangladesh secured an office space that would serve as its headquarters and resource centre. A rainbow flag was hoisted in the office premise to announce its existence as well as express its solidarity with the worldwide LGBT movement, which also marked the first time a rainbow flag had been unfurled in a public place in Bangladesh. In October 2010, BoB took part in the second instalment of "Under the Rainbow", a cultural event initiated by the Goethe-Institut in Bangladesh to discuss LGBT issues in the country. The five-day festival included movie screenings, art exhibitions and musical performances, bringing together leading human rights activists from within the country and abroad. In April 2011, BoB organised a conference with Bandhu Social Welfare Society (BSWS) and South Asian Human Rights Commission of Marginalized Sexualities and Genders (SAHRCMSG), and contributed to production of a short film Without Any Window of His Own, which was later screened at the International Festival of Documentary Film on Liberation and Human Rights in Dhaka's Central Public Library.

== Gallery ==
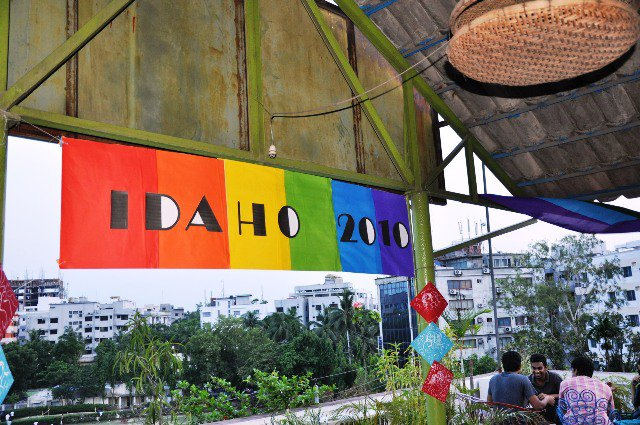
Members of BoB celebrating IDAHO in 2010

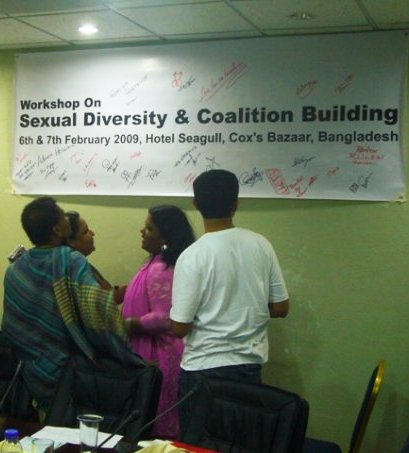
Workshop organised by BoB in 2009

== See also ==
- LGBT rights in Bangladesh
