= Bigudi Club =

Queer nightclub and bar in Istanbul, Turkey

Bigudi Club Bigudi Kulübü
- Interactive map of Bigudi Club; Bigudi Kulübü

Restaurant information
- Owner: Adar Bozbay
- Location: Mis Sokak No. 5, Şehit Muhtar, Beyoğlu, Istanbul, Turkey
- Coordinates: 41.035805°N 28.981629°E

Bigudi Club (Turkish: Bigudi Kulübü) is a lesbian and queer nightclub and bar located at Mis Sokak No. 5 in the Beyoğlu area of Istanbul, Turkey. It is the first lesbian-exclusive nightclub in the country of Turkey, established December 2006. Around 2017, they redefined the space as a queer bar, not exclusively for women.

== History ==
"I [wanted] to create something for only women because we have no space in Turkey. We have no space in Istanbul"

— Adar Bozbay, owner of Bigudi

In Turkey, historically lesbianism has not been encouraged or supported, this is particularly true within Turkish psychiatry. In the 1990s, lesbian organizations in Turkey were established to provide community support, including Sappho's Girls (Turkish: Sappho'nun Kızları) and The Sisters of Venus (Turkish: Venüs'ün Kızkardeşleri).

Bigudi Club opened in December 2006 by Adar Bozbay and was the first exclusively lesbian venue in the county. It was previously located a 5 İstiklal Caddesi in Şehit Muhtar, Beyoğlu, Istanbul. It is now at Mis Sokak No. 5 near the former location, and is situated on a terrace above an apartment building. Until 2016, the Bigudi Club was the only queer club for women in Turkey, and they struggled with harassment by police. Around 2017, the nightclub decided to open up to the larger queer community, not exclusively lesbian.

In March 2020 during the COVID-19 pandemic, the nightclub temporarily closed and was uncertain about the future. During this time of closure, Adar Bozbay started working in filmmaking and created the documentary film Incomplete Sentences (2021) (Turkish: Bitmemiş Cümleler), about the Turkish author and human rights activist Aslı Erdoğan.

== See also ==
- Istanbul Pride
- List of lesbian bars
- LGBT rights in Turkey
- Timeline of LGBT history in Turkey
