= 2026 Turkish LGBTQ raids =

2026 arrests of pro-LGBTQ+ activists in Turkey

- Date: 13 September 2026
- Location: Istanbul, Ankara, İzmir, Aydın and Mersin

Parties
Government of Turkey; Ministry of Interior	LGBTQ+ advocacy groups in Turkey; KAOS GL; Women's advocacy groups; HIV advocacy groups; Journalists; Protesters

In the early morning of 13 September 2026, prosecutors and courts in Turkey started a crackdown on LGBTQ+ advocacy groups and HIV advocacy groups, arresting 162 people, which then evolved into attacks on journalists and protesters. The government's justification for the crackdowns refers to a controversial policy called "My Family is Safe".

== Background ==
Turkish president Recep Tayyip Erdoğan, who in 2002 spoke out favorably on LGBTQ+ rights, has soured on pro-LGBTQ+ statements for some time. Erdoğan called LGBTQ+ rights a "tool of global dictatorship and against Islam" in 2022, and continued in 2023 that LGBTQ+ rights were "the biggest threat to Turkish families". In January 2025, amid declining birth rates, he declared 2025 the "Year of the Family", which sought to promote traditional Turkish family values and provide financial incentives to families and newlyweds. Erdoğan said that the global LGBTQ+ movement was a threat to traditional family values, arguing that "the target of gender-neutralisation policies, in which LGBT is used as a battering ram, is the family. Criticism of LGBT is immediately silenced; anyone who defends nature and the family is subject to heavy oppression."

In May 2025, as part of the Year of the Family, Erdoğan declared a national "Decade of Family and Population" beginning in 2026. During a speech announcing the initiative, he identified the LGBTQ+ movement as "a full-fledged fascism" that "tolerates no differing opinion", and a "threat" to "not only the family but also women, children, and human dignity". He stated that "the fight against LGBT perversion is also a fight for freedom, dignity, and the future of humanity." Prosecutors stated that an investigation had found evidence of minors being "inappropriately influenced" on LGBTQ+ issues.

These initiatives have been used as a legal basis for crackdowns against LGBTQ+ organizations and media, usually via accusations that such materials violate public morality, or are obscene. Obscenity is not clearly defined in law and same-sex relations are not a crime in Turkey.

== Crackdowns ==
On the morning of 13 September 2026, police started raiding LGBTQ+ clubs and advocacy groups as well as the homes and workplaces of activists and journalists. At least 162 individuals were arrested, and more than 100 detained in multiple locations including Istanbul, Ankara and İzmir. Amongst those raided was Turkey's longest-running LGBTQ+ advocacy group KAOS GL, and police detained the members of its board of directors. Justice Minister Akın Gürlek announced on social media that 13 businesses, 9 associations, and over a hundred suspects had been detained during "'My Family Is Safe' operations" in order to "protect children, the family, and public order". Gürlek further stated that the Financial Crimes Investigation Board (MASAK) was looking into financial transactions involving organizations that promote "LGBT issues and immorality".

Footage released by Turkey's Interior Ministry showed police searching filing cabinets, confiscating rainbow flags and escorting people away in handcuffs. The operation also involved raids on nightclubs and the homes of activists. Istanbul prosecutors said authorities seized digital devices, drugs and a firearm during the raids and arrested dozens of people.

Along with the raids that were taking place, Turkish courts issued rulings to block the social media accounts of advocacy groups, human rights organizations, newspapers, and journalists, including groups such as Amnesty International, along with women's advocacy groups. Emma Sinclair-Webb of Human Rights Watch accused authorities of attempting to smear and criminalise LGBTQ+ advocacy, saying that "we believe (the people arrested) include others not associated with LGBTQ+ groups (detained) for drug and prostitution offences."

== Tsunami crackdown on social media ==
Since the crackdowns started, the crackdown on social media has transformed into a "blocking tsunami", particularly on X, as the Turkish government has blocked over 1,000 accounts under the operation. These blocks were mostly carried out by Turkish prosecutors and courts, despite the lack of any law specifically targeting LGBTQ+ individuals.

On October 1, a Turkish court ordered the country's major independent news website T24 to be blocked. The court cited "LGBT propaganda" as the reason, despite there being no laws criminalizing it. A number of journalism associations and groups, such as the Association of European Journalists and the International Press Institute, released statements criticizing the court decision.

== Protests ==
On 15 September, demonstrations and protests started outside the Istanbul Courthouse, with heavy police forces surrounding them. Shortly after the rally started to grow, Turkish police intervened in the public rally and detained many pro-LGBTQ+ groups and activists. On 16 September, Turkish prosecutors and police started making arrests in several cities, such as Mersin and Istanbul, under the "My Family is Safe" operations. In İzmir, police teargassed hundreds of protesters. On September 19, 2026, many protesters started demonstrations outside of Turkish embassies across Europe and the United States in solidarity with the LGBTQ+ community.

== Reactions ==
Kaos GL called the crackdown "state-led discrimination, politics of fear and the dismantling of civil society". Human rights organisations condemned the raids. The Turkish Medical Association condemned the restrictions on organizations working on HIV/AIDS. New Party leader Özgür Özel called the operations "unconstitutional" and said that the Ministry of Justice should not "disregard the Constitution." The Left Party opposed the raids, and said that "None of us are safe". DEM Party co-chairman Tülay Hatimoğulları has said that "neither families nor others are safe".

The European Union said that they found the raids concerning. Nacho Sánchez Amor, the European Parliament's Turkey rapporteur has said that the raids were pushing Turkey to a "darker place". Christian Wigand, a spokesman for the European Commission, commented on Turkey's candidacy to join the European Union, stating that Turkey "should promote and ensure respect for the human rights and dignity of all individuals, irrespective of their gender identity or sexual orientation ... stigmatization and discrimination are contrary to the values of the Union." Germany, France, Sweden, Finland, the Netherlands and Iceland issued a joint statement of solidarity with the LGBTQ+ community in Turkey.

== See also ==
- Censorship in Turkey
- Human rights in Turkey
- LGBTQ in Turkish media
- LGBTQ rights in Turkey
