= LGBTQ in Turkish media =

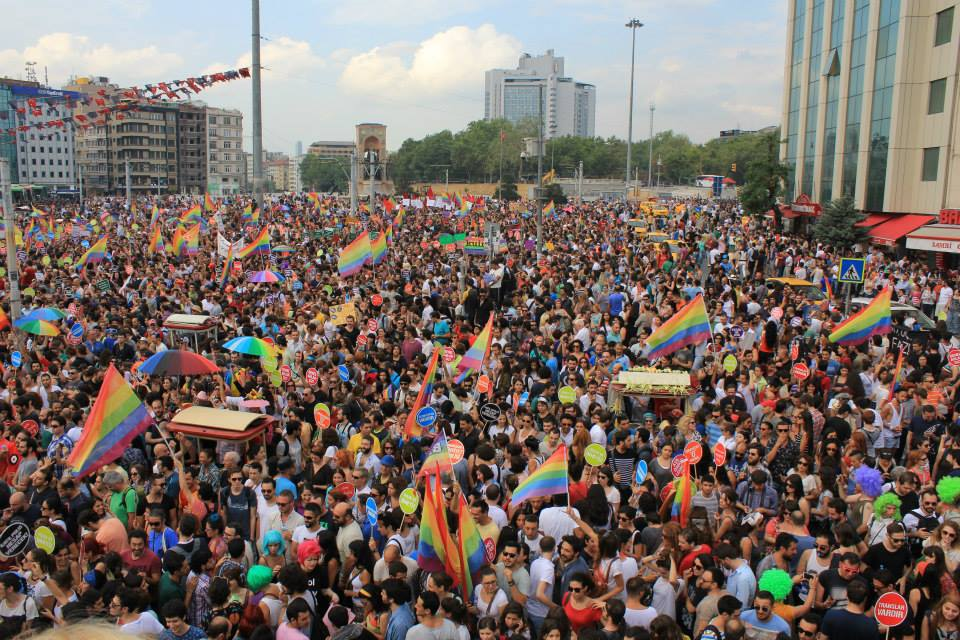
Gay pride Istanbul 2013 - Taksim Square

Turkish media's relationship with the LGBTQ community is highly complex. This relationship can be divided into several periods and eras, each marked by different political and social developments. The tone, coverage, and portrayal of LGBTQ individuals vary widely across the spectrum of Turkish media.

== General tone ==
Along with growing censorship, LGBTQ people have been labeled and portrayed in many different ways across the Turkish media spectrum. Predominantly pro-government media contributes to this, as most mainstream broadcasters are loath to contradict the government, so they either remain as distant as possible or adopt a negative stance. This behaviour in the media becomes even more pronounced in its coverage of Transgender people. Turkish media and censorship often adapts a more moral approach to LGBTQ+, and comes from a value and morals standpoint of gender boundaries to their reporting and bias.

== Coverage of LGBTQ topics ==
=== Media coverage ===
Historically, many mainstream broadcasters and newspapers covered LGBTQ issues, such as CNN Türk, NTV, and Star TV. However, coverage has drastically changed and decreased over the years as the government's stance and media ownership have changed.

The Turkish mainstream media is owned by a group of conglomerates that control much of the content. However, starting in late 2009, the Turkish government intensified the taxation of these conglomerates, and directed fines to the broadcasters. which had generally been opposition-oriented. These tax measures continued until 2018, when Doğan Holding, which owned many mainstream media outlets such as CNN Türk, Kanal D, and Hürriyet, sold them to the government-aligned Demirören Group. Several other television channels also changed ownership during this period.

Today, on paper, LGBTQ issues are discussed most openly in a number of publishers, such that is Turkey's current newspaper of record, Cumhuriyet, and similar opposition-oriented newspapers such as Sözcü and BirGün. Meanwhile, pro-government, liberal-oriented newspapers tend to take a more distant stance, such as Hürriyet. More religious newspapers, such as Yeni Şafak, generally cover LGBTQ issues more negatively.

On television, mainstream media tends to maintain a distant stance. Conservative channels such as A Haber speak very negatively about LGBTQ issues, while more centrist channels such as NTV generally remain distant or focus on international LGBTQ+events rather than domestic ones. Opposition, left-leaning channels, such as Halk TV, tend to take a more positive approach.

=== Negative coverage ===
While many mainstream media outlets are careful not to be explicitly labeled as anti-LGBTQ, they generally take a cautious approach to LGBTQ-related issues. The most negative coverage comes from more conservative, religious broadcasters such as A Haber, ATV, and the state broadcaster TRT. The state broadcaster, TRT, historically had a distant, and theoretically unbiased stance. However, as the Turkish government's stance shifted, so did TRT's, and in 2026, the broadcaster's streaming service, tabii, released an anti-LGBTQ documentary called Rainbow Fascism., along with growing hate speech.

== Coverage of LGBTQ pride events ==
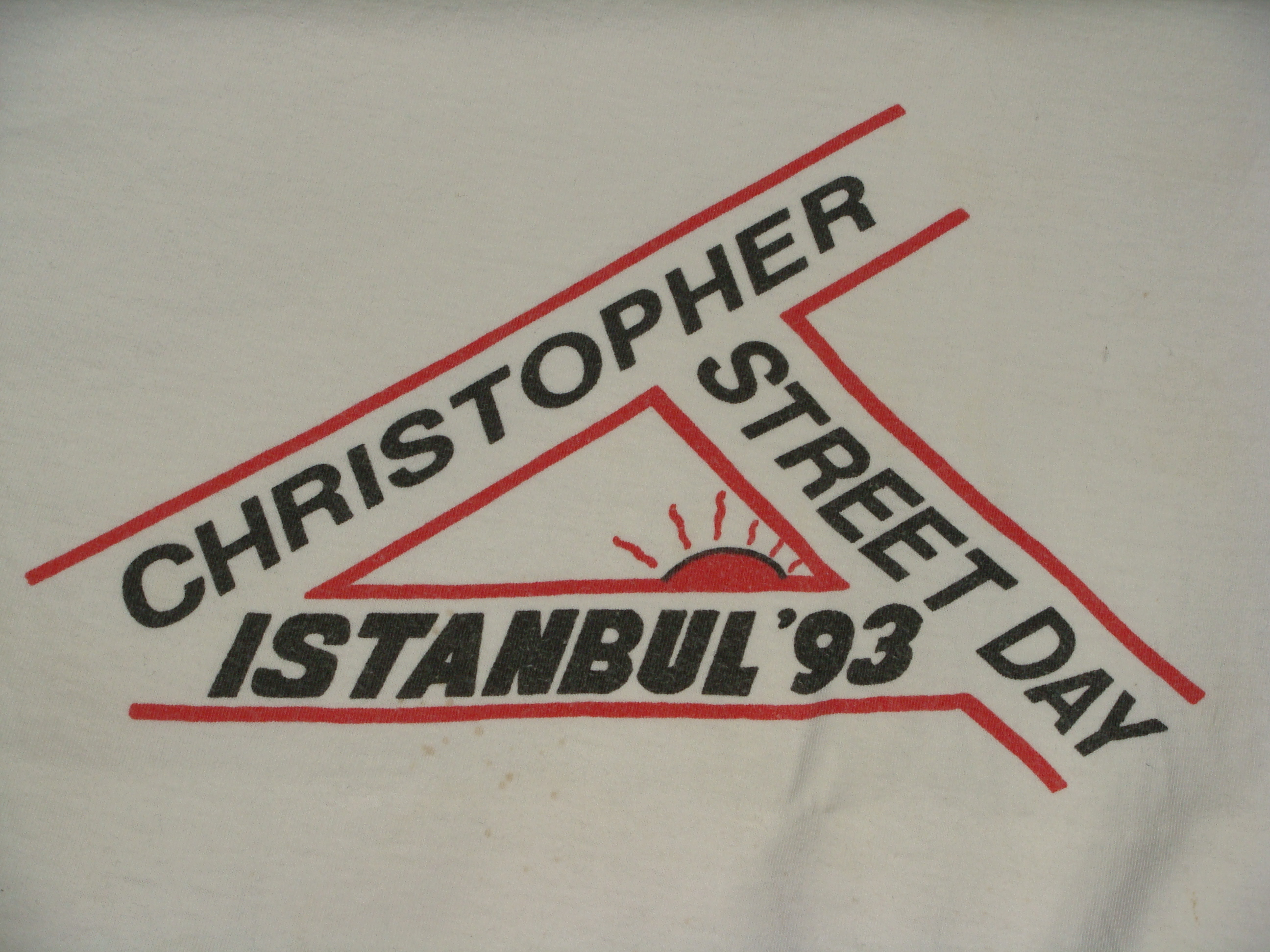
Christopher street day Istanbul 1993

Starting from the 1990s until 2015, Turkey hosted a number of pride parades in major cities, such as Istanbul, Izmir, and Ankara. Following Turkey's recognition as a candidate for joining the European Union, Ankara passed a series of "harmonization packages" to meet international expectations of improving the conditions for minorities and for civil society in general.

The media had a mixed reaction, with, until 2018, Doğan Holding's media organs, such as CNN Türk and Kanal D, were sold to the government-aligned Demirören Group. The end of Turkey's Accession to the European Union contributed to the change in the government's stance as well.

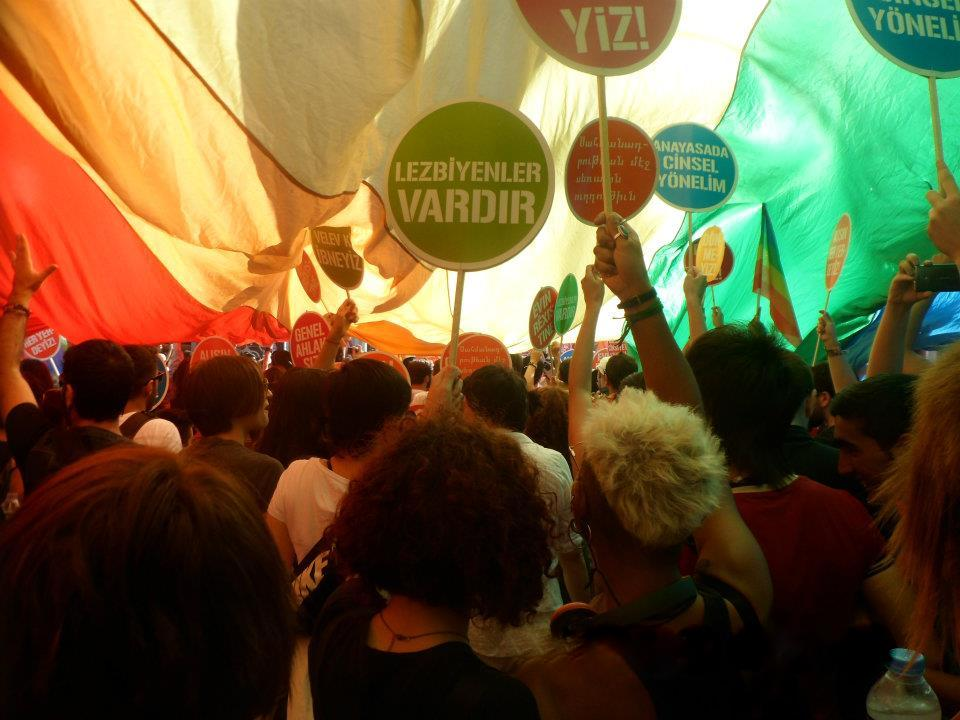
Istanbul Turkey LGBT pride 2012

In 2015, the change in government policy led to the Governor of Istanbul refusing to give permission for Istanbul Pride. The government's policy shifted further afterwards, which resulted in the governor rejecting the event repeatedly in consecutive years.

=== Censorship ===
The censorship of Turkish media mainly comes from the watchdog Radio and Television Supreme Council, which has fined broadcasters that air content the government does not like, including opposition, criticism, and LGBTQ content.

The council has requested the removal of much LGBTQ content and announced penalties following inspections conducted under the government's "Year of the Family" initiative.

== Websites and social media ==
Hornet, an LGBTI+ dating and meeting app, was blocked in 2020. The block was lifted in 2023 but reimposed in 2026 - at the time the management claimed to have over 3 million users in Turkey. Several similar apps and social media accounts were also blocked in 2026.

=== GaBiLe ===
Gabile.com screenshot from August 2012

Gabile.com is a Turkish website for the LGBT community, managed from Istanbul, which provides an online LGBT community by services such as dating, chatting and sexual advice. As of 2013, it was Turkey's largest gay dating portal and LGBT social network. The organization was founded in 1999. It allows profile creation on the website, online chat and gives away information and news related to LGBT events, alongside photos, personal writings made available to people with all different sexual orientations. In 2009, there were 225,000 registered users from Turkey using the website. Four different membership types or preference are available for people who utilize the service: users, contacts, clubs and escorts, The website is available in 4 different languages and covers topics related to different sexual orientations, including active gay, passive gay, AP gay, lesbian, bisexual male, bisexual female, transvestite, and transgender Many artists, including Seyhan Arman, have worked as a columnist for the website. The organization works in partnership with Shemaleturk.com, a website exclusive to gay and transgender people. On the radio channel Radyo Gabile, many celebrities including Sibel Tüzün, Yonca Evcimik, Zeynep, Aydın, and Vj Bülent, have participated as guests. Gabile is also the owner of a gay bar in Taksim Square called Club Otherway.

==== Background ====
The website has been active since 1999, founded by Can under the pseudonym "Eskuel" and Tamer under the pseudonym "Eriss".

==== Content ====
The +18 option is located next to the Gabile emblem on the website. Members cannot upload pictures that may have pornographic nature or create pornographic perception, nor can they have sexual correspondence. The membership agreement states that individuals under the age of 18 cannot be members. Also on the website it specifically mentions things such as pornography, users under the age of 18, slang, and inappropriate behavior are prohibited.

==== Censorship ====
Gabile.com was blocked in Turkey and made inaccessible following the Presidency of Telecommunication and Communication's (BTK) decision to take administrative measures on the grounds that "the photos of members in swimsuits are encouraging prostitution" and "promoting it". Following the block of the website, in the news section of the Gabile.com website's main page a statement was made available:

"BTK has taken illegal decisions to this day, such as censoring YouTube, Google Groups, Camfrog, the Vatan Newspaper, and many other repressive, anti-democratic decisions due to conservatism and based on an Islamic form of government that do not allow variety as a result; thus both the country and the citizens of this country are victimized and the state reputation is disastrously damaged. The already weak intellectual resources of this country are being destroyed terribly. We condemn those who disregard all of our ideas, lifestyle, sexual identity and all other freedoms and we stand against these practices that bring the public to the brink of rebellion!"

After the block by BTK, the world press described the incident as a scandal. The initiative of the Amsterdam Homoloket LGBTQ families and its related institutes announced that they had found the decision "homophobic" by publishing a protest letter. In the written statement made by the Information and Communication Technologies Authority following the censorship, BTK announced "that they removed the offensive content from the Internet sites and took the necessary measures to prevent these contents from appearing on other sites." In the same statement, it was clarified that the block had been lifted following technical investigations and reviewing the contents thoroughly.

=== Ayı Sözlük ===
Ayı Sözlük ("Bear Dictionary") was an LGBTQ collaborative dictionary founded by İlker Bozkurt on 14 August 2011. The majority of the contributors are LGBTQ individuals. The purpose of establishing the dictionary is to make the voice of LGBTQ individuals heard as a part of the society, to defend LGBTQ rights, to enable them to write freely, to support young LGBTI individuals in their acceptance processes, to make them feel that they are not alone and wrong, and to fight against transphobia, homophobia, and hate crimes. Sözlük yazar kadrosu içinde gönüllü avukatlar hukuk danışmanlığı yaparken sözlük yazarları arasında gönüllü psikologlar da bulunmaktadır. Over time, it has become a community that organizes events and conducts charity projects. Since July 2014, they have been accepted as an LGBTQ community by ILGA.

The LGBTQ culture and life magazine Homojen, prepared by Ayı Sözlük and its founder and independent activist İlker Bozkurt, was first published on 5 September 2015. The reason for the journal's name being Homojen (homogeneous) is "to emphasize that every individual living in society has the right to live without discrimination without any reason". Homojen, which is the first culture and lifestyle magazine featuring LGBT content in Turkey, began to be published in print on 3 September 2016.

A voluntary team of doctors, psychologists, psychology counselors, education counselors, social workers, sociologists, and lawyers are among the authors of Ayı Sözlük, providing voluntary and free support to individuals who need support under the patronage of ASDİ (Ayı Sözlük LGBTQ + Psycho-Social Support Initiative).

==== Statistics ====
The dictionary, which has reached 2,466 registered users, has a total of 313,003 different definitions under 55,194 titles as of 2015. In November 2012, it ranked seventh among the collaborative dictionaries in Turkey. In August 2014, it ranked eighth on the same list in Turkey. In 2015, it appeared again on the list of popular collaborative dictionaries and ranked 10th and 9th in June and July respectively. Ayı Sözlük is the first LGBTQ dictionary to rank among the top 10 collaborative dictionaries in Turkey. In April 2016, it had 4211 unique monthly visitors.

==== Other platforms ====
On the dictionary's mobile application, features such as "link abbreviation apparatus" for shortening long links, "zirvetör" in which dictionary activities are created, and "notices" posted by users are included. In addition, the dictionary has an LGBTQ Culture, Art and Life magazine called Homojen, an LGBTQ themed film, series, documentary, and clip promotion portal called Ayılarock, and a psycho-social support initiative that supports LGBTQ+ individuals called ASDİ.

==== Activities ====
All dictionary authors have the right to organize meetings called "zirve" summits in which other authors may participate. Since its inception, 97 events have been held as of 2015.

== See also ==
- Istanbul Pride
- LGBTQ rights in Turkey
- Mass media in Turkey
- Censorship in Turkey
- Homosocialization
