= Seyhan Arman =

Turkish actress and activist

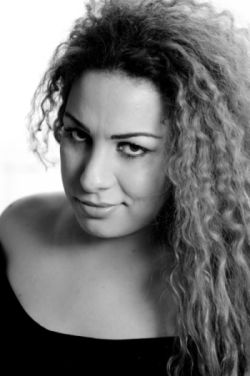
- Born: 26 February 1980 (age 46); Adana, Turkey
- Other name: Derya Seyhan Arman
- Occupations: Actor, drag queen
- Years active: 1994–present
- Website: Official website

Derya Seyhan Arman (born 26 February 1980) is a Turkish transgender rights activist, actress, and drag queen. Born in Adana she moved to Istanbul in 2000. Since 2014 she has performed on stage as "Matmazel Coco" (Mademoiselle Coco). She wrote, produced and performed in Küründen Kabare (Cabaret of Sham), and later appeared in several television series and films. She was one of the 100 women featured by the BBC in 2016. During the 2026 Turkish LGBTQ raids her website was blocked in Turkey.

== Filmography ==
Year	Title	Role	Notes
1997	Böyle mi Olacaktı		TV series
2001	Yeditepe İstanbul		TV series
2004	Sil Baştan		TV series
2004	Melekler Adası	Alev	TV series
2005	Beyza'nın Kadınları		Movie
2007	Menekşe ile Halil	Cici	TV series
2008	Hiç	Singer	Movie
2008	Transgenders		Short film
2008	Gitmek: Benim Marlon ve Brandom		Movie
2009	Teslimiyet	Hayat	Movie
2009	Akasya Durağı	Gözde	TV series
2009	Teleferik	Seyhan	Short film
2010	Güneşi Gördüm	Fifi - Drag queen	Movie
2010	Ezan Çiçeği	Patroniçe	Short film
2010	Gelin		Short film
2010	Peki		Short film
2011	Papaz Kimde	Ajlan	Movie
2011	Kolpaçino: Bomba	Vocalist	Movie
2011	Kibrit		Short film
2011	Gassal	Gassal	Short film
2011	Komik Bir Aşk Hikayesi	Transsexual woman	Movie
2012	Behzat Ç. Bir Ankara Polisiyesi	Alev	TV series
2012	Vuslat	Burcu	Short film
2013	Sislerin İçinde	Hanife	Short film
2014	Çekmeceler	Seyhan	Movie
2014	Nerdesin Aşkım?	Özge	Short film
	Pose		Netflix series
