= Yasemin Öz =

Lawyer and LGBT rights activist

Yasemin Öz is a Turkish lawyer and LGBT rights activist. Whilst studying law, she founded KAOS GL and writes reports monitoring human rights issues in Turkey. Öz participates in UN Women groups and was given the Felipa de Souza award by OutRight Action International in 2013.

== Early life ==
Yasemin Öz studied law at the Ankara University. She joined a group of students who met to discuss LGBTIQ issues. In 1994, the group became KAOS GL, the Kaos Gay and Lesbian Cultural Research and Solidarity Association (Turkish: Kaos Gey ve Lezbiyen Kültürel Araştırmalar ve Dayanışma Derneği). KAOS GL is now a leading LGBT organisation in Turkey.

== Career ==
Öz graduated in 1997 and started to work as a lawyer, whilst continuing her activism with KAOS GL. She also took cases for the organisation, helping it to gain legal status as a foundation in 2005 and appealing the censorship of a magazine focusing upon the experiences of Turkish trans women. Öz writes reports on human rights issues in Turkey. She authored one about transphobia and homophobia for the Danish Institute of Human Rights and produces an annual report for KAOS GL monitoring discrimination against LGBTIQ people. In 2015, she drafted "LGBTI People’s Freedom of Expression on the Internet" (Turkish: LGBTİ’lerin İnternet Yoluyla İfade Özgürlüğü).

Öz participates in the UN Women LGBTI Informal Reference Group and Europe and Central Asia Civil Society Advisory Group. She has also supported the campaign of academic Pınar Selek against prosecution for an explosion in Istanbul in 1998. She was given the Felipa de Souza award by OutRight Action International in 2013. Öz describes herself as a lesbian feminist.
