= KAOS GL =

LGBTQ organisation in Ankara, Turkey

- Kaos GL Derneği
- Established: 1994
- Type: Voluntary association
- Headquarters: Ankara
- Website: kaosgl.org

KAOS GL, short for Kaos Gay and Lesbian Cultural Research and Solidarity Association (Turkish: Kaos Gey ve Lezbiyen Kültürel Araştırmalar ve Dayanışma Derneği), founded in 1994, is one of the oldest and largest organisations for LGBTQ rights in Turkey. In 2005, the Ankara-based organisation became the first Turkish LGBT organisation to be legally registered as an association, after their application was initially appealed by the deputy governor of Ankara. The organisation has been publishing the journal KAOS GL (now a quarterly publication) since its founding. The group operates the KAOS Cultural Center, which hosts cultural activities and meetings, and shows of films. The centre also houses a library of LGBTQ history in Turkey.

The organization has also taken a stance on broader issues of human rights in Turkey. In 2017, a spokesperson for the organization stated: "AKP started a war against all opponents, not only Armenians. They stop opposition groups coming together and taking collective action. Social justice and peace is under our responsibility". As part of a crackdown on LGBTQ expression, 21 people, including the organization's board of directors were detained by police in 2026 for an investigation into Kaos GL.

== History ==
Founded in 1994, KAOS GL is one of the oldest LGBT rights organisations in Turkey. Students at Ankara University including Yasemin Öz met to discuss LGBTIQ issues and decided to start the group.

=== Struggle for legal registration ===
In July 2005, KAOS GL applied for Association status with the Ministry of the Interior. Subsequently, Ankara's deputy governor Selahattin Ekremoğlu petitioned a court to close the organisation, referring to articles 56 and 4721 of the Turkish Civil Code prohibiting establishment of an organisation that is against laws and morality. The threat of closure was criticized by the International Lesbian and Gay Association and Human Rights Watch, who considered it a violation of basic rights and yet another attempt at suppressing civil society in Turkey. In October 2005, Ankara prosecutor Kursat Kayral however decided not to proceed with the case, concluding that homosexuality can't be equated with immorality. While in 2008 similar charges were brought against Istanbul-based LGBT organisation Lambda Istanbul, KAOS GL has been a legally registered non-government organisation (NGO) since October 2005.

=== Immorality and obscenity court cases ===
A 2006 magazine was banned for over 5 years because some unspecified articles and pictures were “contrary to the principle of protecting public morality”, but eventually issued after a ruling by the European Court of Human Rights.

== March against Homophobia and Transphobia ==
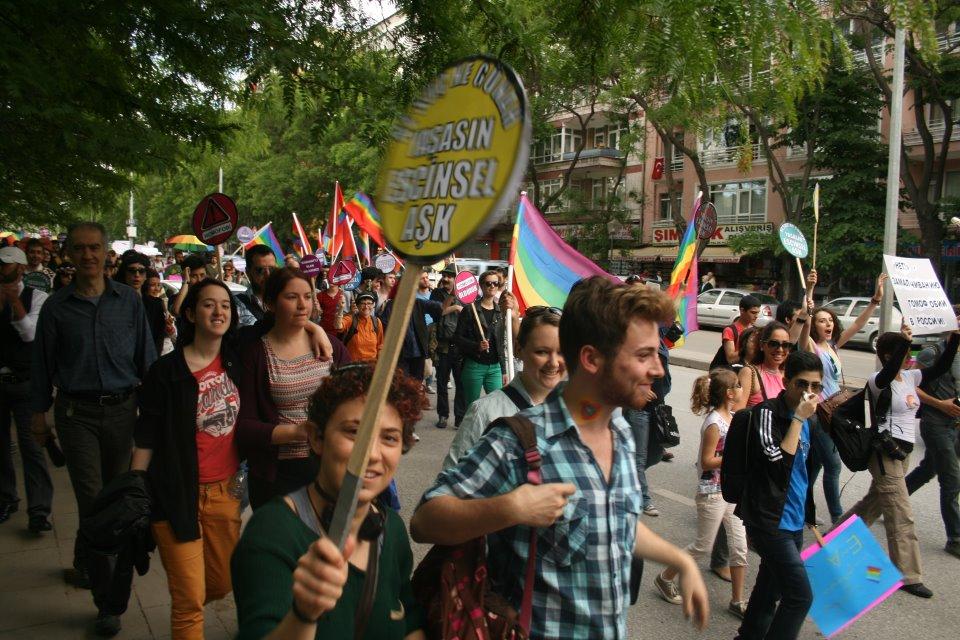
March against Homophobia and Transphobia in 2012, Kurtuluş Park, Ankara

The March against Homophobia and Transphobia (Turkish: Homofobi ve Transfobi Karşıtı Yürüyüş) is an LGBT pride parade and LGBTQ demonstration held annually in Turkey's capital, Ankara. The event first took place in 2003 and now occurs each year on either the last Sunday of June or the first Sunday of July, to mark the end of Ankara pride week.

Participants assemble in Cebeci. This is a wide pedestrianized boulevard and one of Ankara's most important public spaces, the frequent home of bayram and regional festivals.

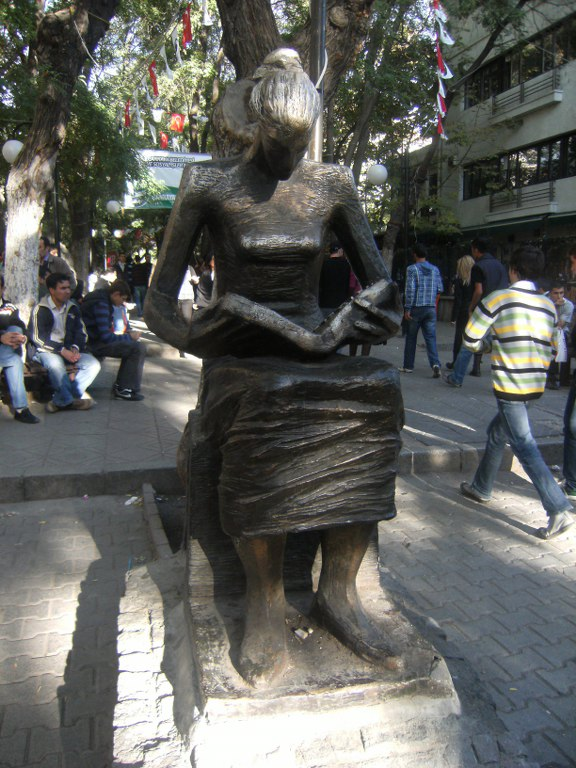
Human Rights Monument, Yüksel Street, Ankara

On 17 May 2008, the fifth International Day Against Homophobia, Kaos GL and Pink Life LGBTT Association jointly organised the first annual LGBT march in Ankara. Joined by British MEP Michael Cashman and Dutch feminist writer Anja Meulenbelt, over 100 gay men and women, bisexuals and transgender people assembled in front of the Human Rights Monument in Yüksel Street, marching towards the parliament. Police, outnumbering the demonstrators, stopped the march, demanding the rainbow flags and banners be taken down. Otherwise, the march proceeded.

In May 2009, Kaos GL organised the second annual march against homophobia and transphobia in Ankara. Around 300 people marched from Kurtuluş Park to the Human Rights Monument in Yüksel Street. The demonstration ended with a press statement, which called for the acknowledgement of lesbians, gays, bisexuals, transvestites and transsexuals (LGBTT).

Kaos GL has been organising international anti-homophobia meetings since May 2006. The Anti-Homophobia Meeting was first held as a four-day hall event in May 2006. In 2007, together with the central events, "Campus Meetings Against Homophobia" were realized in the three biggest university campuses of the capital, Ankara. The 4th annual meetings took place in six cities, from 1 May to 17 May 2009. The 4th International Anti-Homophobia Meeting started with the 1 May march in Ankara; and ended with the 17 May Anti-Homophobia March again in Ankara. Additional meeting took place also in the cities of Izmir, Eskisehir, Van, Diyarbakir and Istanbul together with Ankara.

== Notable members ==
- Defne Güzel.

== See also ==
- LGBT rights in Turkey
- Category:LGBTQ museums and archives
