= Defne Güzel =

Turkish LGBTQ activist

Defne Güzel is a Turkish human rights activist. A transgender woman, she is known for her advocacy and defence of LGBTQ people in Turkey, as well as people living with HIV and AIDS.

== Activism ==
Güzel is from Ankara. She is the chairperson of 17 Mayıs Derneği (lit. '17 May Association'), which monitors and documents LGBTQ rights violations in Turkey, in addition to addressing issues of hate crimes and discrimination against LGBTQ people. Güzel is also the human rights expert and advocacy coordinator for KAOS GL's human rights programme. Güzel founded Pozitif Alan (lit. 'Positive Space'), which defends the rights of people living with HIV and AIDS.

Güzel has volunteered with various Turkish human rights organisations, including the Human Rights Association, Red Umbrella, and the Women's Platform for Equality (EŞİK).

== Prosecution ==
In 2024, during an audit of 17 Mayıs Derneği by the Ministry of Interior's Ankara Directorate of Relations with Civil Society, a notice was filed with the Public Prosecutor's Office, alleging that some of the organisation's social media posts were not "in line" with its objective within its official statute. On 9 July 2025, an independent panel appointed by the Prosecutor's Office found no irregularities within 17 Mayıs Derneği's activities.

The Directorate of Relations ignored the ruling of the panel, and on 20 January 2026 filed a criminal complaint against Güzel in her role as chairperson of 17 Mayıs Derneği for violating the law on association and disrupting the "mental, moral, psychological and social development" of people. The evidence included two publications made by 17 Mayıs Derneği, including #BenimİnterseksHikayem (lit. 'My Intersex Journey'), a Turkish-language translation of an Oll Europe book about the lived experiences of intersex people, and Çocuklar, Karacalar, Çiçekler, Ateşler (lit. 'Children, Roe Deer, Flowers, Fire'), which included medical images of naked women. Güzel was accused of violating "public morality". A hearing was scheduled for 12 May 2026 at the Ankara 74th Criminal Court of First Instance. At that hearing, Güzel was acquitted of all charges.

=== Response ===
Güzel's lawyer, Kerem Dikmen, stated the charges against her violated her right to freedom of association, and accused the charges being linked to the Turkish government's declaration of the "year of the family". They warned that the charges risked "criminalising" intersex people.

The Turkish human rights organisation SAFI Network expressed worries that the evidence used against Güzel included social media posts utilising the hashtag "#BenimİnterseksHikayem" that had not been written or published by Güzel or 17 Mayıs Derneği. EŞİK, which Güzel had previously volunteered for, stated it stood in "solidarity" with her and described the charges as "social engineering" that threatened the "fundamental human rights" of Turkish citizens. The international organisation Front Line Defenders expressed "deep concern" at the charges against Güzel and stated it was part of repeated efforts by Turkish authorities to criminalise LGBTQ rights groups operating in Turkey; it called for the charges to be dropped. The international LGBTQ organisation IGLYO called for greater public awareness of the prosecution of LGBTQ activists in Turkey, including Güzel, Enes Hocaoğulları and Yıldız Yar.
