= Emma Sinclair-Webb =

Turkey director of Human Rights Watch

- Organization: Human Rights Watch

Emma Sinclair-Webb is the Turkey director of Human Rights Watch. She regularly appears in international media with commentaries and reports on the human rights situation in Turkey, especially since Recep Tayyip Erdoğan became head of state.

== Career ==
Sinclair-Webb holds a degree from the University of Cambridge and a PhD from the Department of Politics and Sociology at Birkbeck College with a thesis on religious and urban conflict. She speaks Turkish.

She taught cultural studies and humanities at Middlesex University and also worked as an editor in the publishing industry in the areas of history, culture and politics of the Middle East.

From 2003 to 2007, she worked as a researcher at Amnesty International specializing in Turkey, before joining Human Rights Watch in 2007 as a Senior Turkey Researcher in the Europe and Central Asia Department. Here she worked on issues such as police brutality, state-sponsored killings and enforced disappearances, as well as the misuse of terrorist laws. She later became Turkey director of the human rights organization.

In 2016, Sinclair-Webb lived in Istanbul.

== Publications (selection) ==
=== Monographs ===
- Imagined Masculinities. Changing Patterns of Identity for Middle Eastern Men. Saqi Books. 2000. ISBN 978-0863560422.
- Closing ranks against accountability : barriers to tackling police violence in Turkey. Human Rights Watch short reports, Turkey. 2008. ISBN 9781564324092.
- Protesting as a terrorist offense: the arbitrary use of terrorism laws to prosecute and incarcerate demonstrators in Turkey. Human Rights Watch. 2010. ISBN 978-1-56432-708-6.

=== Reports and articles ===
- Time for Justice. Ending Impunity for Killings and Disappearances in 1990s Turkey. 2012-09-03.
- Turkey's Human Rights Rollback. Recommendations for Reform. 2014-09-29.
- The Trajectory of Legal Reform for Advancing Human Rights in Turkey and the Role of Civil Society. LSE Middle East Centre Collected Papers |. 2015. pp. 15–23.
