= LGBTQ rights in Turkey =

- Location of Turkey (green) in Europe (darker shade) – [Legend]
- Legal status: Homosexuality decriminalised since 1858
- Gender identity: Gender reassignment surgery legal since 1988
- Military: No
- Discrimination protections: Yes (Note: Discrimination is prohibited under the Turkish Constitution. The Court of Cassation specifically prohibits discrimination in the workplace.)

Family rights
- Recognition of relationships: No
- Adoption: No

Lesbian, gay, bisexual, transgender, and queer (LGBTQ) people in Turkey face significant challenges not experienced by non-LGBTQ residents. Homosexuality has not been a criminal offence since the Ottoman Empire adopted a new penal code in 1858, and transgender people have been able to change their legal gender since 1988.

However, Turkey has no comprehensive law prohibiting discrimination on the basis of sexual orientation or gender identity, and LGBTQ are barred from serving openly in the military. Same sex relationships receive no legal recognition: same sex marriage, civil unions and domestic partnerships are not available in Turkey, and same sex couples cannot adopt jointly or as joint parents.

When the 12th judicial reform package passed in 2026, provisions discriminating against LGBTQ people were removed from the bill, which made symbolic same sex weddings possible, though these carry no legal marital status. Because Turkish marriage law determines eligibility by the gender recorder in a person's civil registry rather than by trans status, individuals who have legally changed their registered gender may marry a partner of the opposite registered gender.

Istanbul hosted the first gay pride march held in a Muslim majority country in 2003, and annual marches in Istanbul, Ankara and other cities drew growing crowds through the 2010s, with the 2013 and 2014 Istanbul marches each attracting more than 100,000 participants. Since 2015 however, authorities have banned Pride events in Istanbul and other cities in most years, and police have used tear gas, water cannons and mass detentions against participants who defied the bans.

In ILGA-Europe's 2026 Rainbow Europe ranking, Turkey placed 47th out 49 countries assessed, ahead of only Azerbaijan and Russia. In early 2026, Turkish media reported the government was considering legislation criminalising public advocacy of "behaviour contrary to biological sex", though this provision was ultimately not included in that year's judicial reform package. Public attitudes have shifted gradually, surveys by Kadir Has University found support for equal rights for LGBTQ people rising from 33% in 2016 to 45% in 2020. While a 2020 Pew Research Center survey found that 25% of the Turks believed homosexuality should be accepted by society, against 57% opposed. In his 2023 winning speech, President Recep Tayyip Erdogan accused opposition parties of being pro-LGBTQ while labeling the LGBTQ+ community as "perverted movements".

== History ==
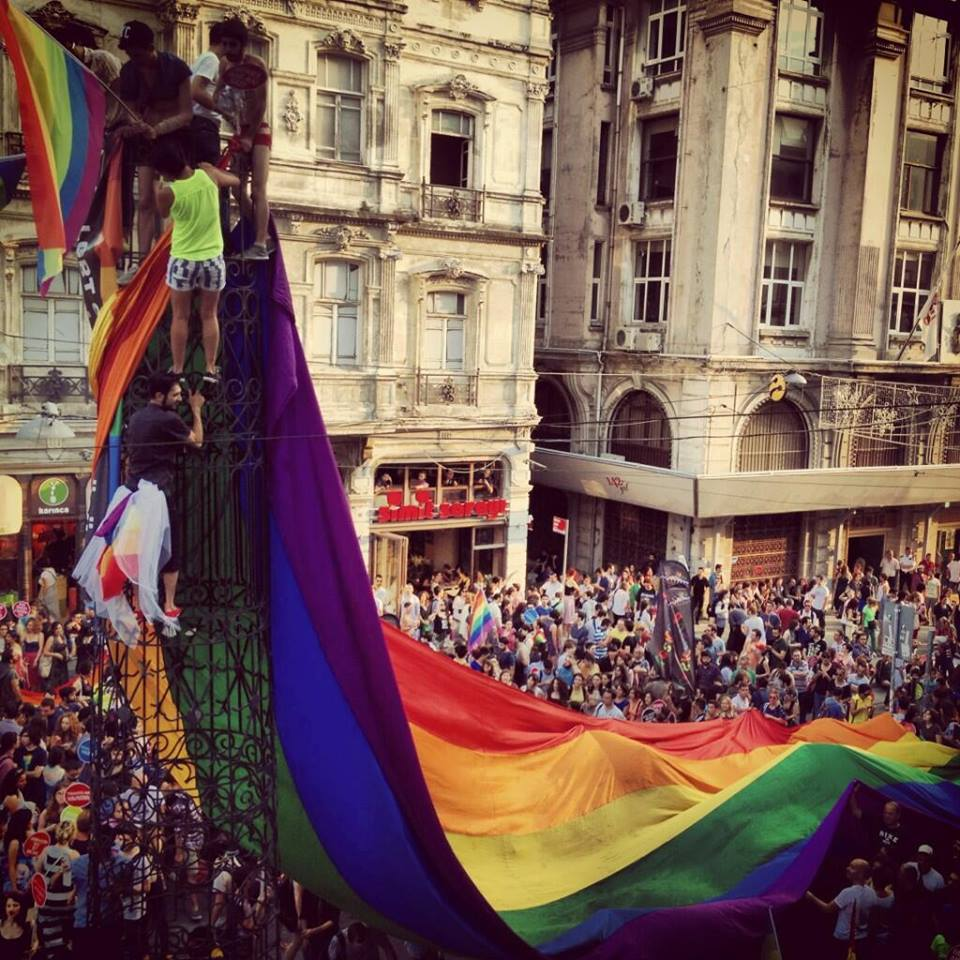
Istanbul Pride in 2013, İstiklal Avenue, Istanbul

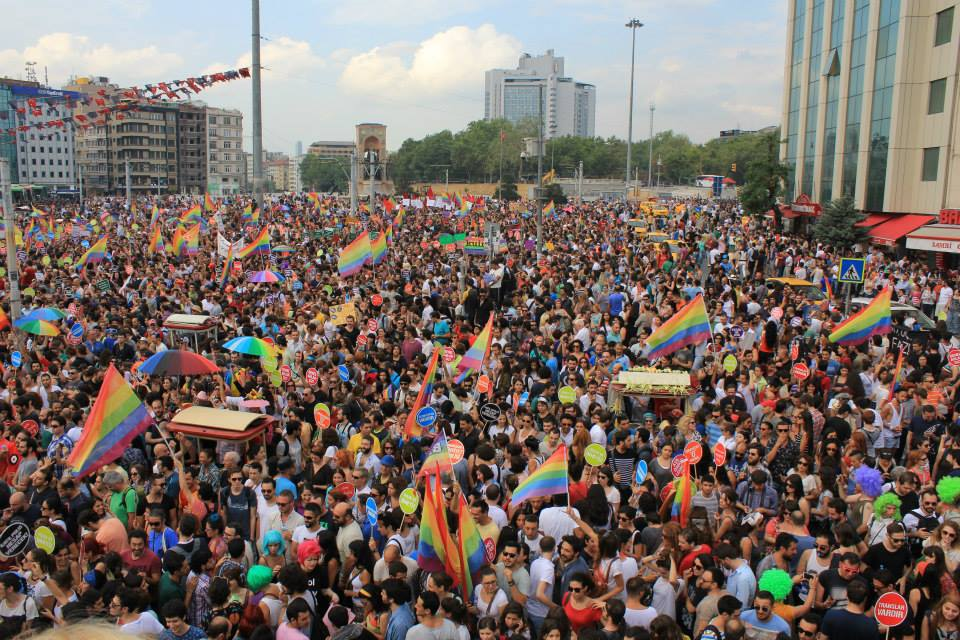
Istanbul Pride in Taksim Square

=== During the Ottoman Empire ===
The Ottomans, before the 19th-century, did not base sexual identities on attraction to a specific gender but distinguished between active and passive partners, often distinguished as "the lover" and "the beloved". Therefore, choice of a partner was merely based on taste and not on sexual identity. This made certain types of same-sex attraction permissible, but this attraction was most often legitimized in a pederastic context.

By the late 19th century, homosexual contact started to decline and the focus of desire turned to young girls. Ahmet Cevdet Pasha stated:

Woman-lovers have increased in number, while boy-beloveds have decreased. It is as if the People of Lot have been swallowed by the earth. The love and affinity that were, in Istanbul, notoriously and customarily directed towards young men have now been redirected towards girls, in accordance with the state of nature.

Research shows that the decline is in close relationship to the criminalization of homosexuality in the Western world, which followed repression of the queer community.

=== Republican period ===
In the 1980s, the national government, whether democratically elected or as a result of a coup d'état, opposed the existence of a visible LGBTQ community, especially within the political context.

Some openly gay people were able to be successful in the 1980s. Murathan Mungan has been openly gay throughout his professional life as a successful poet and writer. However, many gay and bisexual men who lived during this period have since said in interviews that they felt pressured by social attitudes and government policy to remain in the closet about their sexual identity.

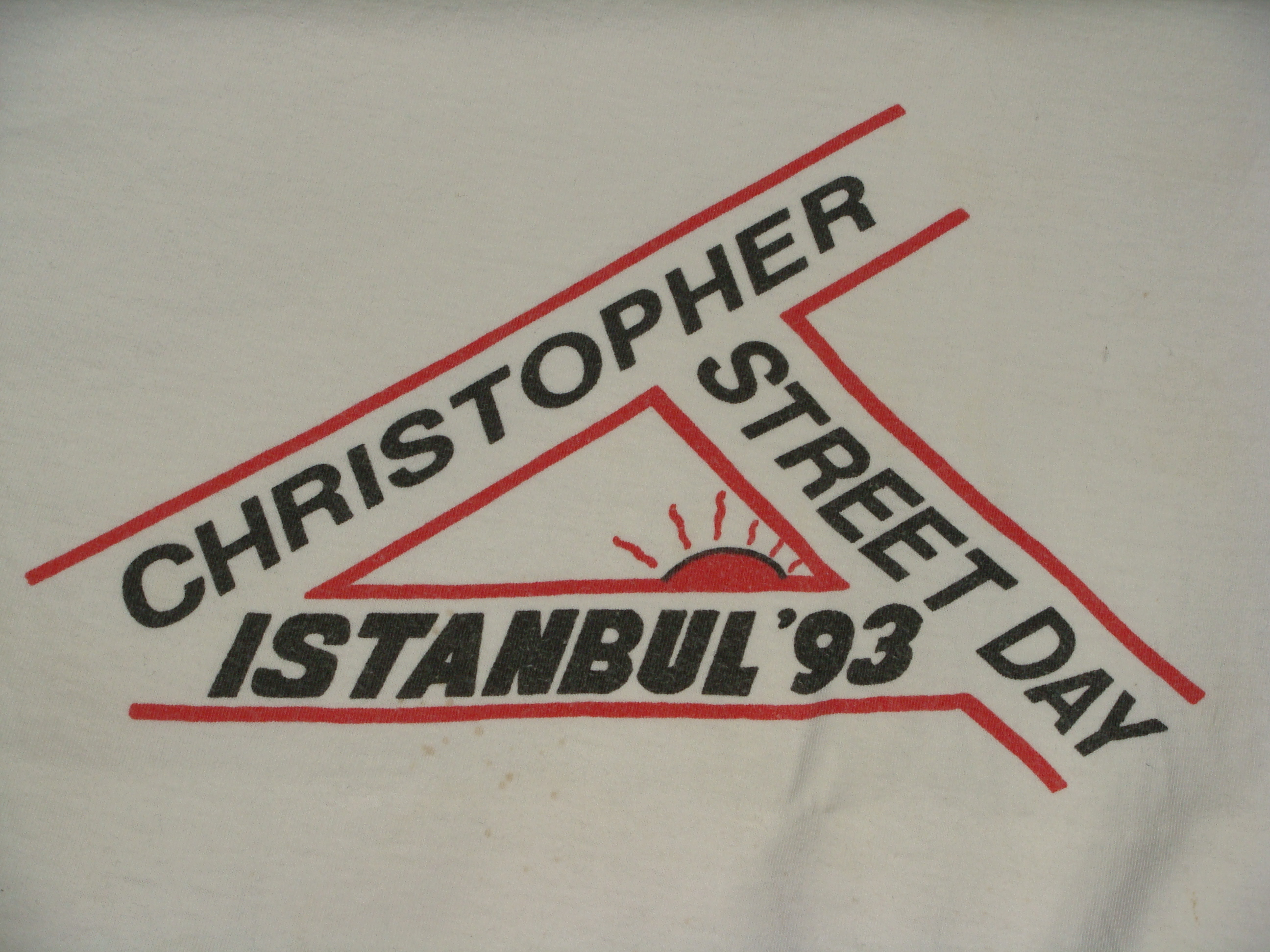
Original T-shirt designed for the first Christopher Street Day celebration march in 1993

In the 1980s, the Radical Democratic Green Party expressed support for gay rights, including the work of a group of transgender people to protest police brutality. However, it was not until the 1990s that many members of the LGBTQ community in Turkey began to organise on behalf of their human rights.

In 1993, Lambda Istanbul was created to campaign on behalf of LGBTQ rights in Turkey. In 1994, the Freedom and Solidarity Party banned discrimination on the basis of sexual orientation and gender identity within the party and nominated Demet Demir, a leading voice of the community, to successfully become the first transgender candidate for the local council elections in Istanbul.

In 1993, organisers were denied permission to hold an LGBTQ pride parade. Similar opposition was expressed by the government in 1995 and 1996 for an LGBTQ film festival and academic conference. Government officials cited vaguely worded laws designed to protect public morality as justification for refusing to allow these public events to take place.

In 1996, the Supreme Court overturned a lower court's ruling and removed a child from her lesbian mother on the grounds that homosexuality is "immoral".

Throughout the 1990s, reports by IHD, Turkey's Human Rights Association as well as international human rights organizations such as Amnesty International stated that transgender people were frequently harassed and beaten by police officers. One article even stated that police had set fire to an apartment block with many transgender people residing there.

Reports of harassment and violence against LGBTQ people still occur in the twenty-first century. In 2008, a gay Kurdish-Turk student, Ahmet Yıldız, was shot outside a café by his father and later died in the hospital. Sociologists have called this Turkey's first publicised gay honour killing. The wish of the Turkish Government to join the European Union has put some pressure on the government to grant official recognition to LGBTQ rights. The report on progress in Turkey for the accession to the European Union of 14 October 2009, the European Commission for Enlargement wrote:

The legal framework is not adequately aligned with the EU acquis...
Homophobia has resulted in cases of physical and sexual violence. The killing of several transsexuals and transvestites is a worrying development. Courts have applied the principle of 'unjust provocation' in favour of perpetrators of crimes against transsexuals and transvestites.

In 2003, Turkey became the first Muslim-majority country in which a gay pride march was held. In Istanbul (since 2003) and in Ankara (since 2008) gay marches were being held each year with an increasing numbers of participation until 2015.

On 30 June 2013, Istanbul Pride parade attracted almost 100,000 people. The protesters were joined by Gezi Park protesters, making the 2013 Istanbul Pride the biggest pride event ever held in Turkey. The 2014 Istanbul pride attracted more than 100,000 people. The 2015, 2016, 2017, and 2018 pride parades were banned by local authorities, and participants were faced with police attacks. In June 2013, the first İzmir Pride took place with 2,000 participants. On 3 June 2018, the 6th İzmir Pride Parade peacefully took place with over 50,000 participants. Another pride took place in Antalya. Politicians from the main opposition party, CHP and another opposition party, BDP also lent their support to the demonstration. The pride march in Istanbul does not receive any support of the municipality or the government.

In 2009, amateur football referee Halil İbrahim Dinçdağ came out as gay and was subsequently banned from refereeing football matches. In December 2015, the Turkish Football Federation was ordered to pay 23,000 lira in compensation for dismissing Dinçdağ.

On 21 September 2011, the Minister of Family and Social Policies Fatma Şahin met with an LGBTQ organisation. She said that the government will actively work together with LGBTQ organisations. She submitted a proposal for the acceptance of LGBTQ individuals in the new constitution that Parliament planned to draft in the coming year. She was calling on Members of Parliament to handle the proposal positively. She asserted that "if freedom and equality is for everybody, then sexual orientation discrimination should be eliminated and the rights of these LGBTQ citizens should be recognised."

On 9 January 2012, a columnist named Serdar Arseven for an Islamist newspaper called Yeni Akit wrote an article calling LGBTQ people perverts. The Court of Cassation penalised Yeni Akit with 4,000 TL fine and Serdar Arseven with 2,000 TL for hate speech.

In May 2012, the BDP requested the writers of the new Turkish constitution to include same-sex marriage in that constitution. It was rejected by the biggest party in the Turkish Parliament, the AKP, and an opposition party, MHP, while supported by the main opposition party, the CHP.

On 29 May 2013, a parliamentary research motion regarding LGBTQ rights in Turkey was proposed and discussed in the parliament of Turkey. Despite support from pro-Kurdish BDP, secularist CHP, and the abstention of Turkish nationalist party MHP, the motion was rejected by votes of the ruling party AKP. AKP MP Türkan Dağoğlu cited the scientific articles on homosexuality published in the US in 1974 and said, "Homosexuality is an abnormality. Same-sex marriages may not be allowed. It would cause social deterioration." For the research motion, CHP MP Binnaz Toprak said, "In the 1970s there were scientists suggesting that black people were not as smart as white people in the US. Hence the science of today doesn't accept the findings of those times. Your sayings can not be allowed."

LGBT-themed DVDs can also be legally sold in Turkey, albeit DVDs with sexually explicit content may only be sold to people eighteen years of age or older. In 2013, a Turkish vendor was charged with selling "immoral" DVDs because the DVD movies featured gay sexually explicit content. Judge Mahmut Erdemli from the court in Istanbul overturned the criminal charges. He ruled that gay sex is natural, stated that an individual's sexual orientation should be respected, and cited examples of same-sex marriages in Europe and in the Americas.

In 2013, Grindr, a social networking and hookup app targeted to gay men, was banned by the Istanbul Anatolia 14th Criminal Court of Peace.

On 12 August 2013, the Constitutional Reconciliation Commission, which was drafting a new constitution of the Republic and was composed of four major parliamentary parties including Kurds, secularists, Islamists and nationalists, agreed to provide constitutional protection against discrimination for LGBTQ individuals. The draft was later cancelled.

On 17 July 2014, Turkey's Supreme Court ruled that referring to gays as "perverted" constitutes hate speech.

In November 2016, Turkey, along with Georgia, Israel, Japan, Mongolia, Nepal, the Philippines, South Korea, Sri Lanka, Thailand, East Timor and Vietnam, were the only Asian countries in the United Nations to vote in favor of the appointment of an independent expert to raise awareness of the discrimination faced by the LGBTQ community and to find ways to properly protect them.

In June 2018, the embassy of Turkey, along with ambassadors from 51 countries signed an open letter of support for LGBTQ rights in Poland.

In March 2021, Turkey withdrew from the Istanbul Convention, blaming the LGBT community for its withdrawal. In an official statement by the Turkish Presidency, it argued that "the Istanbul Convention, originally intended to promote women's rights, was hijacked by a group of people attempting to normalize homosexuality – which is incompatible with Turkey's social and family values." The view was shared by conservative Turkish ruling party Justice and Development Party (AKP), who claim that the agreement promotes homosexuality. Turkish President Recep Tayyip Erdoğan justified their withdrawal as "completely legal." Later in 2021 restrictions and political rhetoric targeting LGBTQ people intensified. Amnesty International reported that Turkish authorities imposed blanket bans on and other restrictions on Pride marches and used unnecessary, and in some cases, excessive force against participants. Anti-LGBTQ rhetoric from senior government officials also increased during the period surrounding the 2023 elections.

Following the 2023 presidential election, LGBTQ rights remained a main issue in Turkish politic rhetoric. After winning re-election in May 2023 President Recep Tayyip Erdoğan accused opposition parties of being "pro-LGBTQ" and referred to LGBTQ people as part of "perverted movement" in his victory speech. LGBTQ organizations 17 Mayıs and Kaos GL condemned the rhetoric and said that the election campaign had been marked by hostility towards LGBTQ people. The organizations also pledged to continue their advocacy of LGBTQ equality and freedom.

Restrictions continued in 2024 and 2025. Pride events and LGBTQ themed gatherings were repeatedly disallowed, while police detained participants and activists. Amnesty International reported that the 2024 Pride season was marked by bans on gatherings and violence against protestors.

In May 2025, Erdogan declared a "Decade of Family and Population" beginning in 2026, with a focus on promoting traditional family structures and improving the country's birth rate. During his speech, Erdogan attacked the LGBTQ movement as a "threat" to "not only the family but also women, children, and human dignity", explaining that these "perversions" were "legitimized under the guise of respect for personal choices" and had "turned into a tyranny that tolerates no differing opinion, a full-fledged fascism". He stated that "the fight against LGBT perversion is also a fight for freedom, dignity, and the future of humanity."

Authorities began to increasingly use claims of "obscenity"—which is not clearly defined in law.—to target LGBTQ organisations, arguing that pro-LGBTQ materials violated public morality. In April 2026, Genç LGBTI+ was ordered to dissolve after posting materials on social media that officials in İzmir considered "obscene" and in violation of the Turkish constitution's article on protecting the family. Eleven founders of the group were also put on trial. In September 2026, in support of the Decade of Family and Population, Turkish authorities began a crackdown on LGBTQ+ and HIV support organizations known as "My Family is Safe". On 14 September 2026, authorities began coordinated raids in several cities, arresting dozens of people and blocking the groups' websites. According to reports the investigation involves 162 suspects, 9 associations and 13 businesses. Officials say the crackdown is intended to protect children, families and public order, and have raised allegations involving foreign funding and criminal activity. The European Union called out the crackdown and stated that "stigmatization and discrimination are contrary to the values of the union".

== 2026 crackdown ==
On 12-13 September 2026, Turkish police coordinated raids on LGBTQ+ organisations, venues and activists' homes across several provinces, in an operation government branded "My Family Is Safe". The raids were followed by further detentions, online blocking orders and court actions to close LGBTQ+ associations and police interfered with solidarity protest. On 14 November 2026, LGBTQ+ activists took part in a civil society climate march in Antalya during the COP31 summit, carrying rainbow flags while international campaigners formed a protective ring around them. Their participation had been planned in advance police mounted a large security operation around the march. According to AFP, demonstrators were allowed to join only after being searched and civil society groups raised security concerns about the summit after the September raids.

== Laws and litigation ==
Turkey is in the ECHR, which has case law. The constitution says that everyone has the right to march peacefully. KAOS GL has a case pending since 2023, alleging ineffective remedies in Turkish law against alleged discrimination such as bans on some Pride marches. According to a February 2026 report by Türkiye newspaper the government is considering a introducing a law criminalizing publicly encouraging "behavior contrary to biological sex", with a sentence of one to three years in prison. However, this was not in the 2026 omnibus bill (the 12th judicial package).

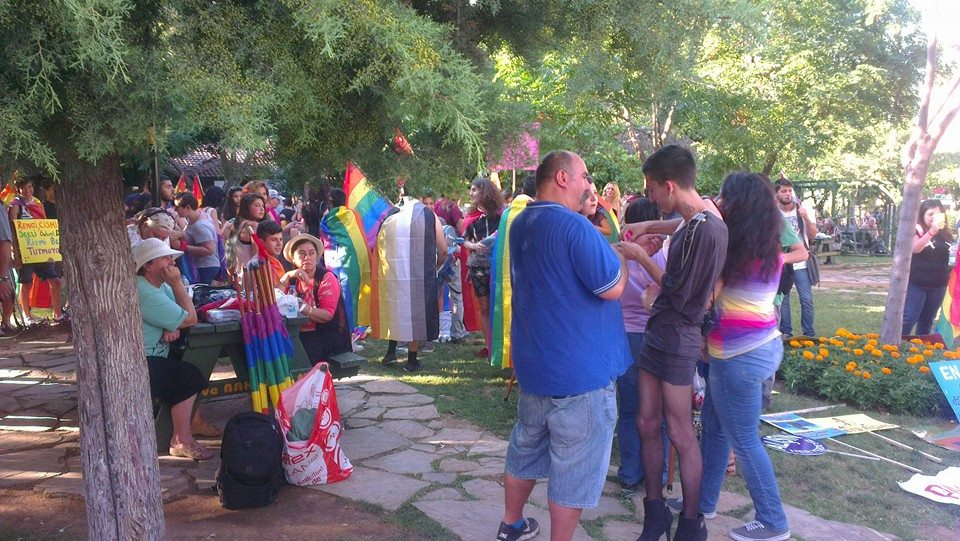
Pride in İzmir in 2014

Gay sex between consenting adults in private is not a crime in Turkey. Turkey does not recognise same-sex marriages, civil unions or domestic partnership benefits. Same-sex marriage or civil unions are not illegal, but they are officially impossible, as the law does not recognize official same-sex marriage. However, when the 12th judicial package was passing through parliament, provisions that discriminated against LGBTQ individuals were removed; this made symbolic same-sex weddings and marriages possible.

Under Turkish law, marriage is still defined as a union between a man and a woman. Therefore, the gender listed in official records is the determining factor. A trans woman officially registered as female can marry someone officially registered as male., A trans man officially registered as male can marry someone officially registered as female. In other words, what matters legally is not whether a person is trans, but the gender recorded in the civil registry. LGBT marriage other than for trans individuals is legally impossible.

== Military service ==
In Turkey, compulsory military service applies to all male Turkish citizens between the ages of 18 and 41. However, the Turkish military openly discriminates against homosexuals by barring them from serving in the military. At the same time, Turkey – in violation of its obligations under the European Convention on Human Rights – withholds any recognition of conscientious objection to military service. Some objectors must instead identify themselves as "sick" – and some were forced to undergo what Human Rights Watch calls "humiliating and degrading" examinations to "prove" their homosexuality.

In October 2009 the report of the EU Commission on Enlargement stated: "The Turkish armed forces have a health regulation which defines homosexuality as a 'psychosexual' illness and identifies homosexuals as unfit for military service. Conscripts who declare their homosexuality have to provide photographic proof. A small number have had to undergo humiliating medical examinations."

In November 2015, the Turkish Armed Forces removed the clause stating that a draftee must "prove" their homosexuality. Draftees may decide to disclose their sexuality verbally and receive an 'unfit report' during their medical examination which exempts them from service, or must not disclose their orientation in any form for a year if a military doctor agrees to grant them a 'fit report' and serve their conscription. Those who disclose their homosexuality and receive an 'unfit report' may be subject to future discrimination in public life as the military's record of homosexuals in the drafting process has resulted in several cases of public leaks. Homosexuality remains grounds for expulsion for commissioned officers, non-commissioned officers and military students under the Turkish Armed Forces Discipline Law.

There is little support in the army in favour of greater acceptance; in a 2015 study asking 1,300 officers "whether homosexuals should be allowed to serve in the army", 96.3% answered negatively.

== Discrimination protections ==
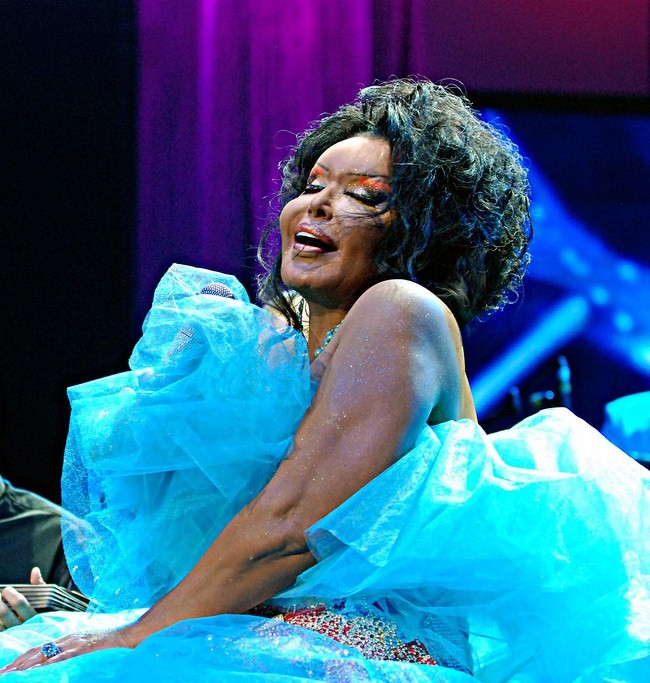
Bülent Ersoy, the first openly transgender celebrity (singer) starts wearing makeup and feminine clothing in her performances and makes appearances on Turkish National TV (TRT) during the 1970s.

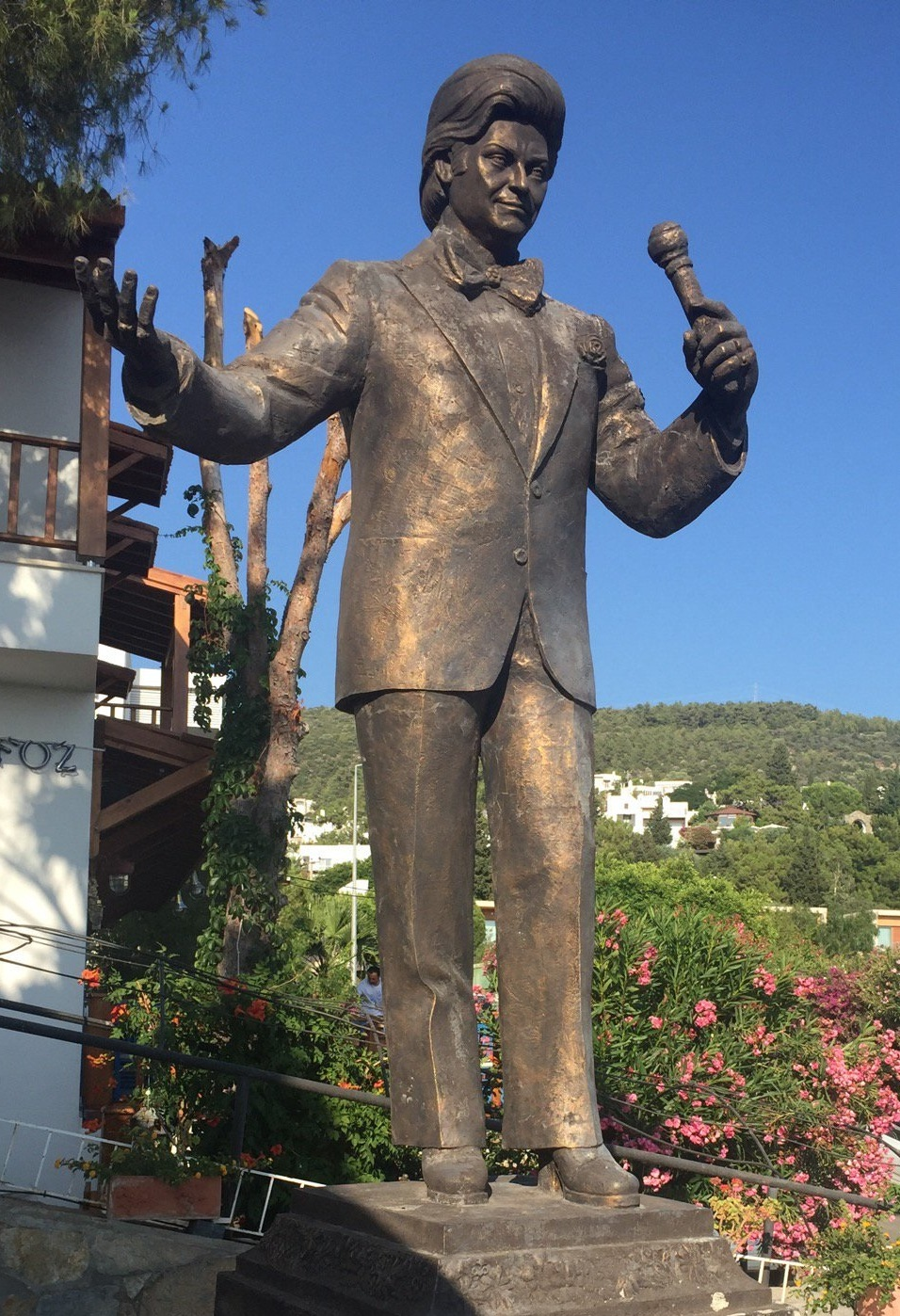
A statue of Zeki Müren, one of the prominent figures of the Turkish classical music who never commented on his sexual orientation, but the general public opinion was that he was homosexual

Although discrimination is officially prohibited, the EU Commission on Enlargement has for some time recommended that Turkey improves its laws and their implementation to properly protect LGBTQ people, but as of 2025 Turkey had not done so and in their annual report the commission wrote that "The legal protection of the rights of lesbian, gay, bisexual, transgender, intersex and queer(LGBTIQ) persons is insufficient and not aligned with the EU acquis. Moreover, LGBTIQ persons are subject to discrimination, hate speech and stigmatisation." and that authorities were "granting official permissions for demonstrations that promote exclusion and discrimination".

In 2011, Öykü Evren Özen, a transgender woman from the northwestern province of Bursa, became a candidate for deputy from the main opposition party, Republican People's Party, or CHP. She was the first transgender lawmaker of Turkey during the general elections.

The main opposition, CHP, proposed gay rights to the Turkish parliament on 14 February 2013.

Lesbian, gay, bisexual and transgender (LGBT) individuals are among the most vulnerable asylum seekers and refugees in Turkey today. Their access to rights and services is limited in Turkey as a result of anti-LGBTQ sentiments of state actors and the general public.

In August 2013, three major political parties in the parliament including the secularist CHP which worked with BDP on the matter, conservative AKP and nationalist MHP, has agreed to provide constitutional protection against discrimination for LGBTQ people. The draft was later canceled due to nonconcurrences regarding other subjects in the new constitutional draft.

Can Çavuşoğlu, a Turkish activist, has launched a campaign as the first openly gay mayoral candidate of Turkey, Çavuşoğlu announced a bid to run in the Black Sea region, a town of Bulancak, Giresun, home to about 60,000, in the March 2014 local elections.

In February 2015, the main opposition CHP introduced a bill to prohibit discrimination based on sexual orientation and gender identity in both public and private sectors. The bill seeks equal recruitment, pay, promotion, dismissal in the workplace and reforms in the Turkish Armed Forces Code of Discipline that would allow members of the military to serve openly.

In 2015, the Kurdish Peoples' Democratic Party publicly announced that they will have LGBTQ and feminist candidates. Barış Sulu, a candidate of the left-wing People's Democratic Party (HDP), became the first openly gay man to run for the Turkish parliament.

In January 2019, the 34th Labor Court in Istanbul issued the first verdict in a legal case surrounding three garbage truck drivers in the Kağıthâne Municipality who were fired by their employer after it was alleged that they were in a gay relationship with a 27-year-old garbage collector. The garbage collector, identified only as M.Ş., had told the authorities that he had engaged in sexual relationship "from time to time" with the three truck drivers. The drivers, aged between 43 and 51, had sued the municipality and its subcontractor in April 2018, citing what they described as unjust termination of their contract. On 29 January, the court ruled in favor of one of the plaintiffs, identified as R.S., concluding that his contract was unjustly terminated. His attorney had told the court that the plaintiff "had got nothing to do with that incident," while the company lawyers had claimed that his dismissal was part of "rightful termination" due to the sexual relationship at work. If the ruling is approved in the appeals process too, the subcontractor will be forced to return the plaintiff to his previous job or to compensate him. A hearing for one of the other two cases, which still continue, was held in February.

== Gender identity and expression ==
In Turkey, the minimum age required to get sex reassignment surgery is 18. In order for one to change one's gender section on an identity card, the procedure must be conducted at a state hospital. Sex reassignment surgery is available in Turkey's major cities like Istanbul, Ankara, İzmir and Antalya. However, Turkey has very limited trans rights compared to other countries that allow gender reassignment. Hormone replacement therapy for transgender individuals is not covered by the government healthcare system, and there is no direct discrimination protection regarding gender identity in Turkish law.

== Media regulations ==
In 2013, Grindr, a social networking and hookup app targeted to gay men, was banned by the Istanbul Anatolia 14th Criminal Court of Peace.

Under article 8/1f of Turkish broadcasting law, the Radio and Television Supreme Council (RTÜK) has the authority to suspend or ban television programmes that are contrary to "national and moral values" or "the principle of protection of family", and issue fines of up to 3% of an outlet's annual revenue for violations of broadcasting law. In 2019, legislation extended RTÜK's scope to include internet "broadcasters" as well. RTÜK has been regularly accused of using vague rulings under article 8/1f to target independent and opposition-run broadcasters. RTÜK president Ebubekir Sahin has stated that the regulator's goal is "protecting children, youth and the family structure."

RTÜK has used article 8/1f to target pro-LGBT content; in 2023, Halk TV was charged with contravening "national and moral values" after trans activist Esmeray Özadikti said on-air "I am sure that LGBT+ children, especially those from Generation Z, who are seeing me on the screen right now, are very happy and do not feel alone." In 2025, these efforts intensified after the regulator signed a "protocol" with the Istanbul Family Foundation to promote pro-family content in broadcasting, stating that it would consider LGBTQ+ content to be a violation of "national and moral values". In September 2025, it issued fines against Amazon Prime Video, Disney+, HBO Max, Netflix, and Mubi, totalling 3% of their domestic revenue, for hosting LGBTQ+ content it deemed a violation of moral and family values.

== Restriction of expression ==
The rights of expression regarding LGBTQ topics have been eroded alongside the democratic backsliding in Turkey since 2013.

In Turkey, everyone has the constitutionally protected right to hold a peaceful protest without prior permission, and may only be restricted on the grounds of national security, public order, prevention of commission of crime, protection of public health and public morals, and to protect the rights of others. According to its organisers, the Istanbul Pride parade in 2015 was denied permission on account with the Muslim holy month of Ramadan. After it was held regardless, police dispersed the attendees with a water cannon. In 2016, it was banned again and arrests were made as participants tried to hold the rally regardless of the prohibition. It was banned again in 2017, and in 2018 it was banned again and arrests were made as participants tried to hold the rally regardless of the prohibition. It was banned again in 2019. In 2020, due to the COVID-19 pandemic, it was held online with no official interference.

In 2017, the capital city of Ankara banned the public showing of films and exhibitions related to LGBT issues. The governor's office claimed the action was taken to provide peace and security. It stated that such exhibitions could cause different groups of society to "publicly harbour hatred and hostility" towards each other. As of 2025 the Pink Life QueerFest is still banned.

In November 2017, the Ankara governor's office under state of emergency imposed an indefinite ban on LGBTI-focused public events. The emergency rule ended in July 2018, but the ban has not lifted.

In June 2018, the Governorship of Adana banned local Adana pride parade. In October 2018, the government extended the ban to LGBTI-focused events generally without giving any idea about the end date. In May 2019, police in Ankara broke up a student Pride march at the Middle East Technical University, arresting at least 25 students.

On 14 June 2019, the 7th İzmir Pride, the 3rd Antalya Pride and the 27th Istanbul pride were banned by the cities' governors. On 19 June, a court suspended said ban. On 22 June 2025, Turkish police dispersed a crowd gathered in İzmir for a public press statement by the 7th Izmir LGBT+ Pride Week Organizing Committee regarding the governorate's pride parade ban. After allowing the statement to be read, police detained 17 people.

On 25 June 2019, the Governorship of Mersin banned all LGBTQ events to be held in the province for 20 days under the Turkish Law on Meetings and Demonstrations "with the aim of maintaining public well-being and public peace, preventing crimes and protecting public health, public morality and safety of life and property of citizens." The ban went in effect in the 5th Mersin Pride Week, which was to be held between 1–7 July. In June 2021, police blocked the first Eskişehir pride parade.

== Public opinion ==
According to a survey conducted by the Kadir Has University in Istanbul in 2016, 33 percent of people said that LGBTQ people should have equal rights. This increased to 45 percent in 2020. Another survey by Kadir Has University in 2018 found that 55.3 percent of people would not want a homosexual neighbour. This decreased to 46.5 percent in 2019.

Attitudes towards the legalization of same-sex unions in Turkey are mixed. A 2015 poll by Ipsos found that 27% of the Turkish public was in favor of legalizing same-sex marriage, while 19% preferred civil unions instead. 25% of those surveyed were against any form of legal recognition for same-sex couples and 29% stated that they did not know which option to choose.

Ipsos results (2015)
Statement	Agree
"Same-sex couples should be allowed to marry legally."	27%
"Same-sex couples should be allowed to obtain some kind of legal recognition, but not to marry."	19%
"Same-sex couples should not be allowed to marry or obtain any kind of legal recognition."	25%
Undecided	29%
Total	100%

According to the 2020 Pew Research, 25% of the Turks said homosexuality should be accepted by society, with 57% opposing it. The acceptance was higher among educated people (41%) and youth (34%).

== Living conditions ==
Homosexuality is a taboo subject in Turkey and the culture of "honour killings" can be observed in some families murdering members (usually female) who engage in sexual behaviours regarded by some as morally inappropriate. The murder of Ahmet Yıldız, a 26-year-old Kurdish gay man from Şanlıurfa, may be the first known example of an honour killing with a gay male victim. Studies for the years 2007–09 prepared by the German Democratic Turkey Forum show 13 killings in 2007, 5 in 2008 and at least 4 killings in 2009 related to the sexual identity of the victims. On 21 May 2008 the New York-based organization Human Rights Watch published a report entitled "We Need a Law for Liberation". The report documents how gay men and transgender people face beatings, robberies, police harassment, and the threat of murder. Human Rights Watch found that, in most cases, the response by the authorities is inadequate if not nonexistent. In case of hate murders against homosexuals, courts apply the condition of "heavy provocation" and lower sentences.

According to the research of KAOS GL, 27% of LGBTQ people who did not hide their sexual identity were discriminated against in the recruitment process in 2017, 8% in 2018, 11% in 2019. The study stated that LGBTQ people, who think that the institutions they apply for are biased, are more inclined to hide their sexual identity, so this rate will be higher if the applicants open to employers.

== LGBTQ civil rights organisations ==
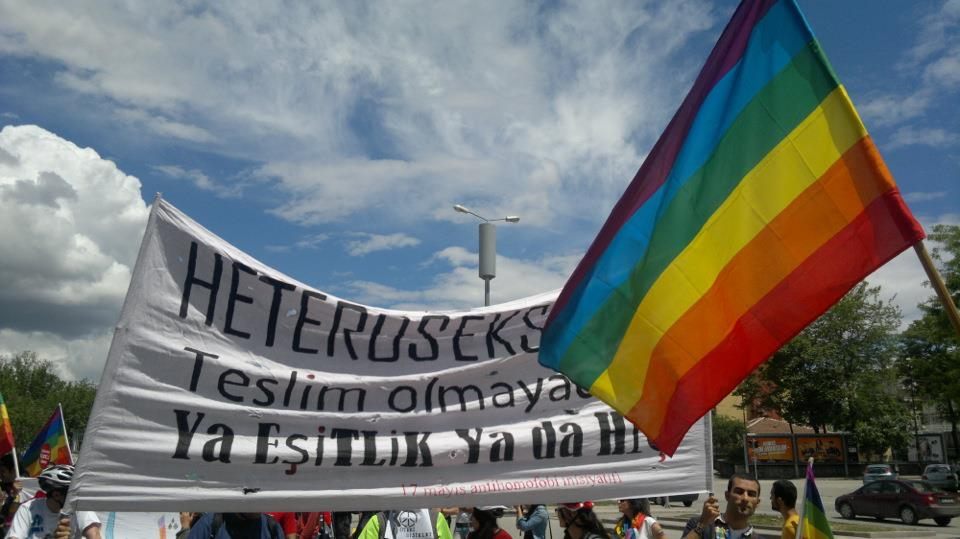
Ankara Pride parade in 2012, Kızılay, Ankara

The EU says that civil society organisations are administratively harassed and prosecuted. The major LGBTQ community-based civil rights organisation is KAOS GL, established in 1994 in Ankara by students including Yasemin Öz. Lambda Istanbul, a member of ILGA-Europe, established in 1993 in Istanbul, was sued on the charges of acting against public morality. The prosecution argued that its name and activities were "against the law and morality." That ruling, sharply criticised by Human Rights Watch, was finally overturned by the country's Supreme Court of Appeal on 22 January 2009.

In September 2005, the Ankara Governor's Office accused KAOS GL of "establishing an organisation that is against the laws and principles of morality." It also attempted in July 2006 to close the human rights group Pink Life LGBT Association (Pembe Hayat), which works with transgender people, claiming to prosecutors that the association opposed "morality and family structure." Both charges were ultimately dropped.

In 2008, a court case was launched to close down Lambda Istanbul, and although a lower court initially decided in favour of closing down the association, the decision was overruled by the Turkish Constitutional Court and Lambda Istanbul remains open.

In 2011, advocacy and support group SPoD was established. In 2018, the 6th İzmir Pride was held in Alsancak. Around 50,000 of LGBTQ members, allies, and human rights supporters participated at the Pride, walking along the waterfront street, Kordon. It started on Kıbrıs Şehitleri Avune and it ended in front of Türkan Saylan Cultural Center.

In April 2019, Ankara court lifted a ban on LGBTQ events in Turkey's capital. It is reported that it was Turkish LGBT+ rights group KAOS GL who managed to get it appealed after being unsuccessful the previous year.

In September 2022, thousands of anti-LGBTQ demonstrators marched in Istanbul, demanding the censoring of LGBTQ organizations and the banning of their activities. In 2026, LGBTQ rights activist Defne Güzel was charged with "violating public morality" after her organisation, 17 Mayıs Derneği, published documents about intersex people.

=== Istanbul Pride ===
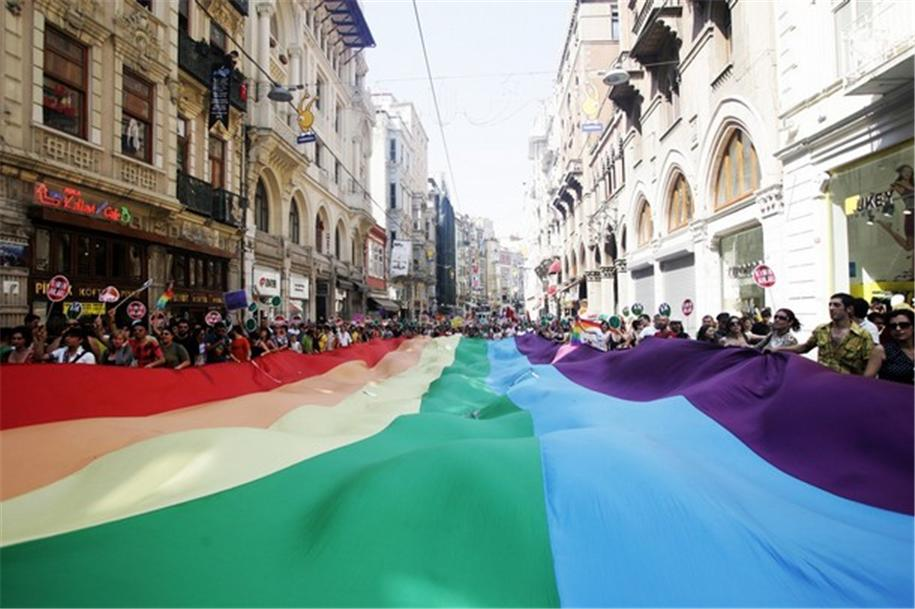
Gay Turks and human rights activists chanting slogans against the Turkish government's policies on İstiklal Avenue in Istanbul

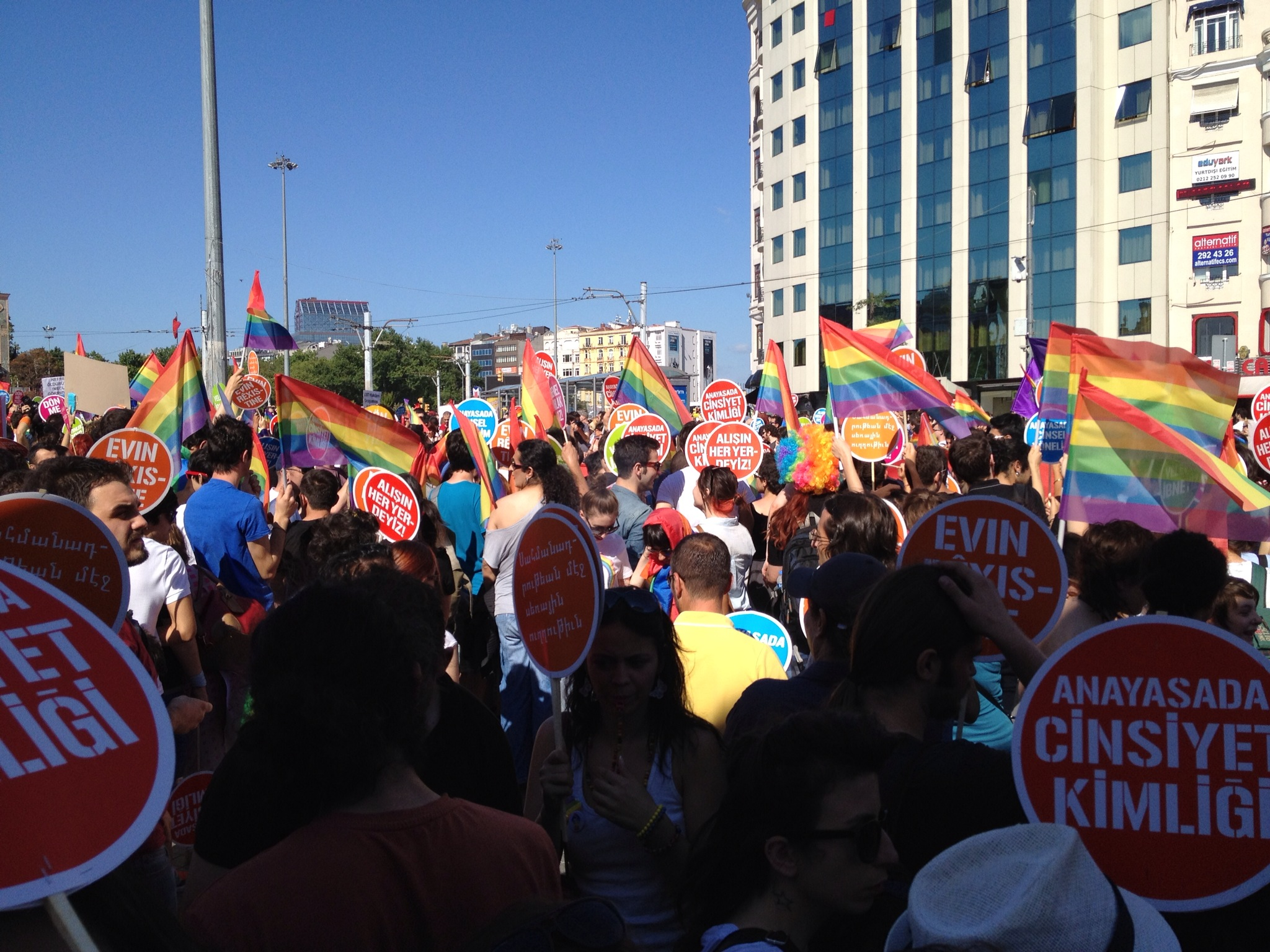
Istanbul Pride parade in 2012

Istanbul Pride is a gay pride march and LGBTQ demonstration held annually in Turkey's biggest city, Istanbul. The event first took place in 2003 and now occurs each year on either the last Sunday of June or the first Sunday of July, to mark the end of Istanbul pride week. About 30 people took part in the first Gay Pride Istanbul. The numbers have increased exponentially each year, reaching roughly 5,000 people by 2010. The 2011 gathering attracted over 10,000 people, therefore making Gay Pride Istanbul the biggest march of its kind in the Muslim World.

Participants assemble in Taksim Square before marching the entire length of İstiklal Avenue. This is a wide pedestrian boulevard and one of Istanbul's most important public spaces, the frequent home of bayram and regional festivals.

On 30 June 2013, the pride parade attracted almost 100,000 people. The protesters were joined by Gezi Park protesters, making the 2013 Istanbul Pride the biggest pride ever held in Turkey. The 2014 pride attracted more than 100,000 people. The European Union praised Turkey that the parade went ahead without disruption. On Sunday 29 June 2015, Reuters reported that Turkish police used a water cannon to disperse the gay pride parade.

In 2016, the pride march was banned by the local government "for the safety of our citizens, first and foremost the participants’, and for public order.". LGBTQ organizations have also not been allowed to make a press statement. The governorate of Istanbul once again claimed that a gathering of LGBTQ would not be allowed. "Within Law No: 5442, this request has not been approved due to the terror attacks that have taken place in our country and the area; because provocative acts and events may take place when the sensitivities that have emerged in society are taken into account; and because it may cause a disruption in public order and the people's- including the participants of the event- tranquility, security, and welfare."

In 2017 the Istanbul Governor's Office yet again banned the LGBTQ Pride Parade, citing security concerns and public order.

In 2018, for the fourth consecutive year the Istanbul Governor's Office yet again banned the LGBTQ Pride Parade, citing security concerns and public order, but around 1,000 people defied the ban, they were met with tear gas and rubber bullets. 11 participants were arrested.

In 2019, for the fifth consecutive year the Istanbul Governor's Office yet again banned the LGBTQ Pride Parade, citing security concerns and public order. subsequently, opposition Member of the Grand National Assembly Sezgin Tanrıkulu of the Republican People's Party (CHP) lodged a parliamentary question to the Vice President of Turkey Fuat Oktay asking why the deputy governor of Istanbul had banned Istanbul Pride. He also asked how many LGBTQ members had been killed in the last 17 years, the time the ruling party Justice and Development Party (AKP) ruled the city, due to provocative hate speech, and raised concerns over discrimination against the LGBTQ community. On 29 June, hundreds of people defied the ban, they were met with tear gas, shields, pepper gas and plastic bullets from the Police.

In June 2022, a small pride march was organized in Istanbul despite the ban. More than 360 people were subsequently arrested, according to the event's organizers.

=== March against Homophobia and Transphobia ===
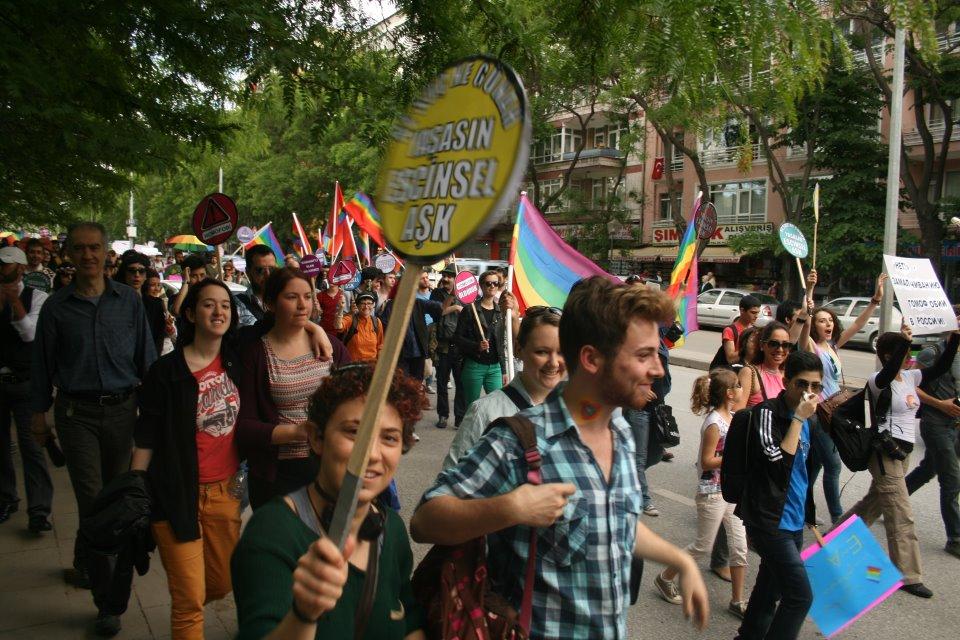
March against Homophobia and Transphobia in 2012, Kurtuluş Park, Ankara

The March against Homophobia and Transphobia (Turkish: Homofobi ve Transfobi Karşıtı Yürüyüş) is an LGBT pride parade and LGBTQ demonstration held annually in Turkey's capital, Ankara. The event first took place in 2003 and now occurs each year on either the last Sunday of June or the first Sunday of July, to mark the end of Ankara pride week.

Participants assemble in Cebeci. This is a wide pedestrianized boulevard and one of Ankara's most important public spaces, the frequent home of bayram and regional festivals.

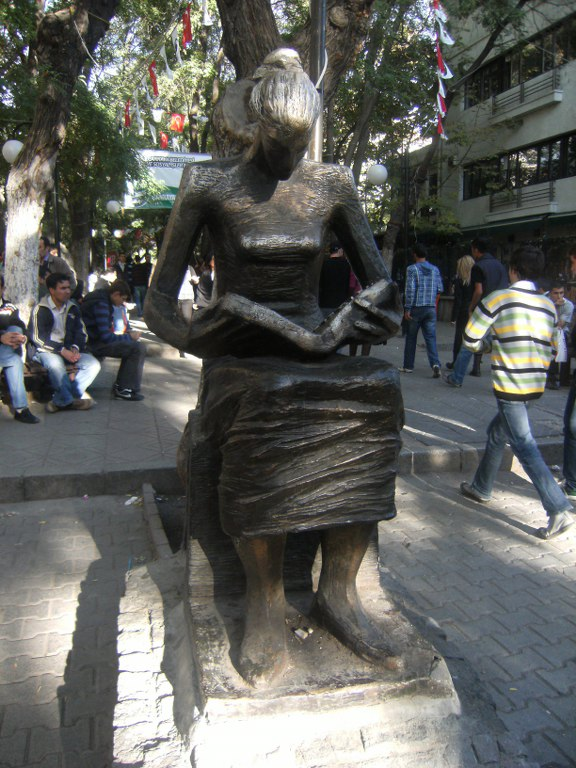
Human Rights Monument, Yüksel Street, Ankara

On 17 May 2008, the fifth International Day Against Homophobia, Kaos GL and Pink Life LGBTT Association jointly organised the first annual LGBT march in Ankara. Joined by British MEP Michael Cashman and Dutch feminist writer Anja Meulenbelt, over 100 gay men and women, bisexuals and transgender people assembled in front of the Human Rights Monument in Yüksel Street, marching towards the parliament. Police, outnumbering the demonstrators, stopped the march, demanding the rainbow flags and banners be taken down. Otherwise, the march proceeded.

In May 2009, Kaos GL organised the second annual march against homophobia and transphobia in Ankara. Around 300 people marched from Kurtuluş Park to the Human Rights Monument in Yüksel Street. The demonstration ended with a press statement, which called for the acknowledgement of lesbians, gays, bisexuals, transvestites and transsexuals (LGBTT).

Kaos GL has been organising international anti-homophobia meetings since May 2006. The Anti-Homophobia Meeting was first held as a four-day hall event in May 2006. In 2007, together with the central events, "Campus Meetings Against Homophobia" were realized in the three biggest university campuses of the capital, Ankara. The 4th annual meetings took place in six cities, from 1 May to 17 May 2009. The 4th International Anti-Homophobia Meeting started with the 1 May march in Ankara; and ended with the 17 May Anti-Homophobia March again in Ankara. Additional meeting took place also in the cities of Izmir, Eskisehir, Van, Diyarbakir and Istanbul together with Ankara.

=== University Organizations ===
The Lesbian and Gay Inter-University Organization (Turkish: Üniversitelerarası Lezbiyen ve Gey Topluluğu - LEGATO) was an LGBT organization in Turkey aimed at university students. The idea of bringing together homosexual university students began in 1996. By 2014 there were 5 groups: Bilgi Rainbow at Bilgi University, Bilkent Renkli Düşün at Bilkent University, Lion Queer at Galatasaray University, and the Queer Studies Society at Hacettepe University.

== Summary table ==
Same-sex sexual activity decriminalized	Yes (Since 1858)
Equal age of consent (18)	Yes (Since 1858)
Anti-discrimination laws in employment	(Since 2018) The Court of Cassation directly offers practices against workplace discrimination
Anti-discrimination laws in the provision of goods and services	No
Anti-discrimination laws in education	No
Anti-discrimination laws in all other areas (incl. indirect discrimination, hate speech)	
Hate crime laws include sexual orientation and gender identity	No
Same-sex marriages	No
Same-sex civil unions	No
Recognition of same-sex couples	No
Step-child adoption by same-sex couples	No
Joint adoption by same-sex couples	No
Adoption by single individuals regardless of sexual orientation	Yes
Conversion therapy banned	/ No Not explicitly banned by law. However, certified mental health professionals (psychiatrists and psychologists) are ethically and professionally prohibited from conducting conversion therapy by major national bodies like the Psychiatric Association of Turkey. Despite this, unlicensed or underground religious organizations are reported to perform these practices clandestinely
Gays and lesbians allowed to serve openly in the military	No
Right to change legal gender	Yes (Since 1988, with sex reassignment surgery, medical examination and court permission)
Access to IVF for lesbians	No
Commercial surrogacy for gay male couples	No (Banned for all couples)
MSMs allowed to donate blood	No

== See also ==
- LGBTQ rights in Europe
- LGBTQ rights in Asia
- LGBTQ rights in Northern Cyprus
- Human rights in Turkey
- Accession of Turkey to the European Union
- Hande Kader
