= Istanbul Pride =

Annual LGBT event in Istanbul, Turkey

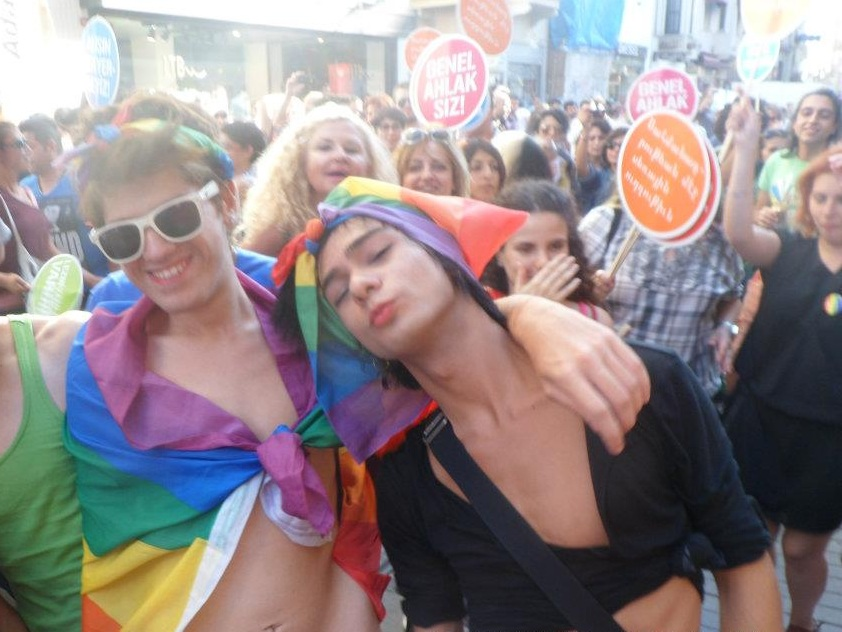
LGBT pride parade on May 29, 2012, İstiklal Avenue, Istanbul.

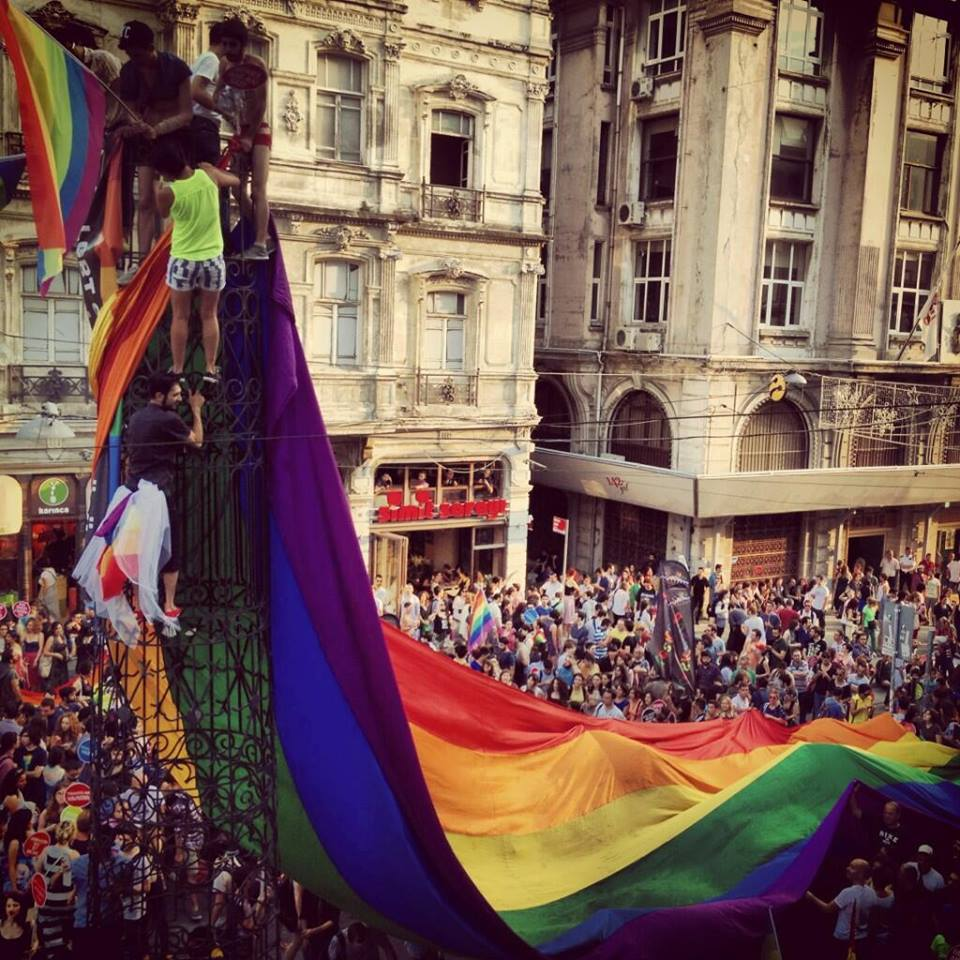
Istanbul LGBT pride parade in 2013, İstiklal Avenue, Istanbul.

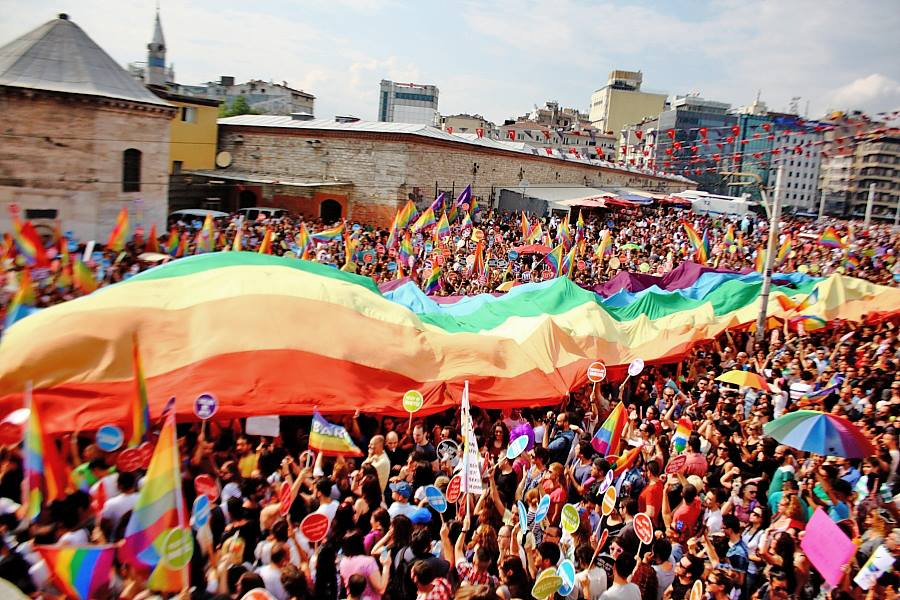
Istanbul Pride

Istanbul Pride (Turkish: İstanbul Onur Yürüyüşü) is a pride parade and LGBTQ demonstration held annually in Turkey's biggest city, Istanbul since 2003. Participants assemble in Taksim Square before marching the entire length of İstiklal Avenue. It has been described as the first and biggest LGBT event in Muslim-majority countries.

The event reached roughly 5,000 people by 2010. In 2013, the pride parade, with the attendance of Gezi Park protesters attracted almost 100,000 people. The 2014 Pride was the biggest LGBT event in Turkey's history and attracted more than 100,000 people.

Since 2015 pride parades in Istanbul have been denied permission by the Governorship of Istanbul authorities. The governors repeatedly stated that the denials were based on security concerns and public order, but critics claimed the bans were taken on a religious and ideological basis. Despite the refusal, hundreds of people defy the ban each year, resulting in law enforcement intervention.

Politicians that have joined Istanbul Pride are mainly from the opposition parties Republican People's Party (CHP), Peoples' Democratic Party (HDP) and Worker's Party of Turkey (TİP).

== History ==
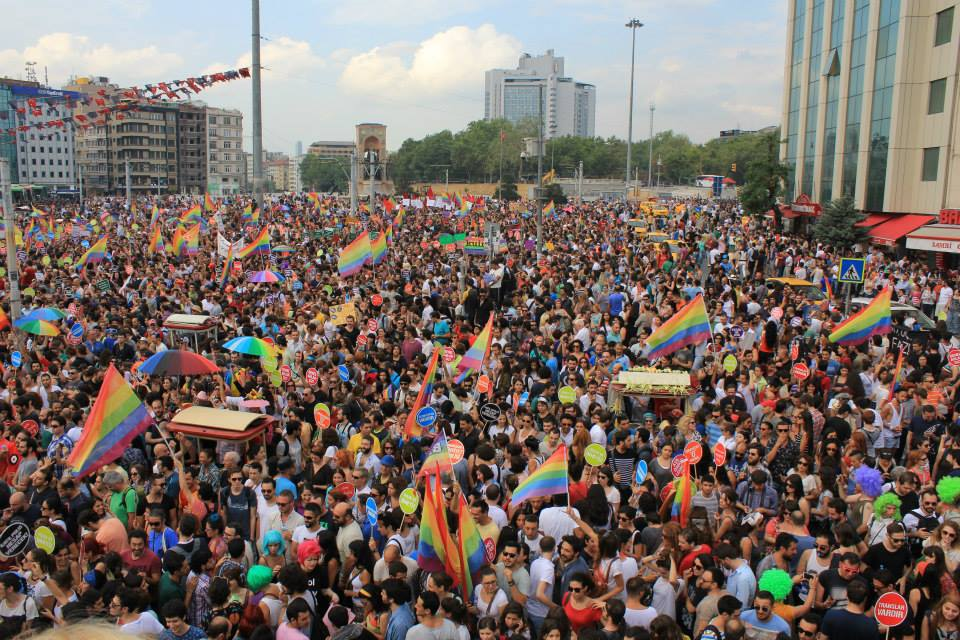
Istanbul LGBT pride parade in 2011, İstiklal Avenue, Istanbul.

The event first took place in 2003 and now occurs each year on either the last Sunday of June or the first Sunday of July, to mark the end of Istanbul pride week. About 30 people took part in the first Gay Pride Istanbul. The numbers increased each year, reaching roughly 5,000 people by 2010. The 2011 gathering attracted over 10,000 people, therefore making Gay Pride Istanbul the biggest march of its kind in the Muslim majority countries. The 2012 pride march, which took place on 1 July, attracted between 10,000 and 30,000 people.

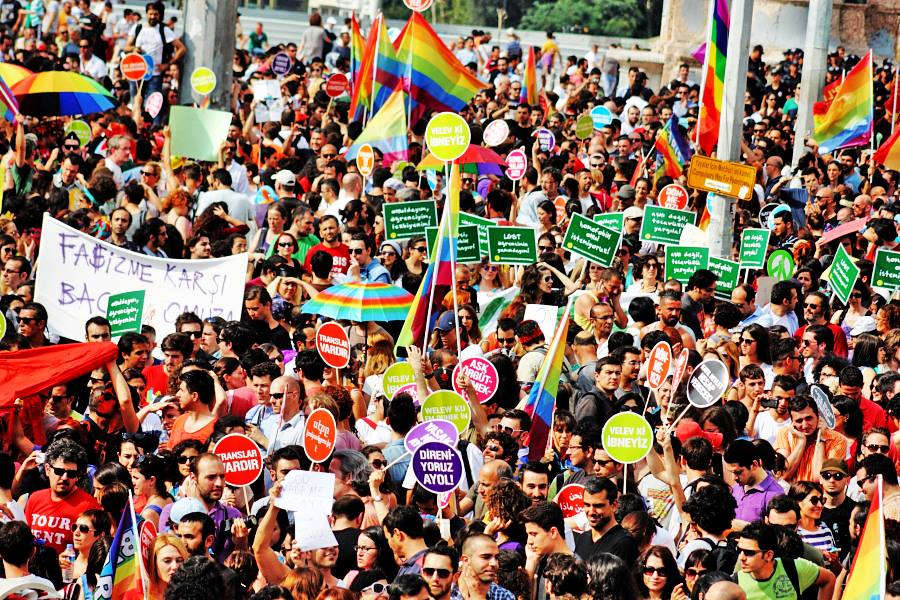
Istanbul LGBT pride parade in 2013, Taksim Square, Istanbul.

In 2013, the pride parade attracted almost 100,000 people. The protesters were joined by Gezi Park protesters, making the 2013 Istanbul Pride the biggest pride ever held in Turkey. The 2014 pride attracted more than 100,000 people. The European Union praised Turkey that the parade went ahead without disruption.

=== Suppression since 2015 ===
On Sunday 29 June 2015, Reuters reported that Turkish police used a water cannon to disperse the gay pride parade. In 2016 the pride march was banned by the local government "for the safety of our citizens, first and foremost the participants’, and for public order." LGBT organizations have also not been allowed to make a press statement. The governate of Istanbul once again claimed that a gathering of LGBT would not be allowed. "Within Law No: 5442, this request has not been approved due to the terror attacks that have taken place in our country and the area; because provocative acts and events may take place when the sensitivities that have emerged in society are taken into account; and because it may cause a disruption in public order and the people's- including the participants of the event- tranquility, security, and welfare.". Supporters of the Pride claimed this decision was religiously motivated and the event was banned because it would have take during the Muslim holy month of Ramadan.

In 2017 the Istanbul Governor's Office yet again banned the LGBT Pride Parade, citing security concerns and public order.

In 2018, for the fourth consecutive year the Istanbul Governor's Office yet again banned the LGBT Pride Parade, citing security concerns and public order, but around 1,000 people defied the ban, they were met with tear gas and rubber bullets. 11 participants were arrested.

In 2019, the Istanbul Governor's Office yet again banned the LGBT Pride Parade, citing security concerns and public order. subsequently, opposition Member of the Grand National Assembly Sezgin Tanrıkulu of the Republican People's Party (CHP) lodged a parliamentary question to the Vice President of Turkey Fuat Oktay asking why the deputy governor of Istanbul had banned Istanbul Pride. He also asked how many LGBT members had been killed in the last 17 years, the time the ruling party Justice and Development Party (AKP) ruled the city, due to provocative hate speech, and raised concerns over discrimination against the LGBT community. On 29 June, hundreds of people defied the ban, they were met with tear gas, shields, pepper gas and plastic bullets from the Police.

Due to the COVID-19 pandemic, Istanbul Pride was held online in 2020. Some activists gathered in person at Mis Sokak, which had been the finale of the 2003 parade.

The trend of suppression has continued. Blockades and tear gas were used in 2021 and 25 people were arrested. in 2022, 373 were arrested. In addition to blockades, public transportation to Taksim square was shut down. Starting with 2023, and again in 2024, Istanbul Pride was held in non-Taksim square public spaces, and fake meeting calls were announced prior to thwart law enforcement. Despite these efforts, 2023 had 113 arrests, while 2024 had 11 arrests, three of whom were minors.

=== Media Coverage ===
Pride events are currently and openly supported by Turkey's current Newspaper of Record, Cumhuriyet, and were previously supported by former NoR Hürriyet. In addition to straight news reporting, these outlets have published opinion pieces, photo galleries, and editorials addressing both the events themselves and broader issues affecting the LGBT community in Turkey. Other newspapers and media organizations with similar editorial positions have likewise provided consistent coverage and public visibility for Pride marches.

On television, while mainstream media has often maintained a cautious or distant stance toward LGBT-related issues, channels such as CNN Türk and NTV have historically reported on Istanbul Pride and Pride marches around the world, particularly during periods when such events were held without official bans. Coverage has included live reporting, interviews, and visual documentation of marches and police interventions. However, following democratic backsliding in Turkey and the acquisition of many major media outlets by groups perceived as close to the Erdoğan administration, open and sustained coverage of Pride events has become more limited, with only a small number of media organizations continuing to report on them prominently, including coverage of police measures and event restrictions such as the closure of transportation access ahead of marches.

== Political impact ==
Politicians that have joined Istanbul Pride are mainly from the opposition parties HDP, CHP, TİP and include:

- Filiz Kerestecioğlu
- Ertuğrul Kürkçü
- Melda Onur
- Sırrı Süreyya Önder
- Mahmut Tanal
- Sebahat Tuncel
- Özgül Saki
- Kezban Konukçu
- Ahmet Şık

They call upon the Turkish authorities to guarantee fundamental rights and civil liberties to all LGBT people.

In 2019, several opposition held municipalities have shown support to the LGBTI community on social media. Mersin, Edirne, Tarsus, Eskişehir, İzmir, Bodrum. Istanbul's local governments such as Ataşehir, Beşiktaş, Şişli, Kadıköy, Maltepe, Kartal also showed their sympathy.

In 2019, shortly after the 2019 Turkish local elections opposition politician and Mayor of Istanbul Ekrem İmamoğlu stated that the ban cannot be reversed as the right to give permission to demonstrations lies with the governorship and the governors of Turkish provinces are not elected but directly appointed by the presidency.

== See also ==
- LGBT culture in Istanbul
- LGBT rights in Turkey
- Bigudi Club, lesbian and queer nightclub and bar in Istanbul
