= Halil İbrahim Dinçdağ =

Turkish professional athlete

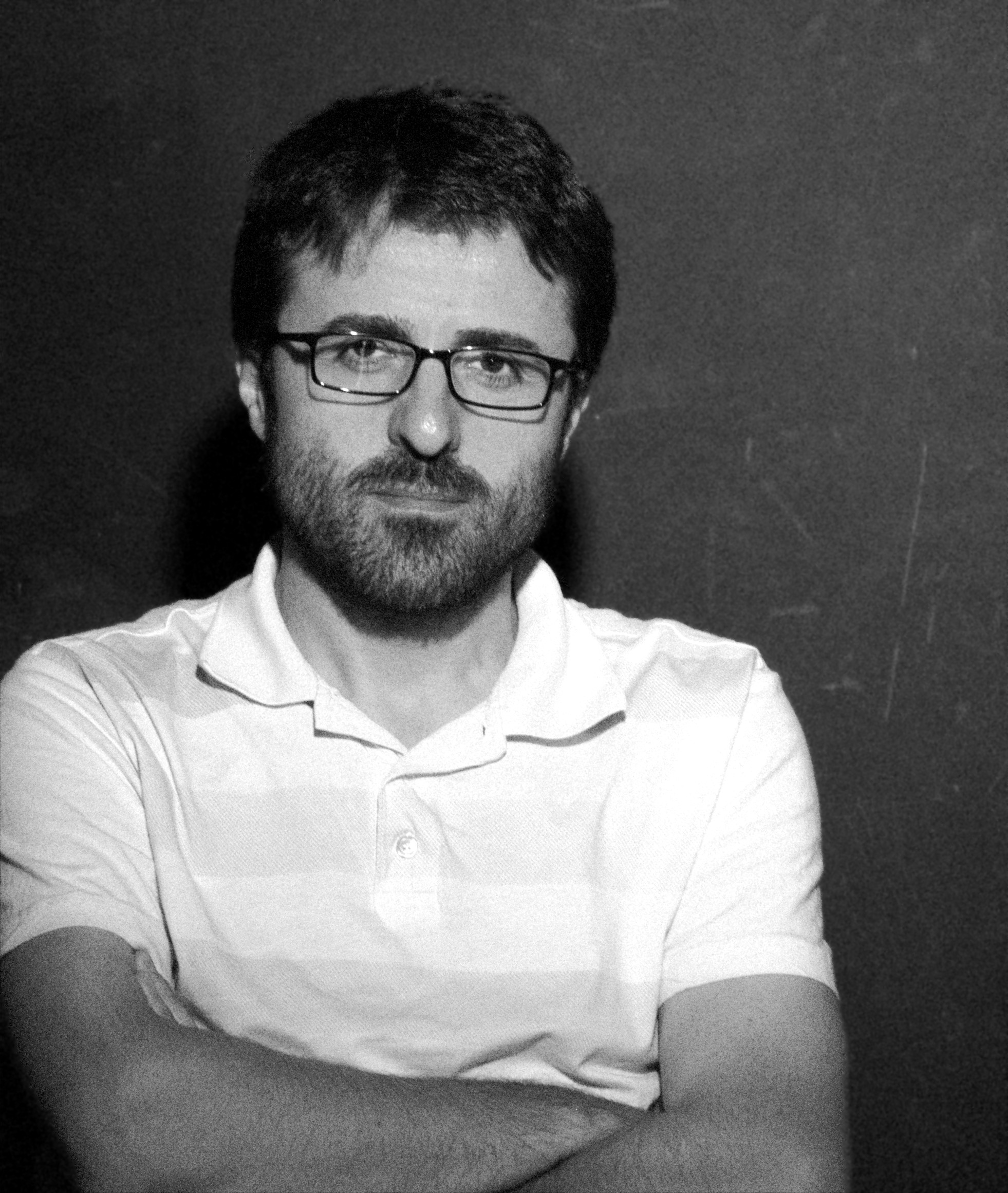
Halil İbrahim Dinçdağ (June 2015)

Halil İbrahim Dinçdağ (born 1976) is a Turkish professional athlete who was suspended because of his sexuality.

Dinçdağ had been a football referee in Trabzon for 13 years in 2009 when he was informed that his referee's license would not be renewed. Two days after, he made an appeal against this decision, articles claiming he was gay appeared in the press. He was promptly sacked from his position at a local radio station, and he went to Istanbul to avoid intrusions into his personal life by reporters.

On 30 December 2015, the Turkish Football Federation (TFF) was fined ₺23,000 in compensation after Dinçdağ won a discrimination case against them.
