= Public morality =

Differentiating wrong and right as applied to the people

Public morality refers to moral and ethical standards enforced in a society, by law or police work or social pressure, and applied to public life, to the content of the media, and to conduct in public places.

== Overview ==
Public morality often means regulation of sexual matters, including prostitution and homosexuality, but also matters of dress and nudity, pornography, acceptability in social terms of cohabitation before marriage, and the protection of children. It is a main justification for censorship; it can lead to campaigns against profanity, and so be at odds with freedom of speech. Gambling is generally controlled: casinos have been considered much more of a threat than large-scale lotteries or football pools. Public drunkenness is quite unacceptable in some societies, and legal control of consumption of alcohol is often justified in terms of public morality, just as much as for medical reasons or to limit alcohol-related crime. Drug legislation, historically speaking, has sometimes followed on similar reasoning. Abortion is sometimes treated as an aspect of public morality, even if it is legally defined, regulated by medical professionals, and almost entirely hidden from public view. AIDS as a health policy issue is linked to public morality in a complicated manner. A famous remark on male homosexuality of Mrs Patrick Campbell, that she did not care what people did as long as they "didn't frighten the horses", shows that in some sense even high tolerance expects a public limitation on behaviour. At the opposite extreme a theocracy may equate public morality with religious instruction, and give both the equal force of law.

Views on public morality do change over time. Public views on which things are acceptable often move towards wider tolerance. Rapid shifts the other way are often characterised by moral panics, as in the shutting down of theatres a generation after Shakespeare's death by the English Puritans.

It may also be applied to the morals of public life. Political corruption, or the telling of lies in public statements, tarnish not only individual politicians, but the entire conduct of political life, whether at local or national level. These are fairly universally regarded as blots on reputations, though in some cases there is a grey area between corruption and legitimate fund-raising. Whether the private lives of politicians are a public morals issue is not a matter of agreement, internationally speaking; the existence of an extramarital relationship of a prime minister or even a president would in some countries be considered a revelation well within the sphere of the public interest, while in other countries it would be considered quite irrelevant.

== See also ==
- Family values
- Islamic religious police
- Moral panic
- Morality
- Public-order crime
- Social conservatism
- Victorian morality
