= LGBTQ culture in India =

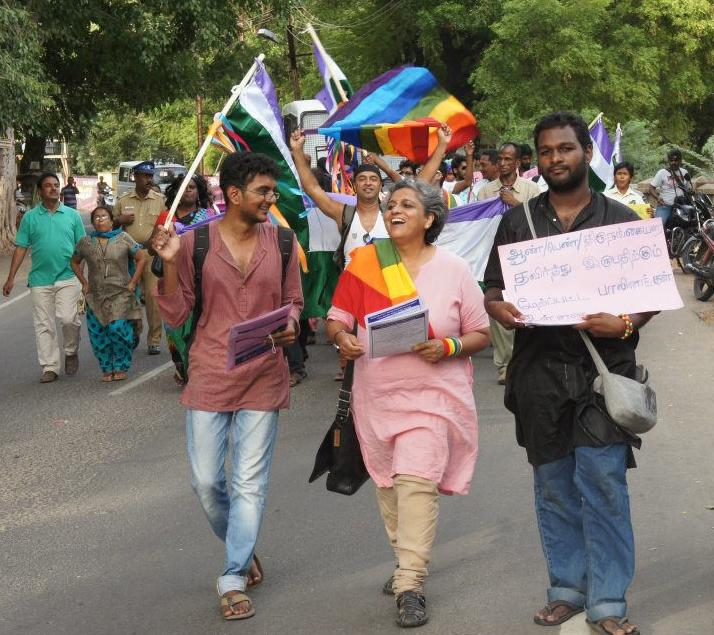
Asia's first Genderqueer Pride Parade at Madurai with Gopi Shankar Madurai and Anjali Gopalan.

Unofficial pride flag representing the LGBT community of India

India has a long and ancient tradition of culture associated with the LGBTQ community, with many aspects that differ markedly from modern liberal western culture.

India's LGBTQ culture has recently progressed in its cities due to the growing acceptance of the LGBTQ community in urban India in the 21st century.

== Sexuality in pre-modern India ==
Homosexuality has been referenced in numerous artworks and literary works throughout the subcontinent since ancient times. Early neutral or positive references to homosexuality and transsexuality include medical journals such as the Nāradasmṛti and moral legal codes such as the Pali Cannon. Apart from the north western fringes of the Indian subcontinent where Zostaraianism and Islam took ahold from the BCE, homophobia was slowly introduced to the subcontinent during the medieval period from the west through Islamic empires and encompassed the subconitnent with the advent colonialism and the British Raj.

Throughout Hindu and Vedic texts there are many descriptions of saints, demigods, and even the Supreme Lord transcending gender norms and manifesting multiple combinations of sex and gender. Apart from male and female, there are more than 20 types of genders, such as trans woman, trans men, androgynous and pangender etc. Trans people were accepted in ancient India and referred to by terms like "tritya prakriti", "kliba" and "napunsaka". Ancient writings in both Buddhist and Hindu texts found throughout South Asia and East Asia refer to two types of tritiya-prakriti (literally third gender): Narshanda are male to female transgender people; Narishanda are female to male transgender people.

"Hindu society had a clear cut idea of all these people in the past. Now that we have put them under one label 'LGBT', there is lot more confusion and other identities have got hidden."

— Gopi Shankar Madurai at National Queer Conference 2013

Alka Pande says that alternate sexuality was an integral part of ancient India and homosexuality was considered to be a form of the sacred, drawing upon the examples of the hermaphrodite Shikhandi and Arjuna who became a eunuch. Ruth Vanita argues that ancient India was relatively tolerant and views on it were ambiguous, from acceptance to rejection.

Some Hindu texts mention homosexuality and support them. The Kamasutra mentions homosexuality as a type of sexual pleasure. There are also legends of Hindu gods change gender or are hermaphrodites and engage in relations that would be considered homoerotic in the other case. Though, it also forbids the educated Brahmins, bureaucrats and wisemen from practicing Auparishtaka or oral sex. Homosexuality was also practiced in the royal families especially with servants. Kamasutra also mentions the "svairini" who used to live by herself or with another woman. The king Bhagiratha is described as being born of sexual union of two queens of the king Dilip, however there is also a patriarchal background represented as the king left no heir and his younger wife took on the role of a man.

Ayoni or non-vaginal sex of all types are punishable in the Arthashastra. Homosexual acts are however treated as a smaller offence punishable by a fine while unlawful heterosexual sex have much harsher punishment. The Dharmsastras especially the later ones prescribed against non-vaginal sex like the Vashistha Dharmasutra. The Yājñavalkya Smṛti prescribes fines for such acts including those with other men. Manusmriti prescribes light punishments for such acts. Vanita states that the verses about punishment for a sex between female and a maiden is due to its strong emphasis on a maiden's sexual purity.

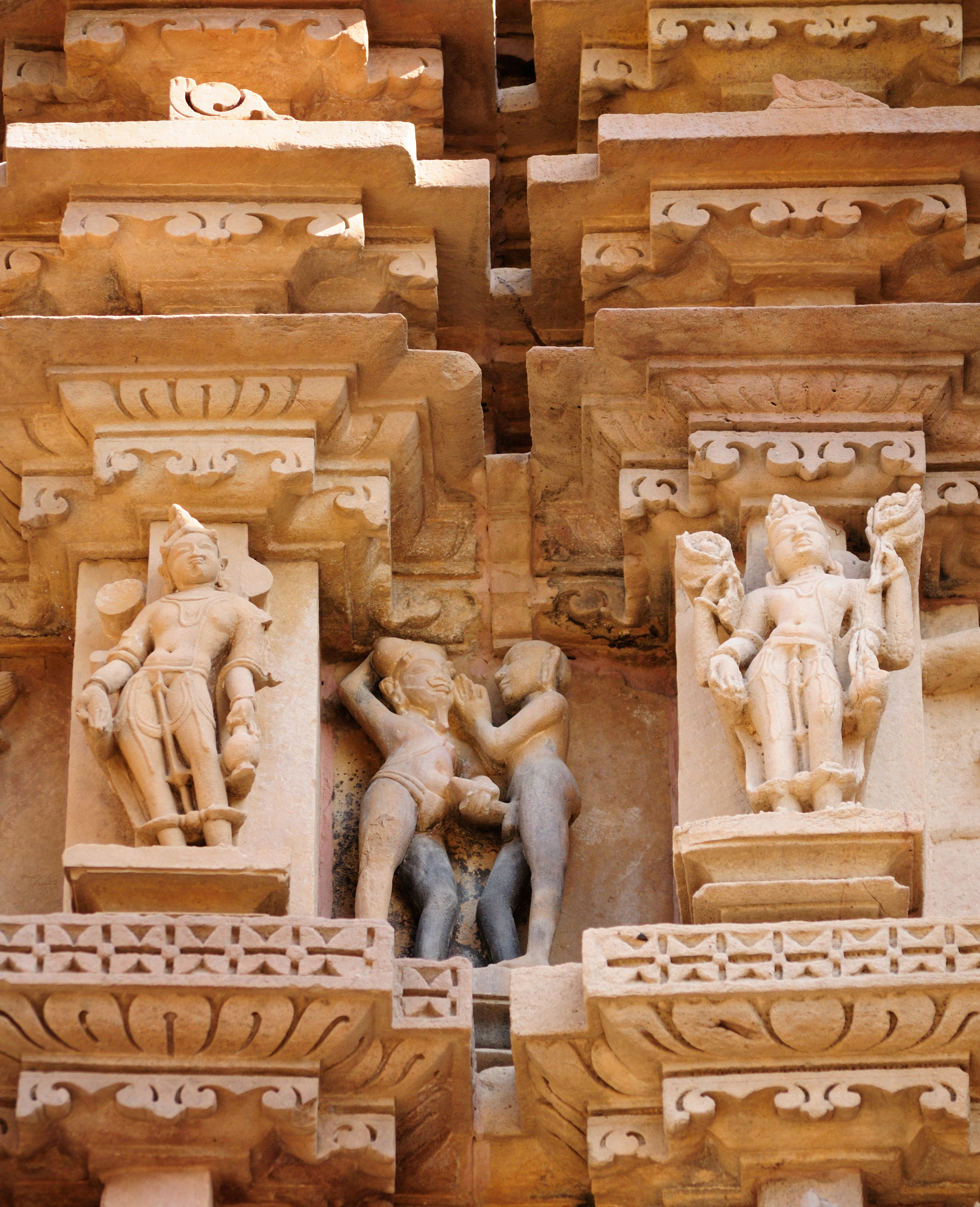
Erotic sculptures of two men (centre) at the Khajuraho temples.

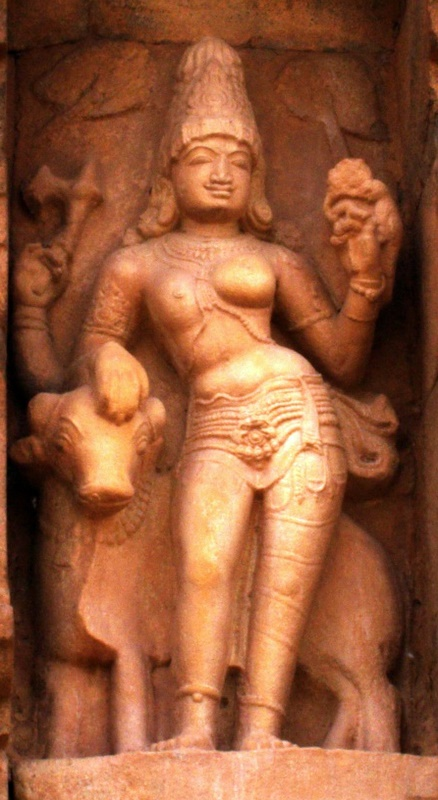
Ardhanariswara from Gangaikondacholapuram

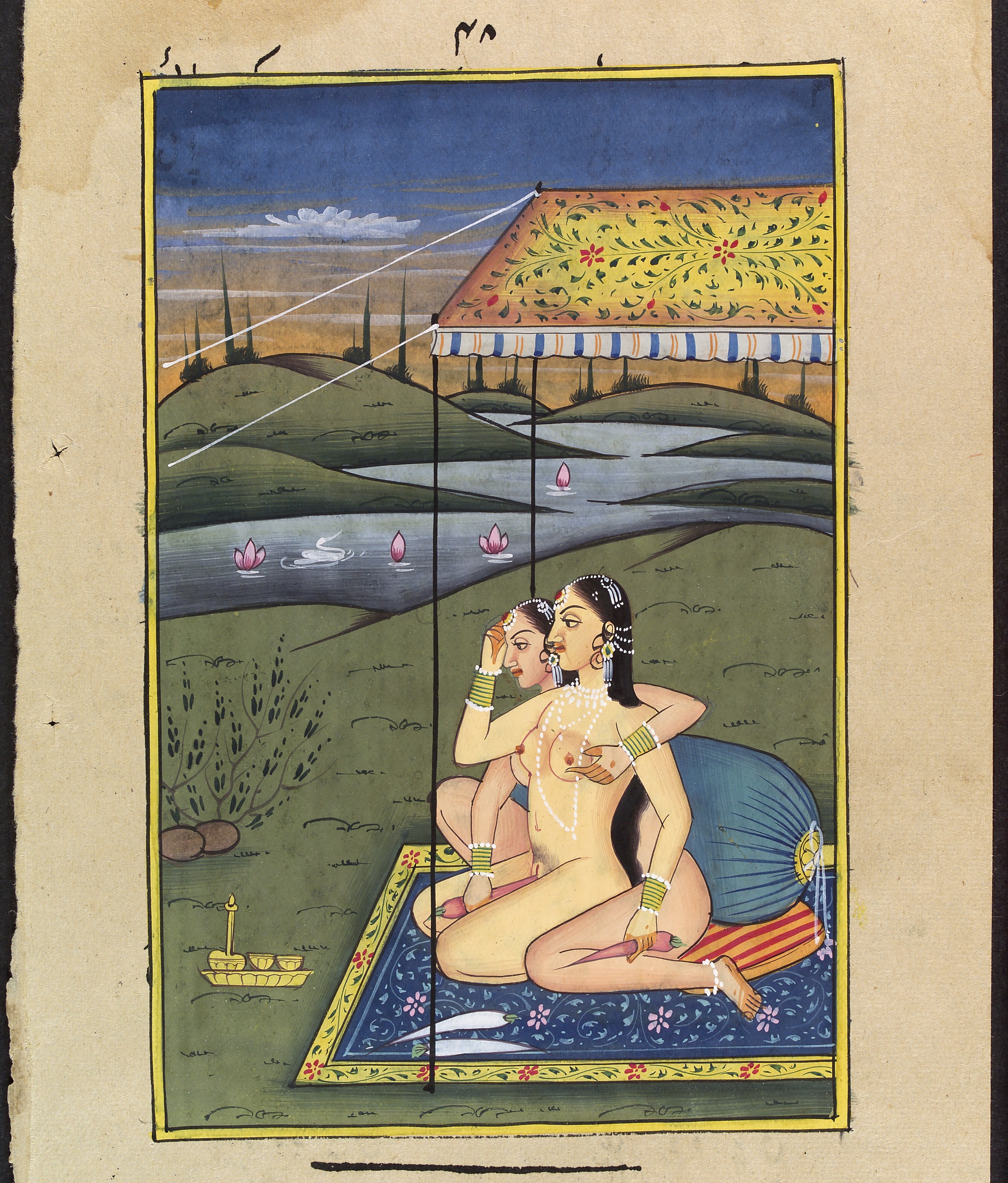
Two women using carrots as dildos, 20th century gouache painting.

== Media representation ==
=== Social media ===
Urban centers are important hubs of the LGBTQ+ movement. In India, city hubs have helped the community gained visibility since the 1970s. Since the early 2000s, social media and online venues have played a critical role in strengthening LGBTQ+ communities and identities in these cities.

The internet has created new spaces for social interaction and community formation. Social media platforms such as Instagram, Twitter and Facebook have been used to create pages and posts that increase queer awareness and visibility in India. Some examples are Instagram profiles "Gaysifamily", "nazariyalgbt", and "lgbthistoryindia". The Gaysifamily website describes their mission "to provide a voice and a safe space to Desis from the South Asian subcontinent that identify as LGBTQ+". They sell and share stickers, artwork, personal stories and zines made by queer Indians.

Social media platforms are also important for the development of intimate relationships between queer people in India.

Even before social media became a platform for queer visibility, the internet created possibilities for communication and community building in the LGBTQ+ community. Khush-list, the first mailing list for LGBT South Asians, predominantly Indians in metropolitan cities and those living abroad, was established in 1993. In 1999, LGBT-India was established on egroups, and later transitioned to yahoogroups. Such mailing lists, established well before the advent of social networking sites, continue to remain the mainstay for discussion among middle-class, English-speaking Indians, and include LGBT-India, GayBombay, Good As You (Bangalore), Pratibimb (Hyderabad), and Movenpick/Orinam (Chennai). GayBombay.org (established in late 1998) and Orinam.net (established in 2006) are among the oldest websites that function as online resources catering to a local (Mumbai and Chennai, respectively) and national readership. Dating websites provide an alternative way for meeting people; online communities also offer a safe and convenient environment for meeting gays in India. Online magazines like Pink Pages and Gaylaxy also publish regular issues.

=== Radio ===
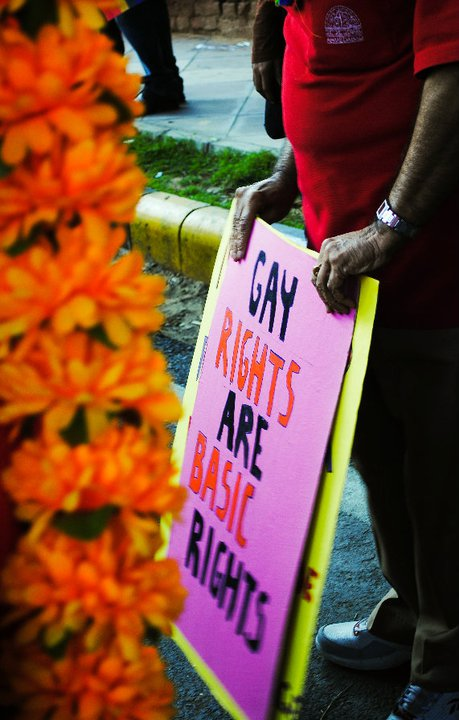
Delhi Queer Pride poster

On 11 September 2013, India's first Queer Radio channel, Qradio - Out and Proud, completely dedicated to LGBT audience was launched . With variety of talk shows, music, debates etc., the channel now runs 24 hours a day

In February 2014, "Wonderful Things Happen" was founded with the objective to serve the Indian lesbian/bi women community.

=== Film and Television Depictions ===
Though Bollywood has gay and transsexual characters, they have been primarily ridiculed or abused. There are few positive portrayals of late like Onir's My Brother Nikhil, Reema Kagti's Honeymoon Travels Pvt. Ltd., and Parvati Balagopalan's Rules: Pyaar Ka Superhit Formula but they have been sporadic and not mainstream. Shelly Chopra Dhar's Ek Ladki Ko Dekha Toh Aisa Laga was perhaps the first mainstream explicitly lesbian romance in Bollywood history after Fire (1997). There also been a few independent films that deal with homosexuality like Sridhar Rangayan's Gulabi Aaina – The Pink Mirror, Girlfriend, Yours Emotionally, 68 Pages, Sudhanshu Saria's Loev (2015) and Ashish Sawhney's Happy Hookers. The first Indian film to deal openly with homosexual relations was Fire by Indian-Canadian director Deepa Mehta. With its 1997 release in India, it stirred up a heated controversy throughout the country.

In 2004 The Journey Malayalam feature film written, directed and produced by Ligy J. Pullappally, inspired both by her short film Uli and a true story of two lesbian lovers in the South Indian state of Kerala was released. Fire is explicit in stating that the main characters enter their relationship due to the failure of their heterosexual marriages but The Journey is a film about two lesbians who fall in love with each other.

Recently, Bollywood has portrayed homosexual relationships in a better light, such as in Dostana, Men Not Allowed and Ek Ladki Ko Dekha Toh Aisa Laga, Badhaai Do. Actors of Indian descent have played homosexual roles in foreign movies. Lisa Ray and Sheetal Sheth played gay roles opposite each other in Shamim Sarif's I Can't Think Straight and The World Unseen. Jimi Mistry played a man trying to come out to his mother in Ian Iqbal Rashid's Touch of Pink.

In 2010, a Tamil film, Goa, dealt with gay couples, their love and romance. In 2016, Aligarh, was released centering on the life of a gay professor who was accused of homosexuality. The release of Ek Ladki Ko Dekha Toh Aisa Laga in 2019 was a landmark in LGBT representation in media. The character of Sweety played by actress Sonam Kapoor is a lesbian and is shown to be in a relationship with Kuhu (played by Regena Cassandrra). The film mainly focuses on coming out to an Indian conservative family and throws light on the struggles of a young gay teenager and the insecurities they carry well into adulthood.

Indian television has also begun to depict gay characters. In 2011, the popular soap opera Maryada: Lekin Kab Tak? ( English: Honour: But at What Cost?) featured a plotline involving a gay couple, and was among a handful of television shows including gay characters.

==== Portrayal of Homosexuality in Bollywood and Indian Cinema ====
Bollywood and Indian cinema are not new in portraying homosexual characters on the screen; this is often done in satirical, comical, or stereotypical ways. Many contemporary Bollywood films, such as Shubh Mangal Zyada Saavdhan, Kal Ho Naa Ho, Dostana, Kapoor & Sons, Ek Ladki Ko Dekha Toh Aisa Laga, Badhaai Do and Aligarh, either have homosexual characters or portrayals of homosexual relationships. Going back to the 90's, homosexuality has been portrayed in cinema. Fire is one of the prominent examples of it.

Some critics argue that same-sex friendship within Bollywood movies is portrayed for a "gay viewership".The use of terms such as "yaar" (friend/lover) can be seen as a way to deter from using the language of "homosexuality" or "gayness".

In recent movies, there has been a move away from the portrayal of homosexuality in a satirical and comedic way, and instead of showing a more sensitive, and empathic representation of the struggles that the community has to face. Aligarh and Kapoor & Sons are two of the more recent blockbuster Bollywood movies, both released in 2016, that have made an impact on the portrayal of homosexual men in Indian media. Ek Ladki Ko Dekha Toh Aisa Laga has shown that there are major strides taken in the positive portrayal of homosexuality in cinema. These movies are turning a new page for the role of homosexuality in Bollywood by challenging the previous stereotypical roles portrayed on screen. This is achieved by portraying homosexuality in a new, more truthful and complex light than has been done previously. Manipuri actor and filmmaker Priyakanta Laishram's 2022 movie ONENESS is the first gay-themed movie of Manipur, Northeast India.

==== Indian Queer Film Festivals ====
Other than specific Bollywood films that showcase homosexual characters or relationships, Indian cinema in general has been branching out; one way is through queer film festivals that are held in India.

KASHISH Mumbai International Queer Film Festival is one way through which film is urging for change in the way that the Indian community views homosexuality. The festival includes films from around the world, including Indian queer films.

Bangalore Queer Film Festival is another film festival that has been running since 2008. The festival showcases both Indian and international films. The festival also seeks to voice concerns and issues that the LGBT community faces. In 2017, the festival featured 55 films from 21 countries.

Chennai International Queer Film Festival, also known as Reel Desires: Chennai International Queer Film Festival, is a three-day event that usually takes places on the last weekend of July. It main organisers are Orinam in partnership with Goethe-Institut, Chennai along with volunteers from various community groups and NGOs, including Nirangal, East-West Center for Counselling, RIOV, and SAATHII. They screen short films as well as Feature-length films from all over the world. The last day is usually performances along with a panel discussion, usually to discuss and bring out the challenges faced by community members. In 2014, the event had a photography exhibition, featuring queer/trans photography Shilpa Raj.

Calcutta International LGBT Film & Video Festival, also known as DIALOGUES: Calcutta International LGBT Film & Video Festival, was first launched in 2007. It's a three-day festival that happens in the November each year. This Film Festival was started by 'Sappho For Equality' and 'Pratyay Gender Trust', along with Goethe-Institut /Max Mueller Bhavan, Kolkata.

Delhi International Queer Theater and Film Festival is organised in Delhi by Harmless Hugs. There has been three consistent editions of this festival since 2015.

=== Celebrity Support to Decriminalize Homosexuality ===
Celebrities, represented in the general Indian media, have voiced their opinions and have advocated for the LGBTQ community in the country.

After the 2013 Supreme Court decision to reinstate S.377, the court agreed to refer the case to a five-judge constitutional bench based on a curative petition. Many celebrities have voiced their support for the curative petition and the decriminalization of homosexuality by repealing S.377. A news article by Akshay Kaushal in the Hindustan Times (3 February 2016), outlines some of these public comments; this includes Onir, one of the few openly gay film directors, stated, "Now hopefully the five-judge constitution bench will take the decision in our favour. And this law should have been scrapped the day the Britishers left India. So hopefully, the 2009 verdict of the Delhi Court, that decriminalized gay sex among consenting adults, will be back soon." Delhi-based fashion designer, who married his partner Rahul Arora, stated, "I am hopeful and positive that the five-judge constitution bench will scrap section 377 and make this country a better place for us to live." National Award-winning filmmaker Apurva Asrani, who wrote the film Aligarh, when referring to the five-judge constitutional bench, stated, "The Supreme Court has allowed itself a chance to redeem itself from a blemish on its otherwise spotless image." "This (homosexuality) has been accepted even in our Hindu scriptures. I stand by my gay friends," said actor Raveena Tandon. "Today’s decision is a great step. However, I think a disparity that can easily be addressed by amending the Indian Penal Code shouldn’t have to be a 15-year-long struggle," said actor and gay rights activist Celina Jaitley.

Along with the curative petition submitted by NGOs to the Supreme Court of India, leading to the five-judge constitutional bench reconsidering the repeal of section 377, a petition was filed by five gay celebrities.

The petition was covered by various news articles, including The Times of India, stating, "The petitioners are lesbian, gay and bisexual (LGBT) citizens of India whose rights to sexuality, sexual autonomy, choice of sexual partner, life, privacy, dignity and equality, along with the other fundamental rights guaranteed under Part-III of Constitution, are violated by Section 377." This is the first time those that are directly affected by the 2013 decision have addressed the court in this manner. The petitioners are NS Johar (dancer), Sunil Mehra (journalist), Ritu Dalmia (chef), Aman Nath (hotelier), and Ayesha Kapoor (business executive).The petition was not reviewed or added by the Supreme Court, stating that there are already petitions of the same nature that the court is reviewing at the moment, and advised the celebrities to wait until the decision is out before further pursuing this issue.

In 2019, Narthaki Nataraj, a Bharatanatyam dancer, became the first trans person to receive the prestigious Padma Shri.

== Events ==
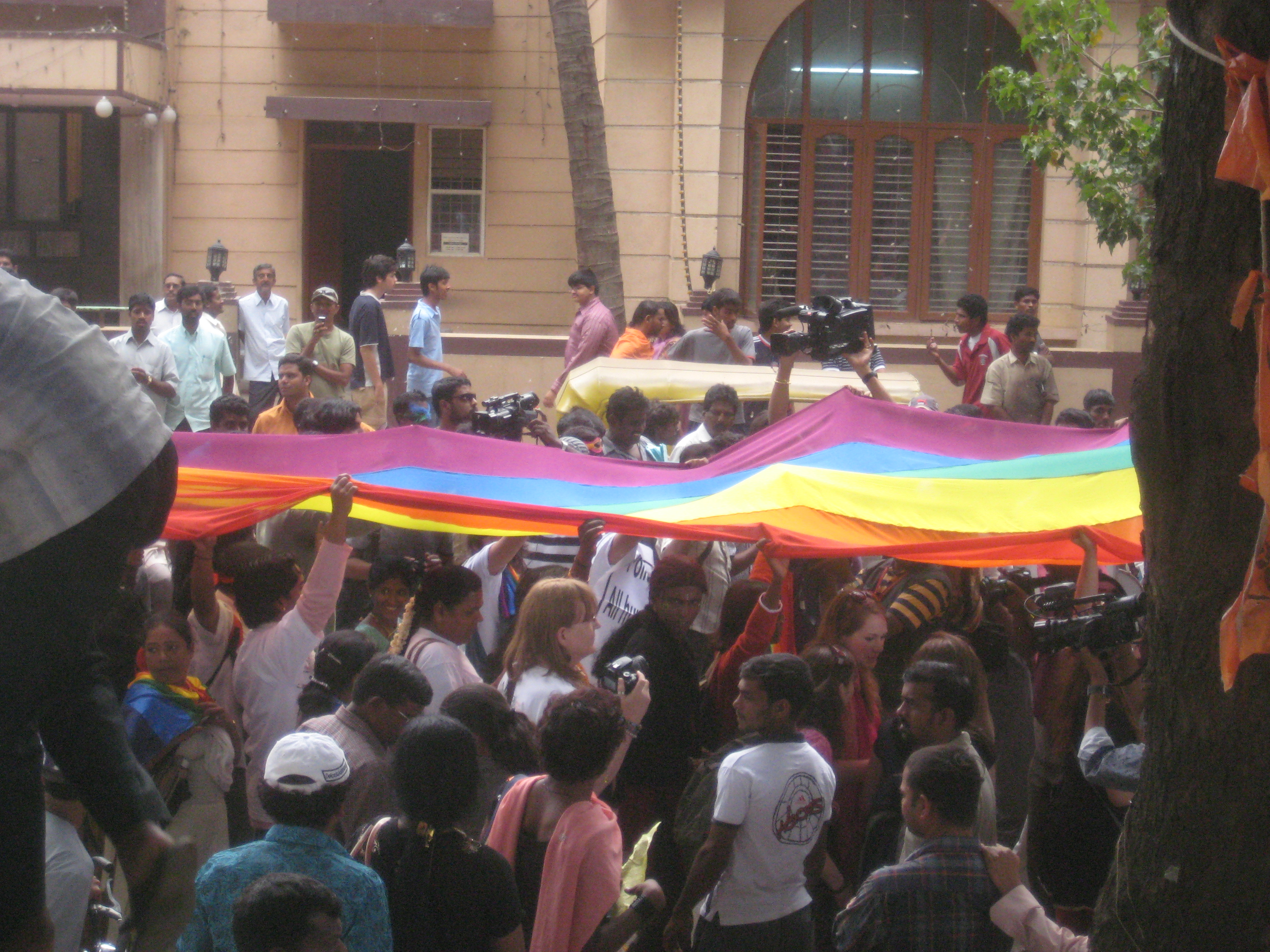
Gay Pride March in Bangalore (2013)

While the discussion on homosexuality is happening in India, the below pride parades have been established in various major cities of India:

- Assam- Guwahati (2014): Guwahati Queer Pride Parade
- Goa- Panjim (2017): Pride De Goa (2017)
- Gujarat- Ahmedabad (2009): Ahmedabad Pride Parade
- Gujarat- Surat (2013): First Gujarat state LGBT pride parade
- Gujarat- Baroda (2014):
- Jharkhand- Jamshedpur (2018): Jamshedpur LGBTQ Pride (2018)
- Karnataka- Bangalore (2008): Bengaluru Pride
- Kerala- Thrissur (2010): First Kerala Queer Pride at Thrissur
- Kerala- Kochi (2014): Cochin Queer Pride
- Kerala- Thiruvananthapuram (2015): Kerala Queer Pride 2015 at Thiruvananthapuram
- Kerala- Thrissur (2018): Kerala Queer Pride at Thrissur (2018)
- Kerala- Kochi (2019): 10th Kerala Queer Pride at Kochi (2019)
- Kerala- Thiruvananthapuram (2020): Queerythm Pride Walk at Thiruvananthapuram (2020)
- Madhya Pradesh- Bhopal (2017): Bhopal Pride (2017) – the first Pride event to take place in the state of Madhya Pradesh
- Maharashtra- Mumbai (2008): Mumbai Queer Azaadi March
- Maharashtra- Pune (2011): Pune Pride, second to be established in Maharashtra)
- Maharasthra- Nagpur (2016): Orange City LGBT Pride March, Nagpur (2016)
- Odisha- Bhubaneshwar (2009): Bhubaneswar Pride Parade
- Odisha- Bhawanipatna (2012): Bhawanipatna Pride
- Punjab- Amritsar (2019): Amritsar Pride Parade (2019)
- Rajasthan- Jaipur (2015): Queer Gulabi Pride Jaipur
- Tamil Nadu- Chennai (2009): Chennai Rainbow Pride
- Tamil Nadu- Madurai (2012): Asia's first Genderqueer pride parade and Alan Turing Rainbow festival, Madurai
- Tamil Nadu- Chennai (2013): Chennai Rainbow Film Festival
- Tamil Nadu- Chennai (2018): Chennai Queer LitFest
- Telangana- Hyderabad (2013): Hyderabad Pride
- Uttar Pradesh- Gurgaon (2016): Gurgaon queer pride
- Uttar Pradesh- Lucknow (2017): Awadh Pride was the first such event to take place in the state of Uttar Pradesh
- Uttarakhand- Dehradun: Dehradun Pride Parade
- West Bengal- Kolkata (1999): Kolkata Rainbow Pride Walk – This is the first pride march to be organised in South Asia, that was organised by members of the support group Counsel Club, and witnessed participants walking down the streets of Kolkata starting from Park Circus Maidan.
- Chandigarh (2013): Chandigarh Pride
- Delhi (2008): Delhi Queer Pride Parade
- Delhi (2022): SFI Delhi Campus Pride Parade in Arts faculty

A tradition in Indian pride parades is the wearing of colorful masks for the partial purpose of hiding the wearers' identities from public view and avoiding altercations with family members. This is expected to change as less reprisals are feared from the general public, as shown with the inaugural Pune Pride Parade in December 2011, which required participants to dress professionally and avoid wearing masks or colorful makeup.

Participants in the parades hail from various indigenous gender and sexual minority groups and infuse the largely-Western-derived aesthetic of pride with local and national cultural trappings. Western and international tourists also participate in pride celebrations in India.

The Free Hugs Campaigning conducted in Kochi (Ernakulam) and TVM in Kerala.

In Nagpur, Maharashtra, an annual LGBT Pride Carnival is conducted as a part of Pride Month celebrations, since 2018

Since 2012, 2 July has been celebrated as the Indian Coming Out Day to mark the 2009 Naz Foundation v. Govt. of NCT of Delhi judgement that decriminalised homosexual sexual activity.

== Groups and NGOs ==
Groups of various kinds and NGOs (non-governmental organizations also known as non-profit organizations) have long been a bedrock for queer and LGBTQ culture in India. Queer/LGBTQ groups in India come in many forms and operate under various organizational structures: some are social and/or support groups with several regulars who act as conveners and may help provide structure by, for example, setting conversation topics for each week's meeting; other groups identify specifically as "collectives" perhaps to reflect certain aspects of their organization or particular socio-political commitments such as to shared work; still other groups are more freewheeling, and, while they congregate under a group name, do not seem to have a designated leader, though there are members who are "moderators" of the group's Facebook group. The language that groups and individual members use to talk about and label genders and sexualities also varies. Some prefer lgbt, lgbtqia+, or a similar acronym, while others prefer queer, which some see as linked to a politics of intersectionality and/or inclusion, and some use lgbtqia+ and queer interchangeably. To acknowledge each position, this section uses both simultaneously, joined by either "and" or a slash. When it is clear that a group or individual prefers a specific term, that language will be used.

Such groups and NGO spaces provided—and still provide—indispensable social spaces for queer/lgbtqia+ people, perhaps because, at least until quite recently, other publicly accessible social or meeting spaces geared towards queer/lgbtqia+ people (such as bars) did not exist. Some bars and cafes are more frequently known to be "queer friendly" rather than catering specifically—if not almost exclusively—to queer/lgbtqia+ people in the way that gay bars are in some other countries; several such examples are Kitty Su, the LaLit hotel chain's swanky night club chain, and Q Café in New Delhi, which recently closed down in 2019.

Some queer/lgbtqia+ groups follow a nomadic style, meeting periodically at different coffee shops, restaurants, book shops, and similar public areas. Others have a fixed meeting spot—often the offices of an NGO.

Public visibility and understanding of queerness and lgbtqia+ experiences is increasing rapidly in India—particularly during and after the more recent Delhi High Court (2009) and India Supreme Court rulings (2013 and 2018) that toggled back and forth the legality of IPC (Indian Penal Code) section 377. The Supreme Court's final ruling, in September 2018, read down section 377 to legalize, between consenting adults, what is generally referred to as "homosexual sex"—although the precise wording of section 377 outlawed "anal intercourse against the order of nature." Nonetheless, queer and lgbtqia+ groups remain an indispensable central axis of queer sociality—alongside several secret and/or private Facebook groups, some of which correspond to social and support groups that periodically meet in the physical world (or IRL—in real life—to use internet terminology).

The sections below list, and provide information about, queer and lgbtqia+ groups, businesses, and notable figures. These lists are not intended to be comprehensive, and at the end of each section is a list of additional queer and lgbtqia+ groups around India. The section concerning groups includes several that are now defunct but whose contribution to lgbtqia+ culture in India is significant as the groups shaped the lgbtqia+ community while they existed—and after.

=== Groups, formal and informal (in alphabetical order) ===
==== Alternative Law Forum ====
The Alternative Law Forum (ALF) in Bangalore, Karnataka (South India) is an organization that "integrates alternative lawyering with critical research, alternative dispute resolution," and additional education and community engagement on a range of issues. Frequently referred to as ALF, the Alternative Law Forum is known across India. ALF's motto, "lawyering for change," succinctly captures the organization's philosophy and body of work.

A group of lawyers who desired a forum in which to conduct legal work grounded in social justice concerns founded ALF in 2000, ALF is regularly involved in assisting individuals who run afoul of potentially corrupt or discriminatory police, such as transgender and queer people. Members of ALF took part in action against the Indian Government's August 2019 revocation of Jammu and Kashmir's special status. The organization hosts a small library and a variety of public events.

==== Dragvanti ====
Dragvanti is a non commercial India's first drag and Lgbtqia+ community and web portal for Indian and south Asian drag performers in India founded by Patruni Chidananda Sastry. Dragvanti has organised Indians first drag conference called Hyderabad Drag Con in 2019.

==== The Kinky Collective ====
The Kinky Collective is a group of people who are interested in Kink—that is, BDSM (Bondage, Domination or Discipline, Submission or Sadism, and Masochism)—and/or who identify as kinky, Based in Delhi, the collective seeks to spread information to those who are interested in BDSM. Not exclusively a queer space, The Kinky Collective includes many queer/lgbtqia+ individuals, explaining on their website that, fundamentally, "we want India to be a safer and sexier place for all people."

==== Labia--A Queer Feminist LBT Collective ====
Labia is "a Queer Feminist LBT [lesbian, bisexual, and trans] Collective" based in Bombay. LABIA, long-dedicated to intersectionality, does queer and feminist activism and organizing.

Several name evolutions undergone by LABIA reflect the changing politics of global queer/LGBTQIA+ conversations and the evolution of conversations occurring within LABIA meetings and between its members. Originally known as Women to Women, the group then became Stree Sangam—meaning "confluence of women"—a name which would not stand out as particularly queer for those affiliated with the group yet hoping to remain discrete. Stree Sangam later took on a new and more overt name, Lesbian and Bisexuals in Action, or LABIA for short. Finally, in acknowledgement that the group included and recognized a multiplicity of genders and sexualities "Lesbians and Bisexuals in Action" became simply "LABIA—a Queer Feminist LBT Collective.

==== The Pratyay Gender Trust ====
The Pratyay Gender Trust is a Kolkata-based organization focused on transgender people. In 2015 Pratyay Gender Trust assisted in the production of a unique Durga idol for Kolkata’s annual Durga Puja; for the first time a puja idol was crafted to appear masculine on one side and feminine on the other. The idol, described by some as a transgender idol, was made by the artist China Pal in Kolkata.

Prakshye is a magazine produced by Pratyay Gender Trust and released quarterly. Very little information about Pratyay Gender Trust is available online. Alongside Sappho for Equality and The Goethe Institute, Pratyay Gender Trust organizes Kolkata’s Dialogues queer film festival.

==== PRISM ====
PRISM was a non-funded queer collective that figures in much anthropological and activist writing about Indian queer communities and activism in the late 1990s and 2000s. Although the acronym originally stood for People for the Rights of Indian Sexual Minorities, PRISM eventually became, simply, PRISM.

==== Sangama ====
Sangama is an NGO that is based in and operates in Bangalore, Karnataka (a southern state of India). Founded by Manohar, who is openly bisexual and eventually married a hijra who worked at Sangama, the organization has been funded in part by funds channeled to address the spread of HIV/AIDS. Sangama is not free of political and social controversy. In her 2012 book Queer Activism in India, Naisargi Dave notes that the organization faced "allegations of discriminations against hijra sex workers there."

==== Sappho for Equality ====
Based in Kolkata, in Eastern India, Sappho for Equality – or Sappho for short – is an organization for and by "sexually marginalized women and transmen"—though they specify that "female and male transpersons" are included under this banner. Begun in 2003, Sappho for Equality grew out of a group known only as Sappho, which was started in 1999. The organization focuses on "rights and social justice" for queer people and seeks "to go beyond identity-based politics."

Sappho's physical-world base is at 21, Jogendra Garden (South), Ground Floor (near Hindol Park), in Kolkata (700 078). Their website also provides email and phone contact information for the many folks to avail their services, support and open community space. Furnished with a library, Sappho's headquarters are inviting and host many meetings, formal and informal. The organization actively engages with the wider community, collaborating with feminist movements and similar groups. Kolkata's annual film festival, Dialogues, is organized by Sappho, alongside The Pratyay Gender Trust, and The Goethe Institute.

Sappho for Equality offers a range of services, including peer counseling, assistance with crises, and workshops. They offer mental health services not only to queer/LGBTQIA+ individuals, but also to members of these individuals' families.

==== Voices Against 377 ====
Voices Against 377 is a collection of "organizations and individuals" who together were, as their name expresses, banded together as "Voices Against 377." The number 377 refers to the colonial-era penal code that was interpreted as criminalizing a range of sexual acts including anal sex. As the legal battle over IPC section 377 progressed, Voices—as it became known—was formed in Delhi in the fall of 2003 to represent a swath of people and groups that advocated for queer/lgbtqia+ interests, were against the penal code, and supported striking down or reading down the law. Voices includes myriad groups and individuals. Organizations in Voices include: Anjuman, Breakthrough, Creating Resources for Empowerment in Action (CREA), Haq: Center for Child Rights, Jagori, Nigah, Nirantar, Partners for Law in Development (PLD), PRISM, Saheli, and Sama. Those individuals who make up Voices include: Gautham Bhan, Lesley Esteves, Ponni Arasu, Pramada Menon, and Sumit Baudh.

Voices Against 377 was an intervenor in the Delhi High Court and India Supreme Court cases against IPC 377—that is, they were a party in the case, though not the original plaintiff. In 2006, Voices Against 377 added its name in support of a petition filed by the Naz Foundation against IPC 377 after the India Supreme Court had reinstated the case to be heard by the Delhi High Court following the Delhi High Court's 2004 dismissal of the case on the basis that the issue was speculative rather than practical—that is, that there was "no cause of action" because the plaintiff, the NGO Naz Foundation, failed to demonstrate that prosecutions resulted from IPC 377. A fundamental right to "dignity" possessed by all, including LGBT people, was central to the filing that Voices contributed to the court case. Mr. Shyam Divan was the council representing Voices Against 377 when the case was heard in the Delhi High Court.

Pride Circle Pride Circle is a "hiring consultancy firm" geared towards LGBTQIA+ people in India based in Bangalore in South India. Founded by Ramakrishna Sinha and Srini Ramaswamy in 2017, Pride Circle is still in its nascency and yet has become known and reported on across India, particularly following its crowning achievement, an LGBT-focused job fair held during the summer of 2019.

Pride Circle organized a job fair on 12 July 2019, that was widely touted as the first LGBT job fair in India. Hosted by The Lalit Ashok in Bangalore, this first-of-its-kind job fair-cum-inclusivity-in-business conference attracted a plethora of globally known multi-national companies (MNCs).

==== Additional groups include ====
Good As You (Bangalore), The Humsafar Trust (Bombay), LesBit (Bangalore), Mobbera Foundation (Hyderabad), Nazariya (Delhi), Sahodaran (Chennai), Orinam (Chennai), Nirangal (Chennai), Magizhavan (Chennai), Queerala (Kochi), Queerythm (Thiruvananthapuram), Sahayathrika (Thrissur), Hridayam (Indore), Umang and more.

=== Queer/LGBTQIA+ businesses and business-oriented social spaces (in alphabetical order) ===
==== Kitty Su ====
Kitty Su, the LaLit's queer/lgbtqia+-friendly night club, has branches across India in the hotel chain's New Delhi, Mumbai, Chandigarh, and Bangalore locations. The Bangalore branch is referred to as Kitty Ko. Kitty Su and Kitty Ko regularly host drag performances and other events catering to queer/lgbtqia+ folks.

==== The LaLit hotel chain ====
This 5-star luxury hotel chain is the only such major business chain in India that seeks to advertise and establish itself as self-consciously queer/lgbtqia+-friendly. Keshav Suri, son of Lalit Suri who founded of the LaLit Hotel Group, is openly gay. Keshav Suri took over management of the LaLit after his father's death.

The LaLit New Delhi hosted a conference on psychology and lgbtqia+ identities, geared towards enhancing mental health professionals' understandings of lgbtqia+ identities and common experiences of discrimination that lgbtqia+ people may experience and which can negatively affect lgbqia+ peoples' mental health.

The LaLit hotels are located in six cities: New Delhi, Bangalore, Jaipur, Kolkata, Chandigarh, and London. The LaLit also owns palaces (in Udaipur and Srinagar) and resorts (in Raj Baga, Palolem Canacona, Goa; Bekal, Kerala; Faridabad, Haryana; and Khajuraho, Madhya Pradesh).

==== Mykonos ====
Mykonos, located in South Delhi near Qutub Minar, is a business that includes a guest house, spa, and gym. Q Café was also located on the rooftop of Mykonos, although it is now closed. Described on its own and travel websites as a "men’s spa," Mykonos caters towards men. The rainbow background of its sign and—visible in a photo on the website—and events listed on the website make clear that the venue caters to queer and lgbtqia+ people, and predominately to gay men. The spa's website does not make clear whether, or to what extent, women are welcome and if women wishing to use the spa—steam room, dry sauna, Jacuzzi tub, and gym—would be turned away. Guests should also note that there is no official information on what the norms of behavior—social and sexual—are at Mykonos. Particularly, it is not clear to what extent safe sex practices—such as always using condoms—are the norm at Mykonos.

=== Notable queer and LGBTQIA+ figures in India (in alphabetical order by surname) ===
==== Dutee Chand ====
Dutee Chand, an Indian sprinter already famous for her speed, received an extra dose of attention in 2019 following her announcement that she was in a relationship with a woman from her home village in Odisha, India. Although she specifically noted to news media that she does not use any label like "gay" to describe herself, Chand has been labeled as India's first openly gay athlete by a plethora of media sources.

==== Menaka Guruswamy and Arundhati Katju ====
Menaka Guruswamy and Arundhati Katju are two lawyers who worked together on the final hearing before the supreme regarding IPC 377. After a complex, multi-decade legal battle over the statue, the Indian supreme court read down the statue in 2018 and the two women won a place in Time's 2019 list of the 100 most influential people. The two publicly announced that they are a couple in 2019.

==== Ashok Row Kavi ====
Claiming to be the first openly gay man in India, Ashok Row Kavi is a journalist and activist who founded the well-known, large, and well-funded Humsafar Trust based in Bombay. Also colloquially awarded the moniker "the mother of gay activism [in India]" Row Kavi was one of the petitioners who fought against IPC 377. He is also known for his support for the ruling Hindu nationalist BJP and India's present Prime Minister Narendra Modi.

==== Arvind Narrain ====
Arvind Narrain is a lawyer who, along with several others, founded the Alternative Law Forum. He is the co-editor of several books, including Law Like Love and Because I Have a Voice. He works on queer and lgbtqia+ rights nationally and internationally.

==== Keshav Suri ====
Keshav Suri is a hotelier and the executive director of The Lalit Suri Hospitality Group Hotels founded by his father, Lalit Suri. Openly gay and married to his long-time partner Cyril Feuillbois since June 2018, Keshav Suri has emerged in recent years as a queer and gay leader both in business practices in India and in corners of queer/lgbtqia+ communities in India.

==== Sukhdeep Singh ====
Sukhdeep Singh is the founder and editor of Gaylaxy, an India-focused LGBT online magazine. Singh works as a software engineer. Singh received the youth leadership award of Sher Vancouver and is also author of several articles on how he conceptualizes the meeting of Sikhism and queerness.

==== Laxmi Tripathi ====
Laxmi Tripathi is a well-known Bombay-based activist who works on transgender rights. She identifies specifically as a hijra. She is the author of Me Laxmi, me Hijra.

==== Living Smile Vidya ====
Living Smile Vidya is an author, performance artist, and transgender activist based in Chennai. She holds a masters in linguistics. She has received awards for her work, including "Best Story" from the Karnataka State Film Award in 2014 and the Charles Wallace scholarship in 2013. Meanwhile, her book, I am Vidya: A Transgender's Journey, has been translated into seven languages. In addition to her publications, she has spoken about her experiences being a "dalit transgender writer" in an interview.

==== Other notable figures ====
Additional notable figures include Gautham Bhan, Ritu Dalmia, Pawan Dhall, Hoshang Merchant, A. Revathi, Chayanika Shah, Giti Thadani, Siddharth Thirmulai Kumar (Chennai's first openly gay amateur tennis player and notable Transgender rights activist), Akkai Padmashali, Grace Banu Vijayarajamallika.

== Organizations ==
There are many organizations in many cities of India, such as Humsafar (Mumbai), Alternative Law Forum (Bangalore), Delhi University Queer Collective (Delhi), Sangama (Karnataka), Chennai Dost, Orinam.net and Nazariya (Delhi NCR) are working for LGBT rights. There are also organisations which function nationwide like Human Rights India and Gaysi. Many of these organizations operate in a very informal way and locally funded. In Kerala, organizations like Queerala and Queerythm gave a new face to LGBT rights. Apart from Non governmental organization's and Community based organisation's LGBTQIA+ student movements which are registered under the government of India are Srishti Madurai a student volunteer LGBTQIA and Genderqueer movement based at Madurai. In June 2016, a platform named [Amour | amour.lgbtq.co.in] is launched in India to help LGBTIQ community members find long term companions.
