= LGBTQ rights in Kerala =

- Kerala
- Legal status: Legal since 2018
- Gender identity: Third gender recognised; transgender people may change legal gender
- Discrimination protections: Discrimination protections in line with Navtej Singh Johar v. Union of India and National Legal Services Authority v. Union of India

Family rights
- Recognition of relationships: No recognition of same-sex relationships
- Adoption: No

Lesbian, gay, bisexual, transgender and queer (LGBTQ) people in Kerala face legal and social difficulties not experienced by non-LGBTQ persons. However, Kerala has been at the forefront of LGBTQ issues in India after Tamil Nadu. It became one of the first states in India to establish a welfare policy for the transgender community and in 2016, proposed implementing free gender affirmation surgery through government hospitals. Same-sex sexual activity has been legal since 2018, following the Supreme Court ruling in Navtej Singh Johar v. Union of India. In addition, numerous LGBT-related events have been held across Kerala, including in Kochi and Thrissur. However, there has been historical and contemporary opposition to LGBTQ rights, especially due to meninist groups, conservative political groups, religious organizations and social conservatism prevalent in Kerala society in general.

== Law regarding same-sex sexual activity ==
Homosexual intercourse was made a criminal offence under Section 377 of the Indian Penal Code in 1861. This made it an offence for a person to voluntarily have "carnal intercourse against the order of nature." In 2009, the Delhi High Court decision in Naz Foundation v. Govt. of NCT of Delhi found Section 377 and other legal prohibitions against private, adult, consensual, and non-commercial same-sex conduct to be in direct violation of fundamental rights provided by the Indian Constitution.

On 11 December 2013, the Supreme Court of India overturned the 2009 Delhi High Court order decriminalising consensual homosexual activity. Justices G. S. Singhvi and S. J. Mukhopadhaya, however, noted that the Indian Parliament should debate and decide on the matter. Protests against the Supreme Court verdict ensued. On 28 January 2014, the Supreme Court dismissed a review petition filed by the Central Government, the NGO Naz Foundation and several others against the ruling.

On 2 February 2016, the Supreme Court decided to review the criminalisation of homosexual activity. On 6 September 2018, the Supreme Court unanimously struck down Section 377 as unconstitutional, ruling that it infringed on the fundamental rights of autonomy, intimacy, and identity, thus legalising homosexuality in India, including in Kerala.

== Recognition of same-sex relationships ==
Same-sex marriages are not recognised or performed in India. However, in recent times, movements advocating for such recognition has emerged in Kerala, and India in general.

In a survey conducted by India Today, 58% of participants from the state rejected same-sex relationships - the 4th highest among the 12 states surveyed.

== Discrimination protections ==
In line with Navtej Singh Johar v. Union of India and National Legal Services Authority v. Union of India, discrimination on the basis of sexual orientation and gender identity is prohibited via Article 15 of the Constitution of India. However, this article only extends to discrimination by state or government bodies.

Adopted in 2019, the Transgender Persons (Protection of Rights) Act, 2019 bans unfair discrimination against transgender people in educational establishment and services, employment, healthcare services, access to the "use of any goods, accommodation, service, facility, benefit, privilege or opportunity dedicated to the use of the general public or customarily available to the public", the right to movement, the right to "reside, purchase, rent or otherwise occupy any property", the opportunity to stand for or hold public or private office, and in government or private establishments.

== Transgender rights ==
In 2014, the Indian Supreme Court ruled to recognize a "third gender" in the case of National Legal Services Authority v. Union of India, affirming the transgender community's freedom from discrimination and right to equality. The state of Kerala was the first to follow up on the ruling, introducing a government transgender policy in 2015. The policy addresses the right for people belonging to transgender communities to identify as "male", "female" or "TG" (Third Gender). It has provisions to protect the community by providing equal access to social and economic resources, protecting the right to equal treatment under the law, the right to life, liberty and justice, and the right to non-discrimination based on sex.

Kerala has been at the forefront of transgender rights in India. It was one of the first states with a policy for transgender people, which was introduced in 2015, and has introduced several welfare programs for the community. In 2016, the State Government proposed introducing free sex reassignment surgeries in government hospitals. Kannur district in 2016 allocated a part of its budget towards employment and skill training programs for transgender people. However, societal discrimination, particularly in employment and housing, and various implementation issues remain major problems. A lack of training means that many government hospitals cannot offer gender affirming surgery, so patients must instead go to costlier private institutions. While the government provides reimbursement for gender affirming surgeries and a scholarship scheme for transgender students between classes 7 and 10, stigma, lack of care standards and issues with fund disbursement (as people who undergo these procedures must raise the funds themselves before being refunded afterwards) hamper access.

In February 2016, President Pranab Mukherjee opened the "Gender Park" in Kozhikode as an institution dedicated to policies concerning gender equality and LGBT issues.

In 2016, the country's first transgender school opened in the city of Kochi. The school prepared students for the 10th and 12th standard board exams and provided vocational skills training. The school welcomed 10 transgender students ranging from ages 25–50. Transgender activist Vijayarajamallika, who was the head of the school, stated, "the school aims at making transgender people eligible for taking decent jobs and living a dignified life." She further stated, "we have admitted six candidates so far, all male-to-female persons, from 14 applicants. Of the 10 seats, we have reserved one for female-to-male and one for the disabled." The teachers of the school were also transgender. The school sought to open more opportunities for the community to gain an occupation and an education. Three months after its opening, however, the center stopped functioning as a school with no academic staff, students, or accreditation. The building was turned into a hostel for the transgender staff of Kochi Metro and related institutions.

In 2017, the clothing brand Red Lotus hired two transgender people to model their sarees, Maya Menon and Gowri Savithri. . This gained a lot of attention and went viral on social media. The line is part of Sharmila Nair's collection "Mazhavil" (മഴവില്ല്) or "rainbow", representing the rainbow colours associated with LGBT rights, and is dedicated to transgender people.

In 2017, a workshop was held in Kozhikode to address the implementation of the state's transgender policy within social institutions. It was organized by the Social Justice Department, and around 30 representatives of the transgender community attended. During the workshop, they discussed proposals such as having identity cards for transgender people, developing a pension plan for those within the community who are over 60, the implementation of skill development training programs, having scholarships and educational loans for transgender students, and providing driving lessons in order for transgender people to be employed as Uber drivers.

The Government Medical College Hospital in Kottayam opened a clinic in 2017 that exclusively attends to the transgender community. The clinic has a panel of doctors who are specialized in the area. This was the first government clinic of its kind, and focuses on serving the transgender community, as well as opening its doors to sex workers. The proposal for the clinic was put forward by the District Legal Services Authority (DLSA) after a campaign had voiced health concerns for the transgender community.

A recent spate of killings of transgender people and lack of responsible investigation into the cases by the police have raised security concerns among the transgender community in Kerala. There have also been a rise in incidents of harassment by police personals towards transgender people when they approach police stations for filing complaints which resulted in a direction by the DGP to address their grievances without delay.

The suicide of Anannyah Kumari Alex, Kerala's first transgender RJ and activist, alleging botched-up gender affirmation surgery lead to protests by the LGBTQIA+ community of Kerala and initiated discussions about the irregularities and the absence of a specific protocol for conducting gender affirmation surgeries in various private hospitals of the state. The state government appointed an expert committee to look into various issues faced by transgender persons in health sector and also initiated steps to conduct free gender affirmation surgeries in government hospitals of Kerala.

The suicide of Praveen Nath, Kerala's first transgender bodybuilder, has turned the attention to transphobic groups mushrooming across Kerala recently, many of them are rooted in religious fundamentalism. Minister R. Bindu blamed both cyber bullying and transphobia in the media for the suicide and has described Praveen Nath as a martyr.

== Living conditions ==
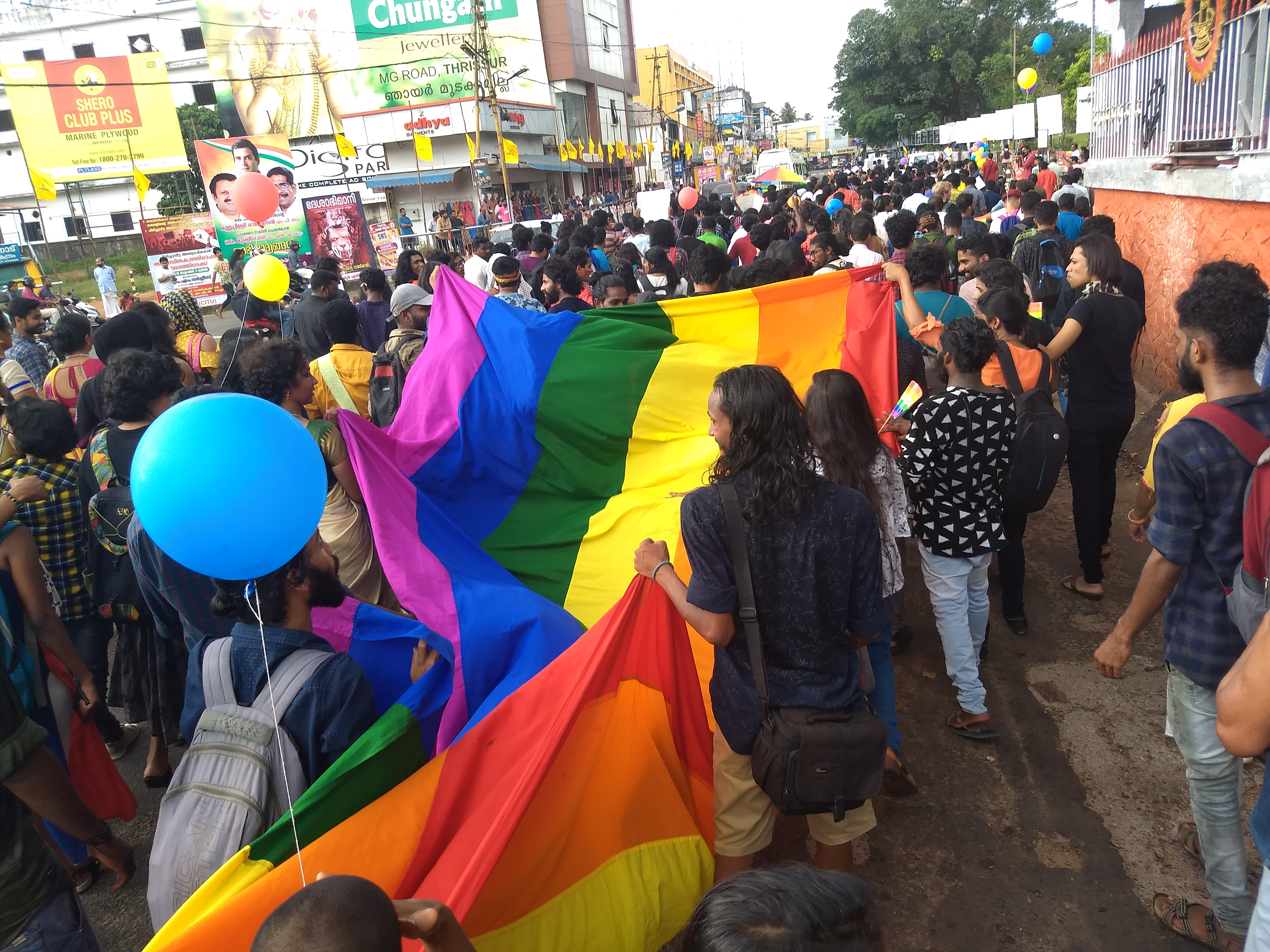
Participants at a pride parade in Thrissur in October 2018

Until very recently, LGBT people were "invisible" in Kerala society. Despite Kerala being the most literate Indian state, ignorance concerning homosexuality was very high; with few LGBT people opting to come out, in fear that family members would "take them to a psychiatrist or file a police complaint against friends." Local activists associate these attitudes as "the result of the Victorian sense of morality that treats sex as sin". This climate has eased in recent years. As of 2020, gay conversion therapy is reportedly widely practised despite position statements by multiple psychiatrist/psychologist organisations describing the practice as unscientific and illegal.

Queerala (Malayalam: ക്വിയറള), is one of Kerala's main LGBT advocacy groups, campaigning for increased awareness of LGBT people and sensitisation concerning healthcare services, educational curriculum and workplace policies. Queerythm (Malayalam: ക്വിയറിഥം), another LGBT organisation, also plays a key role in organising the annual pride marches in Kerala and runs a 24X7 helpline for community members in distress. Sahayathrika, the first ever community based organisation formed in Kerala which mainly caters to the needs of female-born members of the LGBT+ community, recently celebrated its 20th anniversary in 2022.

=== Pride marches ===
Kerala Queer Pride (കേരള ക്വിയർ പ്രൈഡ്) has been held annually across various cities in Kerala, beginning in July 2010 in the city of Thrissur. The tenth edition was held in Kochi in November 2019. It was launched in the aftermath of the 2009 Delhi High Court judgement decriminalising all consensual sex between adults. The event focuses on advocacy regarding LGBT issues, as well as sensitisation of the police and media to prevent violence and discrimination against members of the LGBT community. After a gap of 2 years due to COVID-19, the eleventh Kerala Queer Pride took place in Kollam in September 2022. An annual pride walk has also been organised by Queerythm in Thiruvananthapuram since 2017.

== Public opinion ==
In the 2021 Mathrubhumi Youth Manifesto Survey on respondents aged 15–35, 74% of the respondents supported legislation for same-sex marriage.

== Opposition ==
There has been organized opposition to LGBT+ rights in recent years. Anti-LBGT groups include meninist groups, right-wing political groups, and religious organizations. M. K. Muneer and K. M. Shaji have repeatedly voiced opposition, with critics describing some statements as hateful. Abuse directed against the community and its supporters was reported to be at an all-time high, including Kerala Blasters Football Club and actor Mammootty. The suicides of at least two individuals have been linked to homophobic abuse. In December 2023, the High Court of Kerala described the cyber attacks against the LGBT+ community as a 'serious issue' and asked the authorities to take necessary action. Malappuran’s annual pride march in 2023 was attacked by a homophobic mob.

== See also ==
- LGBTQ rights in India
- LGBTQ rights in Goa
- Kerala Queer Pride
