= XUKIA =

LGBTQ organization in Assam, India

- Founded: 2014
- Type: Charitable trust
- Purpose: LGBT
- Location: Guwahati, India
- Region served: Assam
- Method: Education, lobbying, research, consultancy
- Website: www.xukia.in

XUKIA is a queer collective based in Assam, India that works for LGBT issues in the region. It is one of the first Queer Collectives to come up in the North East India.

== History ==
After the Supreme Court Judgement on 11 December 2013 which reinstated Section 377, IPC, thereby criminalizing homosexual acts, protests were held all over the world. On 15 December 2013, a Global Day of Rage was observed simultaneously in a number of cities around the world. A group of people, mostly young women came together and organized a protest in Guwahati also to mark the Global Day of Rage. This was the first ever public rally/protest for LGBT issues in the city. The same group of individuals later went on to organise the Queer Pride Guwahati on 9 February 2014, which was the first LGBT Pride Parade in the entire North East Region. After the success of the Pride Parade, Xukia was created as a collective to take forward the LGBTIQ activism in the region.

== Work ==
Soon after its inception, Xukia organised Dialogues: Lesbian Gay Bisexual Transgender Film and Video Festival in Guwahati from 8 to 10 August, which was a traveling version of the annual film festival held in Kolkata. The LGBT film fest, another first for the region was organized by Xukia in collaboration with Sappho for Equality, Pratyay Gender Trust, Goethe-Institut/Max Mueller Bhawan Kolkata and SAHRA India . The festival screened 10 movies and 2 collections of short films from international film festivals like the Dresden and Berlinale.

Xukia has also organized film screenings in schools and colleges in the city. Representatives from Xukia also attended the Rainbow Leadership program in Sweden which is a global program for sustainable LGBT leadership sponsored by the U.S. and Sweden through USAID and SIDA.

Xukia was also one of the groups involved in organising the LGBTQ North East Pride Walk 2015, held in Guwahati on 15 February 2015. After the Queer Pride Guwahati in 2014, the North East Pride Walk was organised as a collective pride of all 8 states of the region.

In July 2015, Xukia launched the first multilingual LGBTQI publication in the Assam named "The Forbidden: ek xukia dristanto".

== See also ==
- LGBT rights in India
- Homosexuality in India
- LGBT culture in India
