= Queer Pride Guwahati =

LGBT event in India

Queer Pride Guwahati কুইয়াৰ প্ৰাইড গুৱাহাটী
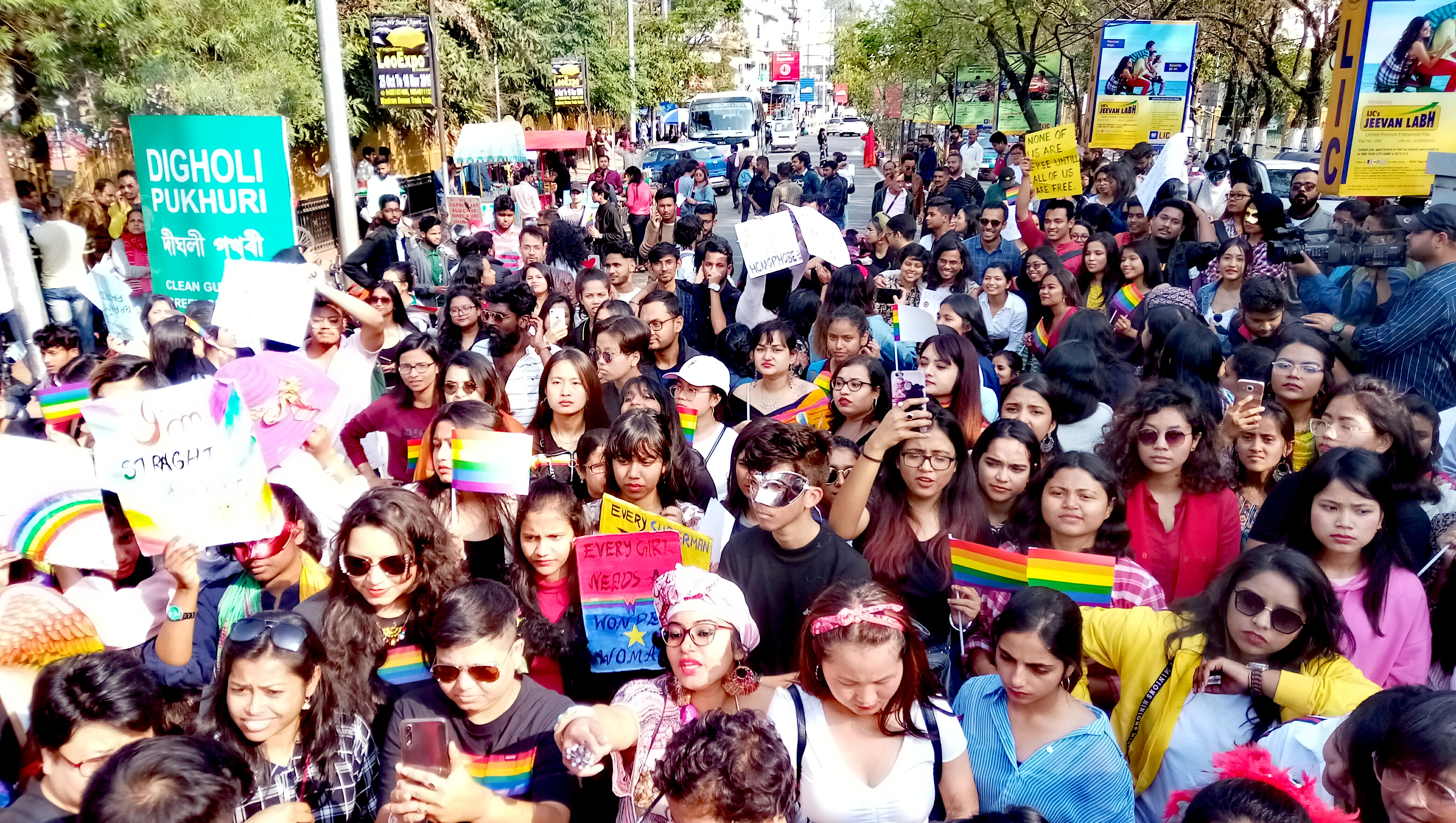
- Guwahati Pride Walk, 2020
- Status: Active
- Genre: Pride parade
- Frequency: annually
- Locations: Dighalipukhuri, Guwahati
- Country: India
- Inaugurated: 9 February 2014

Queer Pride Guwahati was organised for the first time by the members and supporters of the local LGBT community in Guwahati, Assam on 9 February 2014. The Queer Pride Guwahati was the first LGBT Pride in the entire North Eastern India. The Pride is now an annual event.

== History ==
After the 11 December 2013 judgement by the Supreme Court of India which reinstated the colonial era Section 377, IPC thereby criminalising homosexual activities, protests were organised all over the world. On 15 December 2013 a Global Day of Rage was organised simultaneously in a number of cities around the world. A group of people from Guwahati also joined in to observe the Global Day of Rage in the city, making it the first ever public protest for LGBT issues in Guwahati. Soon after the protests, a group of volunteers from Guwahati organised an LGBT Pride Parade in the city.

== 2014 ==
The first Queer Pride Guwahati was held on 9 February 2014. It started at 10am from Dighalipukhuri and went through RBI Point, Old S.P Office, Commissioners Point, Latasil, Lamb Road and ended at T.C Fountain Point. The Pride also passed in front of the Gauhati High Court where the pride walkers raised slogans against the recent Supreme Court judgement. Approximately 150 people walked the Pride. It saw participants from various schools and colleges.

The costs of the Queer Pride Guwahati were supported through donations from local individuals and individuals at the Queer Azaadi Mumbai and the Delhi Queer Pride committee. A few NGOs based in Guwahati also supported the Pride.

The organisers of the pride also faced some backlash. The office of one of the supporting NGOs was vandalised by right wing conservatives. Some of the participants received threat calls. On the day of the pride, members of Hindu Yuva Chatra Parishad, a right-wing student party, attempted to stop the Pride but were arrested.

Soon after the Pride, some of the organisers created XUKIA, a queer collective to take further the LGBT activism in the region.

== 2015 ==
After the Queer Pride Guwahati, 2014, Manipur also held a Pride Walk in Imphal. In 2015, individuals, groups and organisations from different parts of the northeast India organised a collective pride, the LGBT North East Pride Walk, 2015, which was held on 15 February in Guwahati. The walk proceeded through the route from Dighalipukhuri, RBI Point, Food Villa Point, High Court, Latasil Point, Ambari, and ending at the Guwahati Club Rotary.

== 2016 ==
The third Guwahati Walk took place on 7 February 2016 at Dighalipukhuri, Guwahati and was attended by around 200 people.

A street fashion show was held as part of the celebrations. It was organised by XUKIA. The walk began from Dighalipukhri Park and passed through areas in the vicinity like Handique Girls College, Food Villa, Nehru Park, RKB Hostel and ended back at the Dighalipukhuri Park. While the march was against all forms of discrimination against the LGBTQ community, marchers specifically protested against discriminatory laws like Section 377.

== 2017 ==
The fourth edition of the Guwahati Pride was held on 5 February. About 300 people attended the march. The march was supported by students of Gauhati University, National Law University, Tata Institute of Social Sciences (TISS), as well as activists from West Bengal, Karnataka, and Tamil Nadu. It was marked by rainbow banners, masks, and performance of Bollywood and Assamese romantic songs.

There was also a protest against laws like AFSPA and there were demands to repeal it. There was a call to implement the NALSA judgement.

== 2018 ==
The fifth edition of the Guwahati Pride took place on 11 February. A number of events were held prior to the main pride event such as fundraisers, concerts, and flash mobs. It witnessed participation of people from all across northeast India.

== 2019 ==
The sixth edition of the Guwahati Pride took place on 3 February at Dighalipukhuri, Guwahati.

== 2023 ==
The tenth edition of the Guwahati Pride was planned to take place on 17 December. About 1,000 attendees, including 850 queer people, were expected to march.

== See also ==
- LGBT rights in India
- Homosexuality in India
- LGBT culture in India
