= Gurgaon queer pride =

LGBTQ event in Gurgaon, India

The first Pride March in Gurgaon, India was hosted on 25 June 2016, at Sector -29 Leisure Valley. It was created in order to fill the vacuum of spaces that are queer friendly and pave way to creating a culture of LGBTQIA+ community meets and open dialogue. The LGBTQ community all around the world is under constant threat of abuse, discrimination and even criminalization. Section 377 of the Indian Penal Code considers homosexuality as unnatural or against the order of nature.

‘Gurgaon is home to many multinational companies which have been taking from the city without contributing to it in any way, this city has a fast pace and exclusive space for certain strata of the society and the stark reality of two sides of development is visible.’

The parade was backed by the organizers of the Delhi Queer Pride Parade, but the initiative of hosting it in Gurgaon was of Puja Bajad, who works for an international NGO and is a professional in the development sector. The parade was hosted also to show solidarity to the victims of the attack that took place on 12 June 2016, where at a nightclub in Orlando, Florida a single gunman killed 49 people at Pulse club and injured 53 others. Besides mourning for the victims of the shooting and their friends and family, the pride march also included an agenda of celebrating the LGBT Pride Month (June).

The event had specific demand for repealing section 377 of the Indian Penal Code that was brought by the British colonial rule and freedom from discrimination on account of sexual orientation in order to ensure social justice and create truly inclusive environment. It had a slogan “Ab Gurgaon Door Nahi” announcing the step the city has taken. The event started with reading of the Pride statement followed by open mic and music and dance performances along with the candlelight vigil in solidarity with victims of the shootings at Orlando and Mexico.
