= Jamshedpur LGBTQ Pride =

Pride march held in Jamshedpur, Jharkhand, India

Jamshedpur LGBTQ Pride has been held in Jamshedpur, Jharkhand, India since 2018. The pride march is organised by Utthaan JSR.

== History ==
The first pride march in Jamshedpur was held on April 7, 2018. The march started from Basant Talkies in Sakchi and ended at Jubilee Park. Around 75 people took part in the march. The march had participants from West Bengal, Odisha and other parts of Jharkhand. The marchers demanded removal of Section 377 of the Indian Penal Code.

The second Jamshedpur LGBTQ Pride was held on April 7, 2019. 50-60 people participated in the event. The march started from Bistupur in front of P&M Hi-tech City Centre and ended at Gopal Maidan. The march was supported by Mumbai based organisation Humsafar Trust. A street play to spread awareness about decriminalisation of Section 377 of the Indian Penal Code was organised by Srijan Bharti.

== See also ==
- Homosexuality in India
- LGBT culture in India
