= Bhopal Pride March =

LGBTQ event in Bhopal, India

The Bhopal Pride March was an event held in 2017 to celebrate lesbian, gay, bisexual, and transgender (LGBT) culture in Bhopal, India.

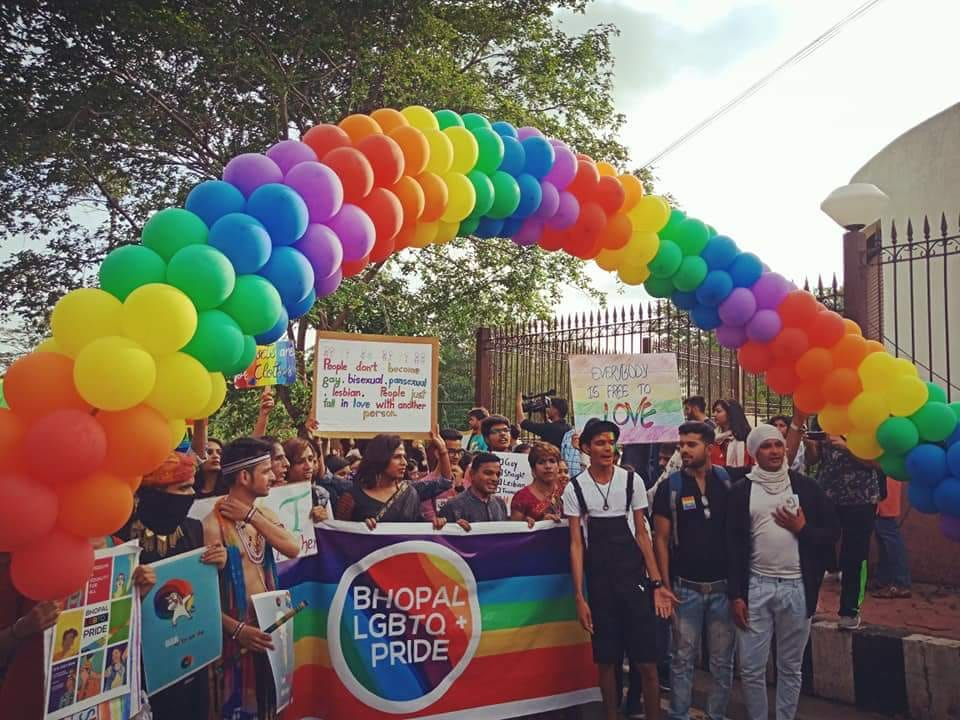
Bhopal Pride March

The march occurred on 17 May 2017. Events included panel discussions, music events, street plays and an art exhibition. The march in 2017 was the first pride march in the Indian state of Madhya Pradesh, and was held on the International Day Against Homophobia, Transphobia and Biphobia. The parade began at the Van Vihar gate and ended at the Hotel Lakeview Ranjit.

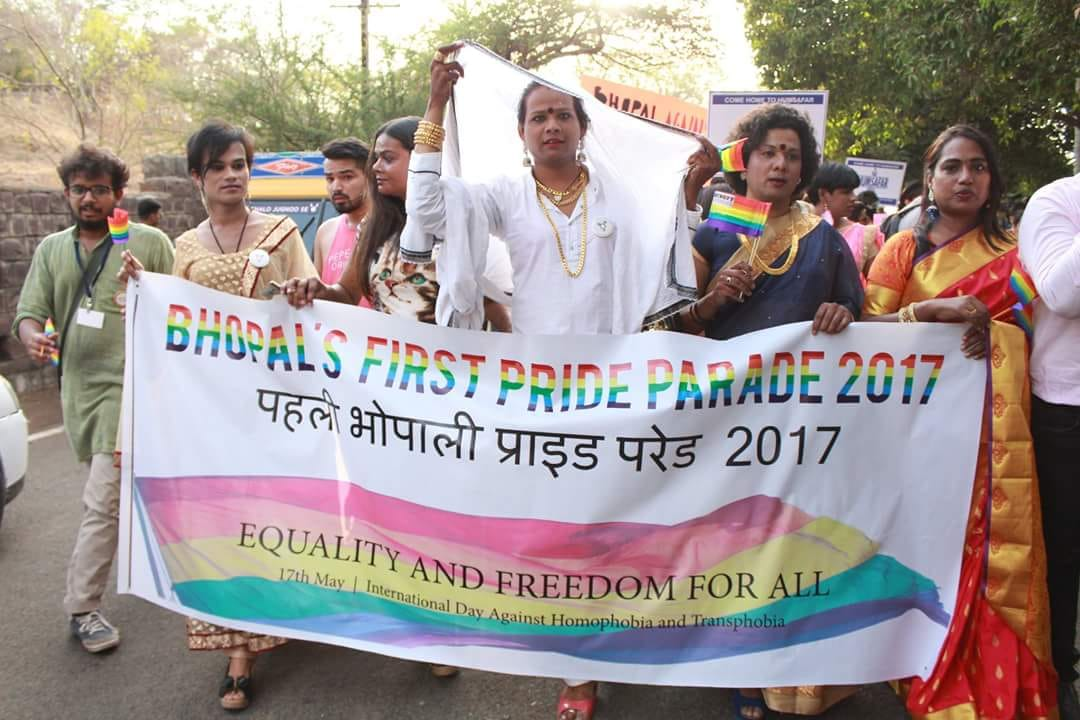
Bhopal Pride March

Kokila Bhattacharya, a member of the organising committee said, ‘We will not be debating or protesting peoples' beliefs, we will only talk about fundamental human rights and a life for the LGBTQ community of dignity and social acceptance."It came about when some students in the college where the awareness sessions were held asked why there weren’t any pride marches in Bhopal. The event was funded by people through crowd funding and didn't rely on sponsors for the same.

== Participation ==
Approximately four hundred LGBTQ community members and allies from across India participated, with marchers demanding that the Madhya Pradesh government set up a transgender/sexual minorities welfare board in Bhopal. The event attracted NGOs and voluntary organisations as participants including the Citizen's Action Network, Mitra Shringaar Samiti, Anmil Seva Sansthan and the Center for Social Justice. Sanjana Singh Rajput, Balram Raikwar and Devi Singh were some of the activists present.

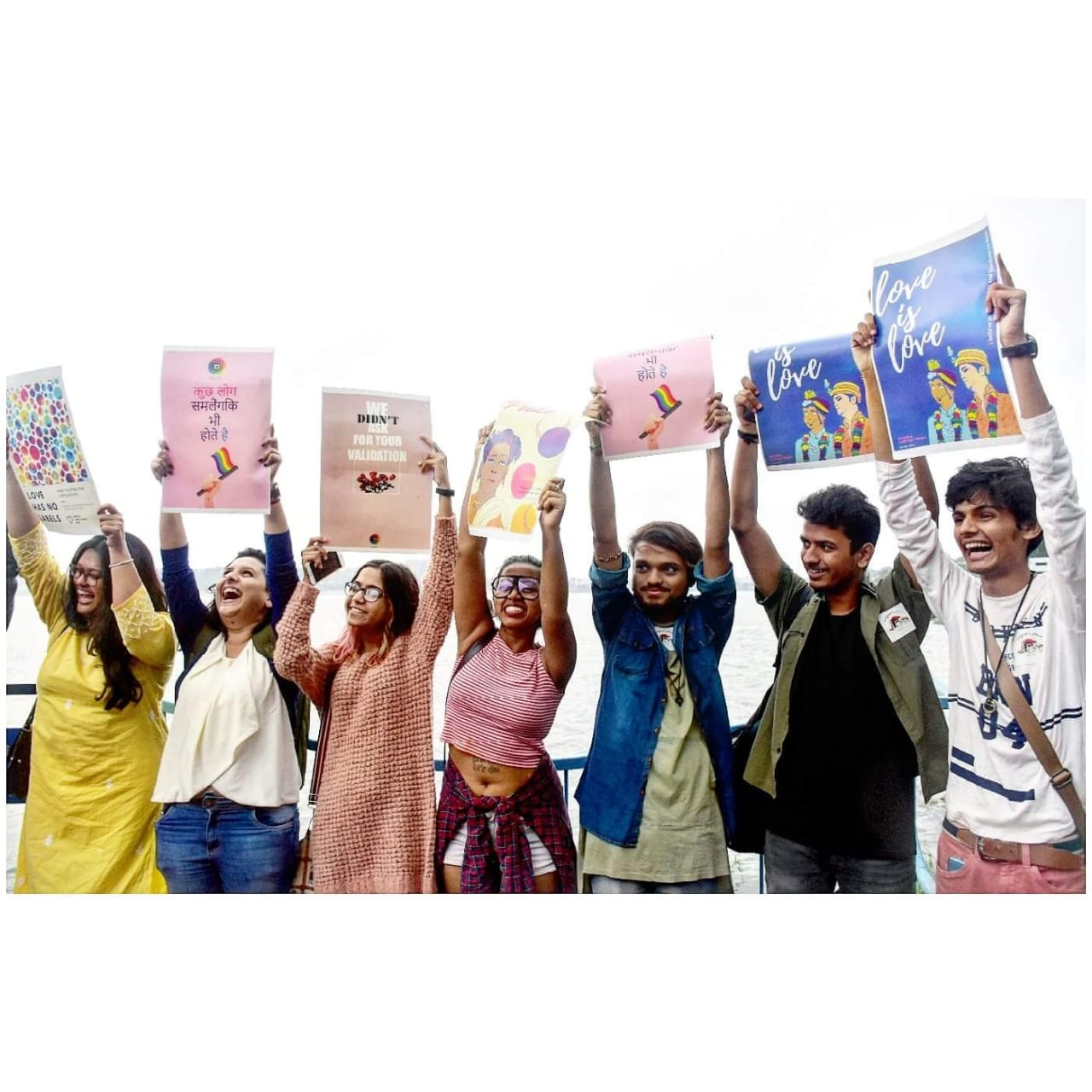
Bhopal Pride March

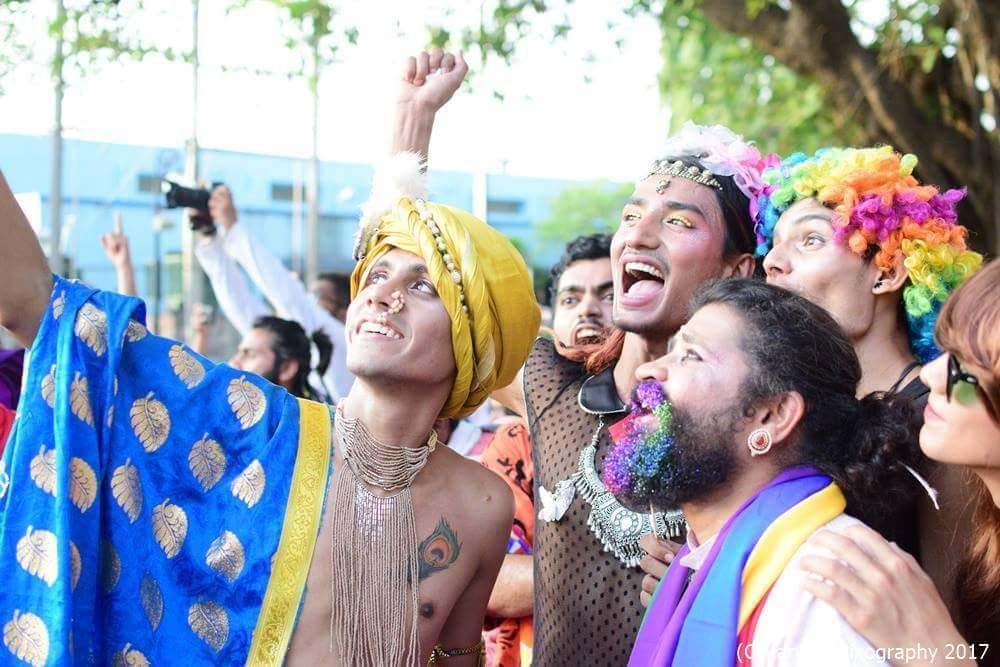
Huge participation in Bhopal Pride March

Before the event, Sanjana Singh Rajput stated, "The parade will mark a way to aware [sic] people about us and it will be aimed [sic] to make people understand that we are also human beings who deserve to be accepted in society and get education, health facilities, and employment opportunities like everyone else."

== History ==
=== 2018 ===
After its first year of Pride Walk in 2017, Bhopal, the capital city of Madhya Pradesh witnessed its second "Gay Pride Parade", 2018. It was a 15-day event from 1–15 July, that conducted various programs including film screenings, open mic, and a reading of Manifesto of Gay Liberation Front. The organizers crowd funded the event through social media sites.

== See also ==
- List of LGBT events
- QueerMitra: A youth LGBTQ+ alliance based in central India Website Facebook link Instagram link
