= Chandigarh LGBT Pride Walk =

Annual event in Chandigarh, India

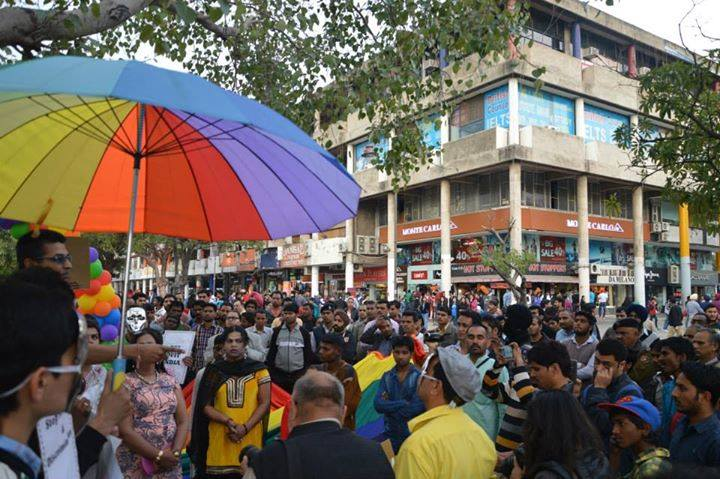
The Gay Pride parade held in Chandigarh on 8 March 2015. This picture was taken during it at Sector 17 plaza.

The Chandigarh LGBTQ Pride Walk is an annual march held as part of the "Garvotsava" pride week celebrations in Chandigarh, the capital city of the northern Indian states of Punjab and Haryana. The event aims to celebrate and bring together the LGBTQ community and its supporters.

Chandigarh was the first city in North India after Delhi to have a pride march in 2013. The parades in Chandigarh are spearheaded by Saksham Trust. The Pride March route typically begins at the Panjab University Student Centre and culminates at Sector 17 plaza in Chandigarh. The march incorporates several local folk dances such as Dhol and Gidda.

== History ==
=== 2013 ===
The first pride march in Chandigarh was held on 15 March 2013. The parade started from Panjab University Student Centre and ended at the City Centre, which is at the heart of Chandigarh. Although more than 500 people were expected to participate, the turnout was low with only 100 people participating in the city's first pride march.

=== 2014 ===
The second edition of the Chandigarh Pride Walk was organised on 2 March 2014. It was the culmination of the LGBT celebrations week which started on 23 February. The celebrations came against the backdrop of the Supreme Court Verdict on Section 377 on 11 December 2013. The week long celebrations included a conversation on Gender and Sexuality and a Qawwali and Kavi Durbar. During the march, participants raised slogans against the Supreme Court ruling on Section 377 and sought legal and social protections for the LGBT community.

=== 2015 ===
The city hosted the LGBTIQ Pride parade for the third time on 8 March 2015. This edition saw the participation of a large number of people, especially students of Panjab University, who did not identify themselves as LGBTIQ, but turned up in support of the LGBTIQ people. Students' organisations such as Ambedkar Students' Association (ASA) and Students For Society (SFS) had extended support for the march.

=== 2016 ===
The fourth edition of the city's pride march took place on 6 March 2016. Several student organisations from Panjab University, IISER and Chitkara University were expected to participate in this edition of the pride march. Their demands included: enactment of comprehensive anti-discrimination laws that prohibit discrimination on the basis of age, sex, class, caste, religion, tribe, ability, ethnicity, gender identity and sexual orientation, effective implementation of the provisions of the Supreme Court judgment in NALSA versus Union of India on the rights of trans people, stringent action against violence against minorities and the silencing of freedom of expression and dissent, and repeal of Section 377 (unnatural offences, sex against order of nature) of the Indian Penal Code.

=== 2017 ===
In 2017, the city named the LGBTQ celebrations "Garvotsav" (translates to: A Festival of Pride) which was a week-long event which wrapped up with the Pride march on 26 March 2017. The festival included a flash mob, plays, film screenings, seminars and other events to encourage open discussion. The march was organised by Saksham Trust and Alankar Theatre Chandigarh with support from the Canadian embassy.

=== 2018 ===
The 2018 Chandigarh Pride Week "Garvotsav" celebrations began on 12 March and ended with the Pride March on 18 March 2018. The event was organised by Saksham Trust and Nazariya Foundation, a short film productions company. The Canadian Embassy also co-sponsored the celebrations for the second consecutive year.

=== 2019 ===
The 2019 Chandigarh Pride Week "Garvotsav" starting earlier than previous years, 25 February, ended with a pride march on 3 March 2019. More than 250 people attended the pride march from Punjab University to Sector 17. With this year a special focus on transgender sexual identity acceptance, the walk was organized by Mangalmukhi transgender welfare society and Saksham trust. The pride week got co-funded by the Canadian embassy for the third consecutive year. Several other organisations, Humsafar trust, Harmless Hugs, FPAI and Keshav Suri Foundation collaborated with the NGOs for the walk.
