= Queer Gulabi Pride Jaipur =

LGBT event in Jaipur, India

Queer Gulabi Pride Jaipur is an annual LGBT pride walk held in Jaipur, Rajasthan. It was first organized in March 2015 by Nai Bhor Sanstha, a community-based organization that has been advocating for LGBT rights and development for over 15 years.

== History ==
=== 2015 ===
The first Queer Gulabi Pride was held on 1 March 2015, organized by Nai Bhor Sanstha. The walk began at Chomu House Circle at 4:00 PM and ended at Statue Circle, covering a distance of approximately one kilometre. The inaugural pride walk saw around 100 participants marching in support of LGBT rights.

This march served as a call to action, urging both the Union and state governments to amend laws that would allow transgender individuals to access welfare schemes, such as the Mahatma Gandhi National Rural Employment Guarantee Scheme (MGNREGA).

Following the April 2014 Supreme Court ruling on transgender rights, the community marched to highlight concerns over the lack of legal protections and social inclusion for transgender individuals.

=== 2016 ===
The second Queer Gulabi Pride was held on 3 April 2016 and was organized by Nai Bhor Sanstha.

Approximately 150 to 200 people participated in the march. The parade route extended from Chomu House Circle to Shaheed Smarak.

=== 2017 ===
The third Queer Gulabi Pride, organized by Nai Bhor Sanstha, was held on 5 March 2017. The walk began at 3:00 PM, following a route from Shaheed Smarak to Albert Hall, passing through MI Road, Panch Bhatti, Ajmeri Gate, New Gate, and Ram Niwas Bagh.

=== 2024 ===
The 2024 Queer Gulabi Pride march was held on 28 January 2024, following a route from the Jaipur Police Commissionerate to Albert Hall.
