= Queerythm =

Indian queer organization

- Queerythm LGBTIQ Community
- Formation: 18 May 2017; 7 years ago
- Founder: Prijith P K
- Type: Community Based Organization
- Registration no.: TVM/TC/461/2017
- Purpose: Queer Rights, Inclusive & Intersectional Space
- Headquarters: Thiruvananthapuram, Kerala, India
- President: Prijith P K
- Vice President: Bharathan Iyer
- Secretary: Syama S Prabha
- Website: Queerythm

Queerythm is a registered community-based organization for queer people based in Thiruvananthapuram, Kerala, India. The organisation hosts the pride events in the capital city of Kerala.

== History ==
The organisation started as a support group with regular monthly meetings for queer people. It was registered as a community-based organization on 18 May 2017 under the Travancore-Cochin Literary, Scientific and Charitable Societies Registration Act of 1955.

== Purpose ==
The organisation aims for a society free of discrimination against gender and sexual minorities.

== Cultural activities ==
=== Library ===
Queerythm launched a campaign to collect books for a library. The organisation plans to collect at least 2000 books, which will allow them to register at district library council.

=== Theatre ===
Queerythm launched a queer theatre group called Q-Rang during the 2019 pride events for two reasons. Firstly, the theatre offers a therapeutic experience for queer people who have experienced severe stigma and help them in accepting themselves. Secondly, such platforms give them a certain degree of visibility, which can aid ensuring social acceptance.

=== Pride events ===
==== 2020 ====
Queerythm organised the third pride event in the capital city of Kerala with the motto of growing beyond the individual and to the heart of the family, drawing family members of queer people. The 2020 events included a pride march, a gender awareness programme and cultural shows.

==== 2019 ====
Queerythm organised the 2019 pride events in the capital city of Kerala. The events included a pride march led by Kunnukuzhy Councillor Binu I.P, a cultural festival at Manaveeyam Veedhi inaugurated by cinema and theatre actor Archana Padmini and the launching of the queer theatre group Q-Rang.

It was the first Indian pride event to observe the green protocol by avoiding plastic and other non-biodegradables. The organisation relied on handmade cloth banners, paper flags and paper posters.

== Activism ==
=== Public interest litigation ===
==== Queerythm vs National Medical Commission ====
On 25 August 2021, Queerythm, along with the Malappuram-based queer organisation Dhisha filed a petition against National Medical Commission and Undergraduate Medical Education Board for unscientific, discriminatory, and derogatory content in the textbook prescribed for MBBS in Kerala High Court. The petitioners pointed out that they had already given representations to the commission and the board for removing the unscientific content from the medical textbooks, but the authorities took no action.

On 7 September 2021, Kerala High Court directed Undergraduate Medical Education Board to consider the removal of unscientific, discriminatory, and derogatory content without delay.

=== Campaign ===
==== Anti-cyber bullying campaign ====
Queerythm collaborated with Blued, a gay social networking app, to launch an anti-cyberbullying campaign for queer people. The campaign raised awareness about catfishing, harassment and necessary safety measures and founded helpline numbers to report such incidents.

== Research ==
=== Conversion therapy ===
Queerythm supported Dr Sreya Mariyam Salim in her postgraduate research for Government Medical College, Thiruvananthapuram. The study found that 45% of queer persons in Kerala have been subjected to conversion therapy.
