= Kerala Queer Pride =

Annual LGBT event in Kerala

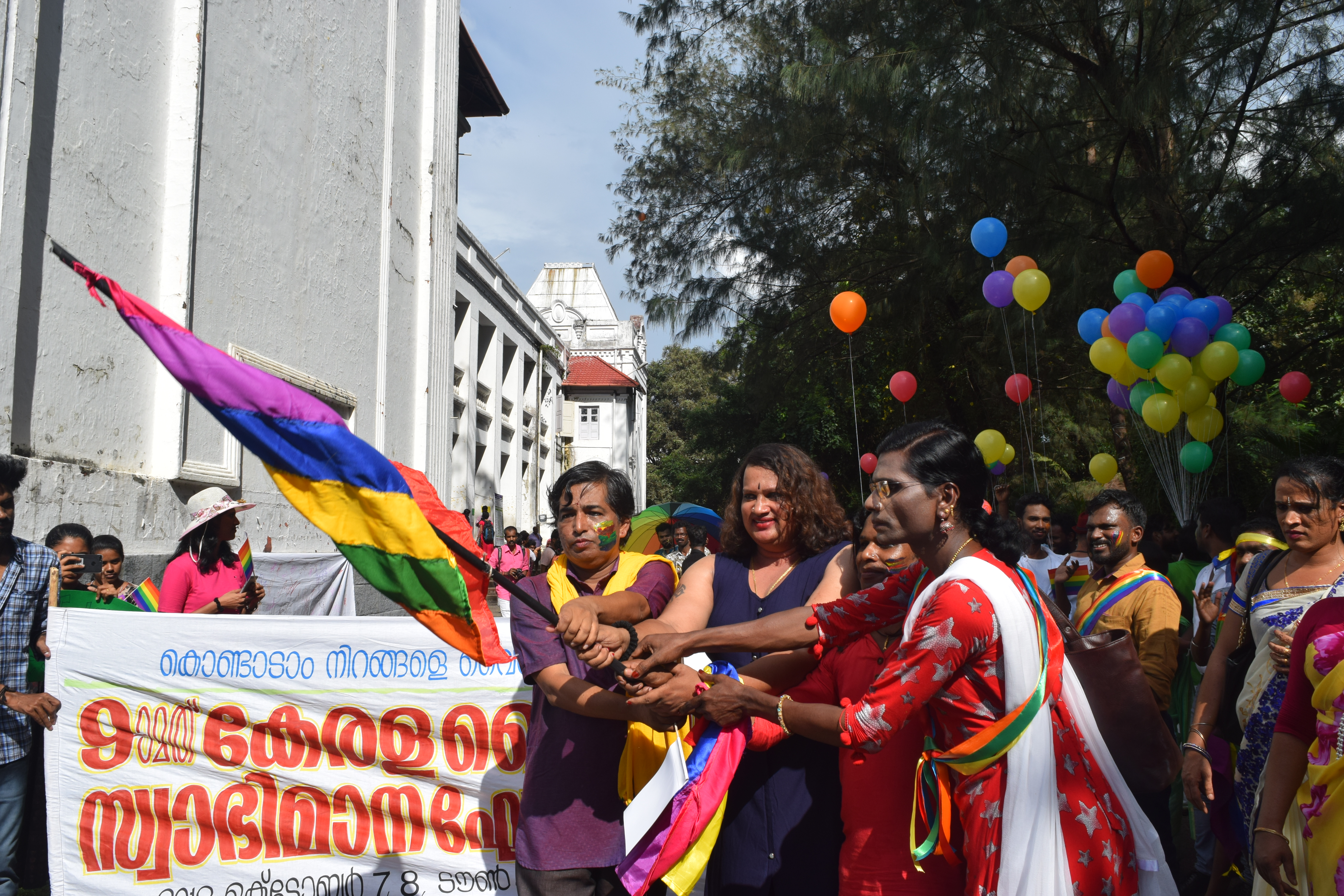
- Kerala Queer Pride March at Thrissur 2018
- Genre: Pride parade
- Frequency: Annually
- Location: Kerala
- Country: India
- Years active: 2010-present
- Inaugurated: 2010; 16 years ago
- Most recent: 2024

Kerala Queer Pride is an annual pride parade and associated series of events held in the Indian state of Kerala to celebrate the diversity of sexual orientations and gender identities. The event serves as a platform for LGBTQIA+ communities and their allies to advocate for equal rights, social acceptance, and visibility. It typically includes public marches, cultural programs, panel discussions, film screenings, and community outreach activities. There was initially a perception that the Pride March was for the 'trans community', but it has since been attended by gays, lesbians, all other LGBTQ+ groups, and other LGBT supporters. Queer Pride Kerala is an independent, non-profit initiative for queer rights and unity, according to their Facebook page.

== History ==
Kerala Queer Pride began in 2010 as part of a broader movement for LGBTQIA+ visibility and rights in India. First Kerala Queer Pride march was held at Thrissur on July 2, 2010. Kerala Queer Pride later become a platform for sexual minorities to come together.

== Editions ==
=== Kerala Queer Pride 2010 ===
The first Kerala Queer Pride March was held in Thrissur on July 2, 2010, to mark the first anniversary of the Delhi High Court verdict that legalized homosexuality. The motto of the 2010 Queer Pride March, which was attended by approximately 500 people, was 'From Silence to Celebration'.

=== Kerala Queer Pride 2011 ===
The second edition of Kerala Queer Pride was also held at Thrissur.

=== Kerala Queer Pride 2012 ===
Although it was announced that the Queer Pride March, which was held in Thrissur in the first two years, would be held in Thrissur as usual, later on, following the silence of previous organizers of Kerala Queer Pride, a queer pride march was organized in Kozhikode on 26 July 2012 under the leadership of Malabar Cultural Forum (MCF).

=== Kerala Queer Pride 2013 ===
The 4th annual queer pride march was held at Thrissur on July 2, 2013. About 300 members participated in the march that started from Vidyarthi Corner and ended at Kerala Sahithya Akadami.

=== Kerala Queer Pride 2014 ===
5th Kerala Queer pride march was held in Kochi on July 26, 2014. The march was organised by the Queer Pride Keralam Group, which includes Queerala, a support group for the LGBT community, and Sahayathrika, a human rights organisation for lesbian and bisexual women in Kerala, and others who support LGBT community.

=== Kerala Queer Pride 2015 ===
The sixth edition of the Kerala Queer Pride march was held on August 12, 2015, at Kozhikode.

=== Kerala Queer Pride 2016 ===
The seventh edition of the queer pride parade held in Kozhikode on August 13, 2016. Parade started from Kozhikode Beach and concluded at Tagore Hall. Then Thrithala MLA V. T. Balram inaugurated the parade.

=== Kerala Queer Pride 2017 ===
The 8th Kerala Queer Pride 2017 was held in Kochi on August 12, 2017. The procession started from Vanchi Square in Menaka and ended at Maharaja's College Auditorium. Apart from the public meeting, seminars, cultural programs, film screenings, and discussions also held as part of this.

=== Kerala Queer Pride 2018 ===
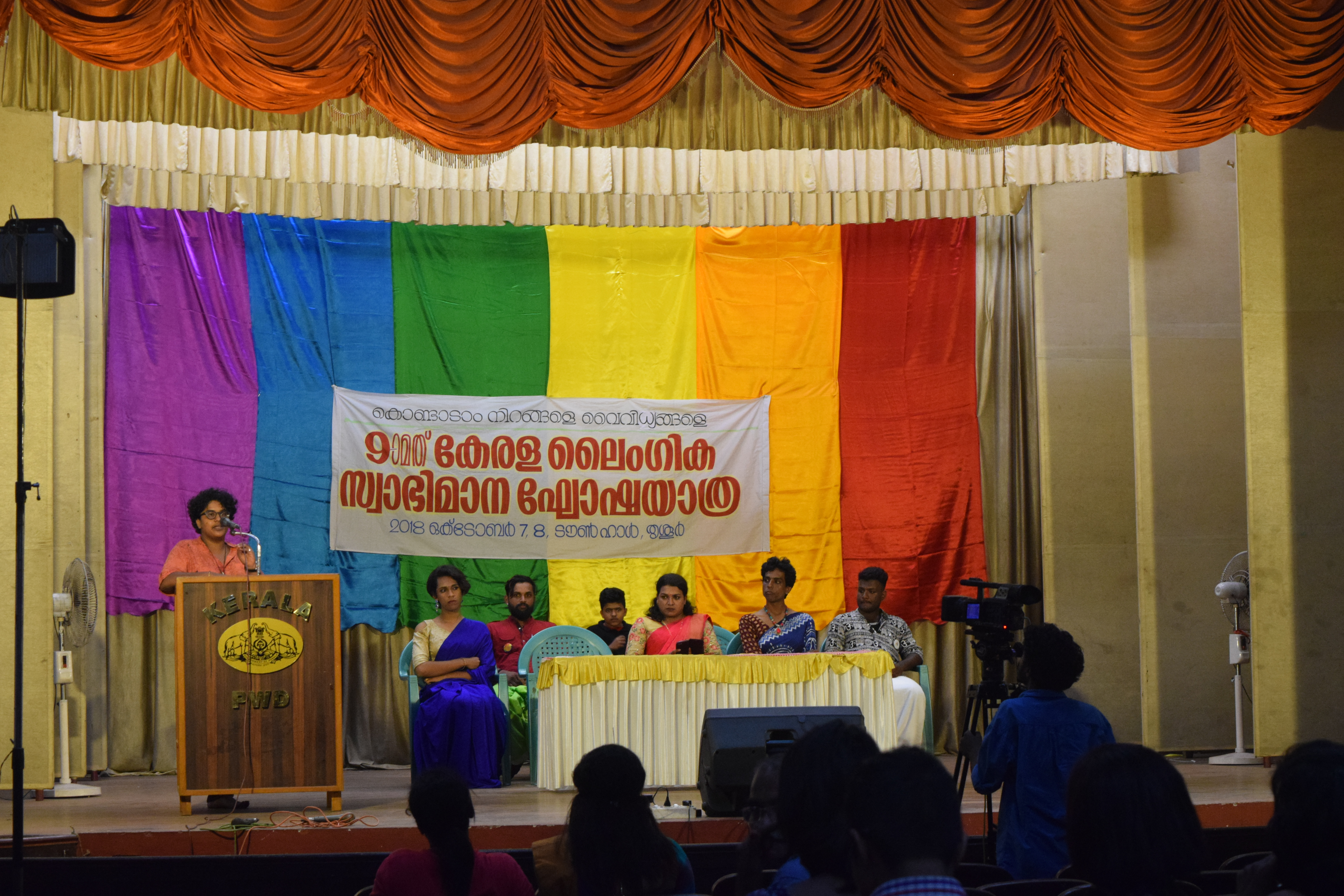
9th Kerala Queer Pride public meeting

9th edition of the Kerala Queer Pride march was held in Thrissur on October 7, 2018. Manaveeyam Queer rally, a precursor to the 9th Kerala Queer Pride march, was held in Thiruvananthapuram on August 12, 2018.

=== Kerala Queer Pride 2019 ===
The 10th Queer Pride March of the state was held at Kochi, on November 20, 2019.

=== Kerala Queer Pride 2020&2021 ===
Kerala Queer Pride parade was cancelled in 2020 and 2021 due to the COVID-19 pandemic in India.

=== Kerala Queer Pride 2022 ===
The 11th edition of the Kerala Queer Pride was held at Kollam, on September 16–18, 2022. Along with the Queer Pride parade, art exhibition, documentary screening, public meeting and cultural programmes were also organised. The event was inaugurated by father of Anannyah Kumari Alex, a social activist who was the first transgender to contest assembly elections in the state, who later committed suicide.

=== Kerala Queer Pride 2023 ===
The 12th Kerala Queer Pride was held in Malappuram on 28 and 29 October. The first day saw an art exhibition and discussions on three topics, while the second day saw discussions, a Queer Pride march, a closing ceremony and cultural programmes. On the closing day, a DJ show by DJ Pete held on the open stage of the Malappuram Town Hall. The event was titled Malappuram Mazhavil Monchil Thilangum. The march scheduled for September was postponed following Nipah outbreak in Kozhikode.

The logo of the 12th pride march was inspired by 'Islamic Geometry Art'. The Queer Pride group had said that the logo would send a message that Queer Pride Kerala's politics are against 'queerphobia' and 'Islamophobia'.

Opposition to the organizers of the event, which is being held for the first time in Malappuram, and the event itself, has been raised from many quarters. An organization called Youth Empowerment Society of Kerala (YES Kerala) has put up hoardings against the event at various places in the district.

=== Kerala Queer Pride 2024 ===
the 13th edition of the Kerala Queer Pride was held in Thiruvananthapuram, on October 17–20, 2024. The event featured panel discussions on LGBTQIA+ community rights, a student meet, film screenings, a DJ night, an exhibition by queer artists, stalls by queer entrepreneurs, and a Pride March starting from the Kerala Government Secretariat and ending at Manaveeyam Veedhi on October 20 at different venues in the city like Bharat Bhavan, Gandhi Park, and Manaveeyam Veedhi. As a part of the event, the first-ever Queer-Trans Student Meet-Up was organized at Bharat Bhavan.
