= Sappho for Equality =

- Founded: 2003
- Purpose: LGBT
- Location: Kolkata, India
- Region served: Eastern India
- Method: support services, arts, advocacy
- Website: www.sapphokolkata.in

Sappho for Equality is an organization based in Kolkata, India, working for the rights of lesbians, bisexual women, and trans men in Eastern India.

It focuses on community empowerment and support, engagement with civil society and other organizations, and advocacy and lobbying.

== History ==
Sappho for Equality was founded out of Sappho, an organization established in June 1999 by three middle-class Bengali lesbian couples, inspired by the 1996 film Fire. The organization was named after the 6th century Greek poet.

According to Sappho for Equality's website, Sappho worked to "provide safe space and emotional support for sexually marginalized women and female to male transpersons," but moved on to "rights/justice based framework to fight homophobia, discrimination and violence against LBT persons."

Core members of Sappho founded Sappho for Equality in 2003, focusing on activism and public outreach.

According to Sappho for Equality's website, "Sappho today exists parallel to Sappho for Equality as the LBT community based informal support group.") According to Srila Roy in OUPblog, "Members of Sappho are automatically members of SFE, but not the other way round. Sappho embodies, in this way, two common strands of the queer movement in India—one that links sexuality to identity (the support group) and one that attempts to break this very association (the activist platform)."

== Work ==
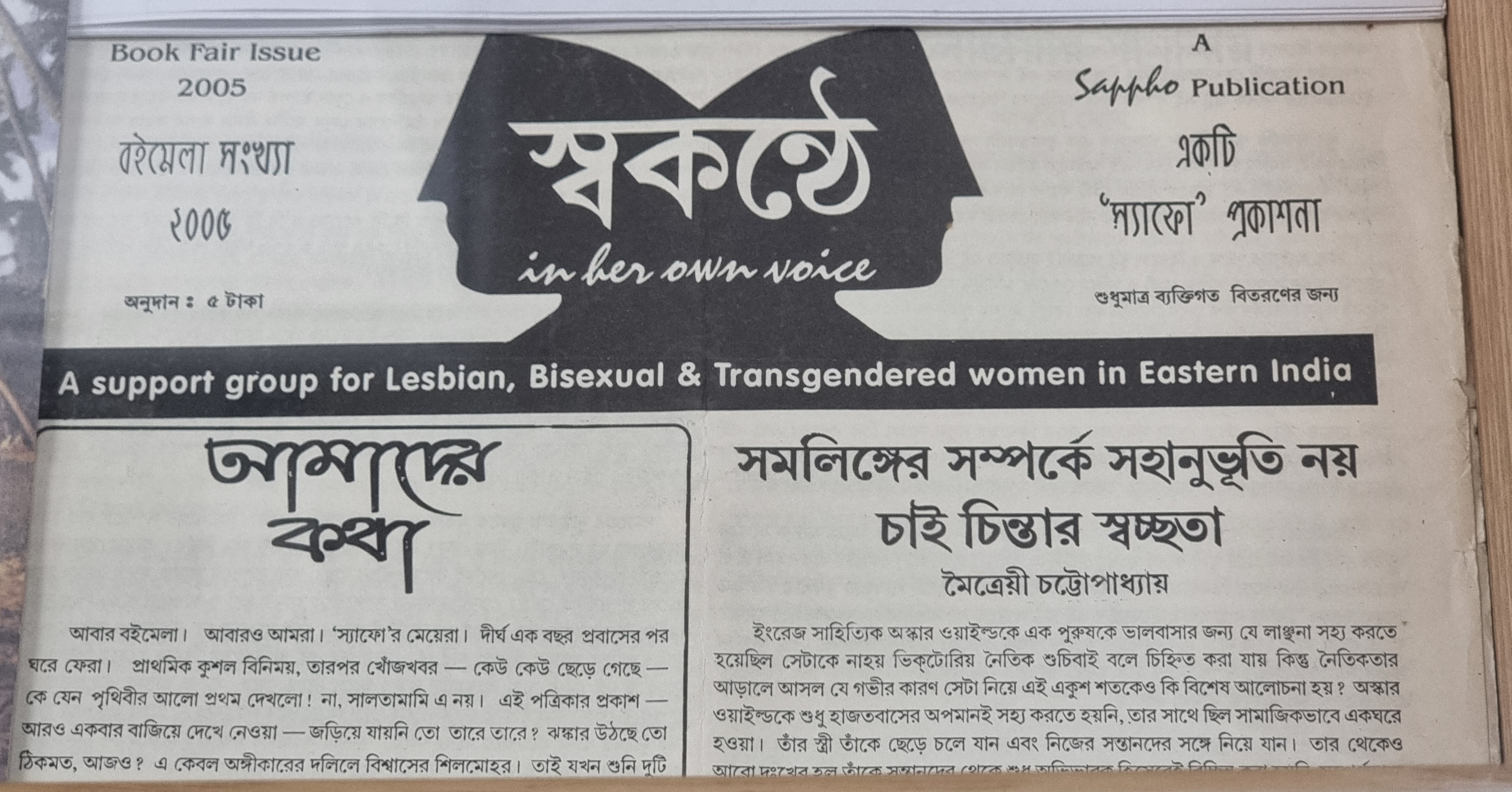
2005 Sappho for Equality publication, Archives Recherches Cultures Lesbiennes

Sappho for Equality's community support work includes offering peer counseling, running a helpline and counseling service, and conducting workshops. As of 2013, its helpline received seven calls a day.

It runs an annual "Sexuality Academy", works with students, participates in the Kolkata Book Fair, documents issues like lesbian suicides, and does advocacy work on issues like Section 377, in addition to working with police, medical students, and medical practitioners.

Sappho for Equality organizes Dialogues, an annual LGBT film and video festival established in 2007.

It publishes Swakanthey, a magazine described by Scroll.in as "a biannual, bilingual six-page newsletter of academic articles, non-fiction stories and poetry," established in 2004.

In 2023 the organisation opened Porshi, a canteen located in Kolkata, Jodhpur Park. The venue provides a safe place for LGBT individuals, and offers reduced cost food and venue hiring.

== See also ==
- LGBT rights in India
- Homosexuality in India
- LGBT culture in India
