= Sahayathrika =

Kerala LGBT organization

Sahayatrika is an organization catering to AFAB(Assigned Female at Birth) community of Kerala origin. The name is a Malayalam word meaning "Women fellow-travelers".

The organization mainly works on counselling, community-organizing and survival of AFAB community from gender and sexual minorities. It was started by Canadian immigrant Malayali Deepa Vasudevan. The organisation also collaborates on LGBT public awareness-building programs.

Sahayatrika was formed in the backdrop of rising lesbian suicide rates at a certain point in time in Kerala. Initial discussions on Sahayathrika happened in 2001. The first project, in association with a mental health organization, FIRM, was started in 2002. In 2008, Sahayatrika became an independent registered organization.

The organisation celebrated its 20th anniversary in 2022 by organising a grand function titled Idam, inaugurated by Minister of Higher Education and Social Justice, R. Bindu and attended by prominent personalities and activists including actress Shakeela.
