= Queerala =

Malayali LGBTIQ organisation

Queerala, a registered community-based organization (CBO) for Malayali LGBTQ people, gives adequate support to Malayali persons who belong to the sexual and gender minorities. Queerala originally started in May 2013 as a private Facebook page where closeted LGBTQ community members met online. Since its start of operations, Queerala has been an active platform for the rights of the LGBTQ community in Kerala and India and focuses on various awareness campaigns on sexual orientation, gender identity/expression, and sex characteristics (SOGIESC). Queerala's representatives have been marking its presence in areas of literature, art, cultural spaces, and academic discourses as well as conducting case studies on issues pertaining to sexual orientation and gender identity. They also focus on sensitization on SOGIESC inclusive healthcare services, educational curriculum, workplace policies, and local self-governance.

== Major operations ==
=== Legal support ===
Queerala, with its association with human rights-friendly lawyers, supports LGBTQ persons who seek legal aid for various human rights concerns.

=== Peer counselling and helpline ===
Queerala's helpline is operational and aids queer persons to get connected with peer persons, counselors, psychiatrists, etc. Queerala has helped start multiple LGBTQ support groups in colleges. By 2018, two such recognised student groups were set up:

1) Umeed in IIM Kozhikode

2) Coming Out Club at Central University of Kerala, Kasaragod.

Queerala Helpline : +91 7012503861

==== Case studies and research ====
Queerala encourages and support research enthusiasts, who follow ethical practices of research methodology, to take up qualitative studies pertaining to LGBTQ lives.

==== Engagement with faith groups ====
Considering the challenges faced by most LGBTIQ persons from the faith and sexuality, Queerala engages with various faith-based collectives like NCCI (National Council of Churches in India) for dialogues on Inclusive Churches, Faith versus sexuality, etc.

== Projects ==
=== Wiki Loves Pride: LGBT Edit-a-thon ===
A one-day program organized in collaboration with the Wikimedia India Chapter, the edit-a-thon enabled its participants to include LGBT-related articles and terminologies in Wikipedia, both in Malayalam and English.

=== Homomorphism ===
==== Homomorphism I ====
Homomorphism is an art attempt by team Queerala to bring the less-depicted notions of same-sex intimacy. The first edition of Homomorphism had around 70 artworks by 5 Malayali Queer artists

==== Homomorphism II ====
Homomorphism II was a follow-up to the first edition of the art project by Queerala, and the second edition focused on same-sex desire and the social positions associated with same-sex lovers. Held at the Kerala Museum, Homomorphism II had 7 participating artists.

=== Quest 2016 ===
Quest 2016 was a two-day national seminar held at the Center for Development Studies, Thiruvananthapuram. The seminar had dialogues on Queer lives and paper presentations by researchers from across India

=== Q-Loid 2019 ===
Q-Loid was a one-day LGBTQ film festival organized by Queerala in July, 2019. Along with queer-themed film screenings, the event also had panel discussions on related topics. The festival venue was Kerala Museum, Kochi.

== Etymology ==
"Queerala" gets its name from "Queer" + "Kerala." The community emphasizes creating awareness in society regarding LGBTQ issues, with a focus on queer lives in Kerala.
