= Manaveeyam Veedhi =

Road in Thiruvananthapuram, India

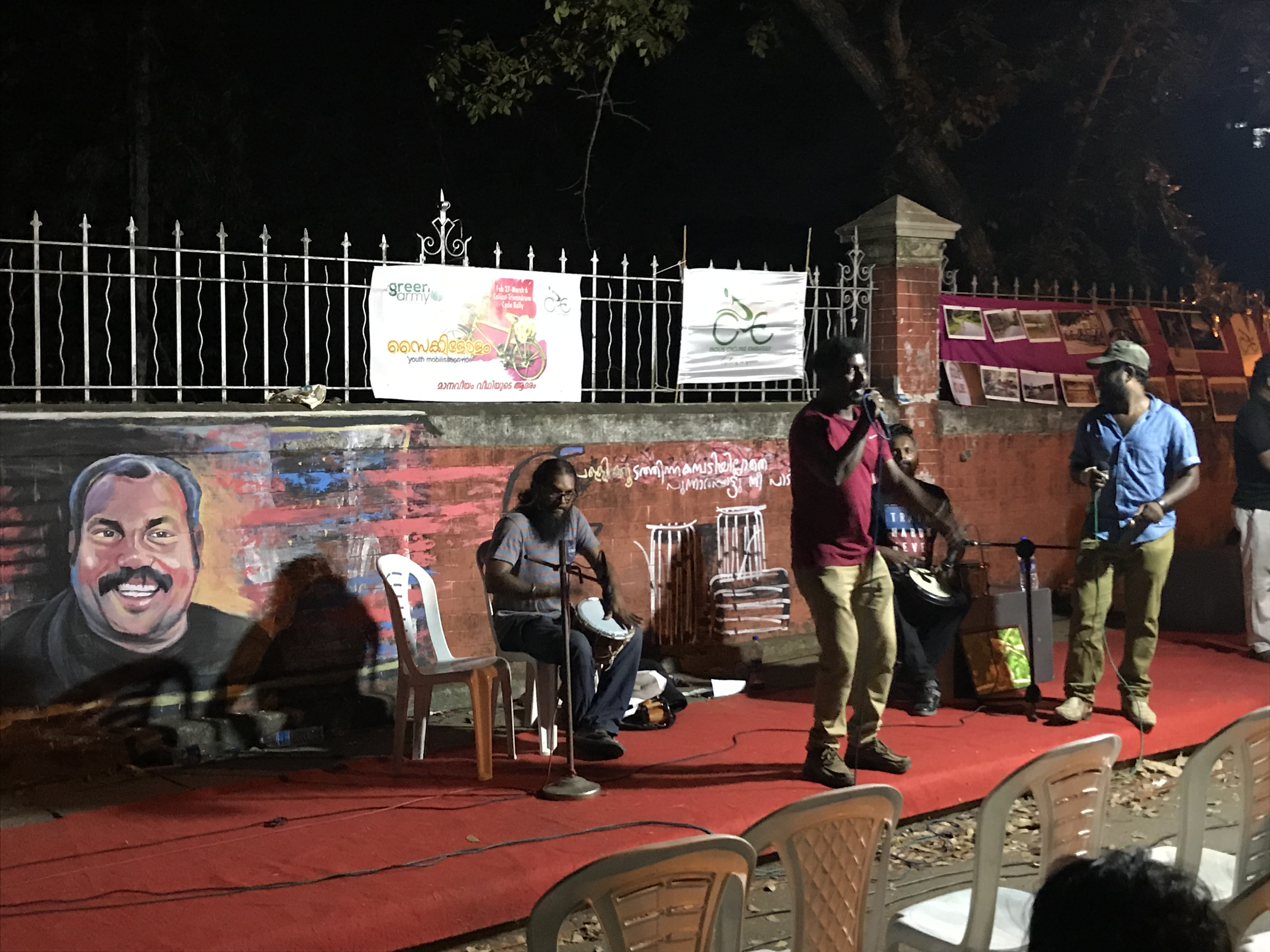
Scene from a concert in honor of Kalabhavan Mani at Manaveeyam Veedhi in March, 2019. A wall-painting of Mani is also seen in the background.

Manaveeyam Veedhi, also known as Manaveeyam Road, is a Road in Thiruvananthapuram. This 180 m road extending from the statue of Vayalar Ramavarma on the Museum-Vellayambalam road to the statues of G. Devarajan and P. Bhaskaran at Althara junction, is famous for the numerous artworks on display along the road and the numerous cultural performances it hosts. Street theatre performances, exhibitions, and art festivals are often hosted on this road.

The history of hosting cultural events at Manaveeyam Veedhi can be traced back to as early as 1995 when street plays were regularly held at this location. In 2001, the then Assembly Speaker M. Vijayakumar inaugurated this road as a center for cultural programs. In 2011, as a part of its Manaveeyam project, the Government of Kerala started organizing cultural events at Manaveeyam Veedhi. Initially it hosted only theater performances. Performances of a number of plays of G. Sankara Pillai have been hosted here. Later on, many cultural icons from Kerala, including O. N. V. Kurup, Adoor Gopalakrishnan, and Sugathakumari participated in events on this road. A number of famous artists from Kerala including Artist Namboothiri have also created works of art on the walls along the road.

In 2013, a neermathalam tree was planted on this road in memory of the late writer Kamala Surayya poet and activist Sugathakumari. Women's groups have often gathered at this location to pursue artistic endeavors, and to express their concerns and protests over various issues. They were concerned because this place is more related to the western lifestyle.

As a part of the Smart Roads project, the road was dug up for construction work and was closed to traffic for over two years.

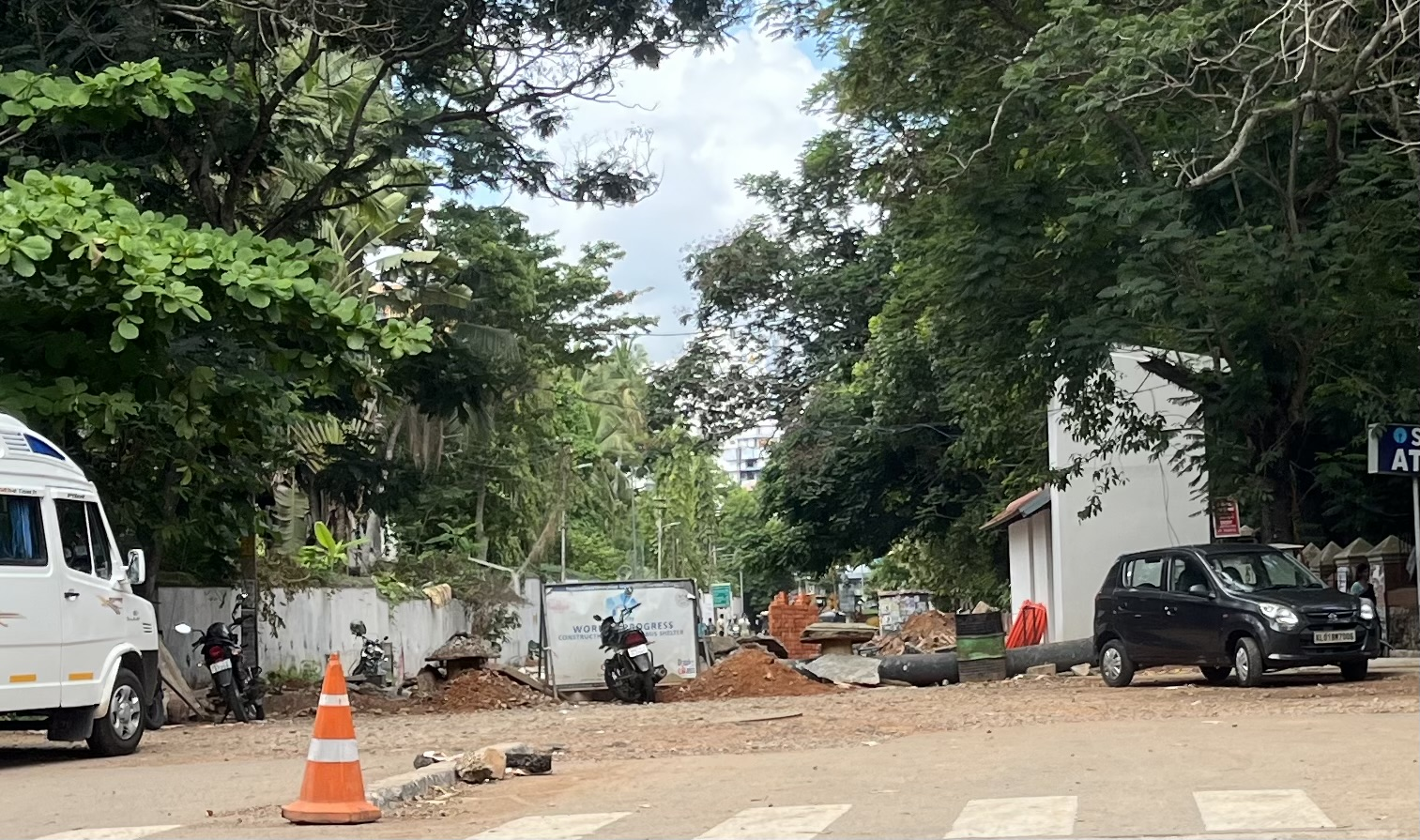
Road work blocking entrance to Manaveeyam Veedhi, June 2023
