= Delhi Queer Pride Parade =

Annual LGBT event in Delhi

- Genre: Pride parade
- Frequency: Annual
- Location: Delhi
- Country: India
- Years active: 2008–present
- Inaugurated: June 30, 2008
- Most recent: February 8, 2026

4th annual Delhi Queer Pride Parade, November 2011

Delhi Queer Pride Parade is an annual pride parade in Delhi, India. First held in 2008, it is organised by members of the Delhi Queer Pride Committee and has generally been held the last Sunday of November. The parade usually runs from Barakhamba Road through Tolstoy Marg to Jantar Mantar.

Since its inception in 2008, where some hundreds gathered in central Delhi to celebrate the first public Pride parade, the community-funded march has grown to become a strong movement that primarily addressed Section 377 of the Indian Penal Code, which has since been repealed.

The Delhi Queer Pride has maintained independent operations and have chosen to rely on community funding and rejecting any kind of corporate sponsorship, with the aim to focus this unique collective on equal rights, privacy and freedom. The organisation also supports dalit rights, disability rights and the feminist movements.

== History ==
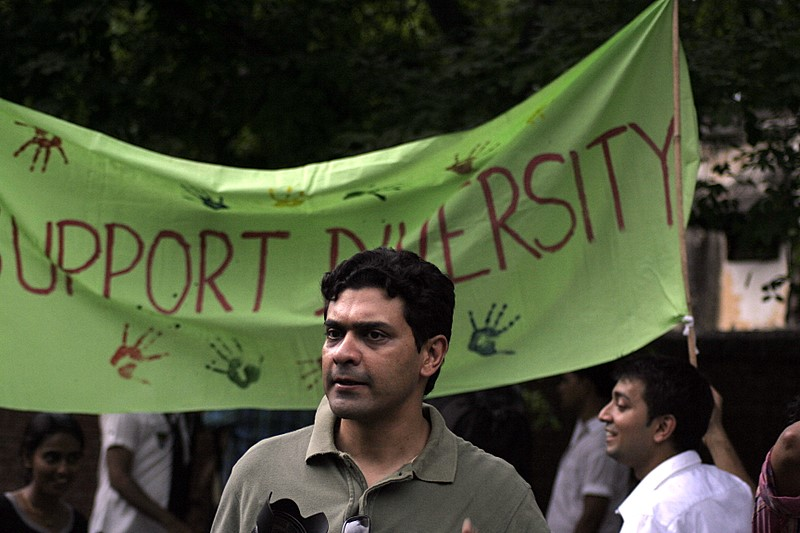
First Pride Parade in Delhi

=== 2008 ===
Delhi's first Queer Pride March took place on 30 June 2008. In the beginning, only a small bunch of men and women arrived, and police was also there. By evening, there were about 500 people singing, dancing, shouting slogans, holding placards, screaming "377, quit India".

The first ever parade was attended by 500 marchers, who carried rainbow-coloured flags and "Queer Dilliwalla" banners marched to bhangra beats. The parade began from Barakhamba road in the heart of the city's business district and went on till Jantar Mantar, an 18th-century astronomical observatory.

=== 2009 ===
The second Delhi Queer Pride was held on 28 June 2009, and was attended by over 2000 people. It took about two months to organise the march, according to queer activist and key event organiser Lesley A Esteves.

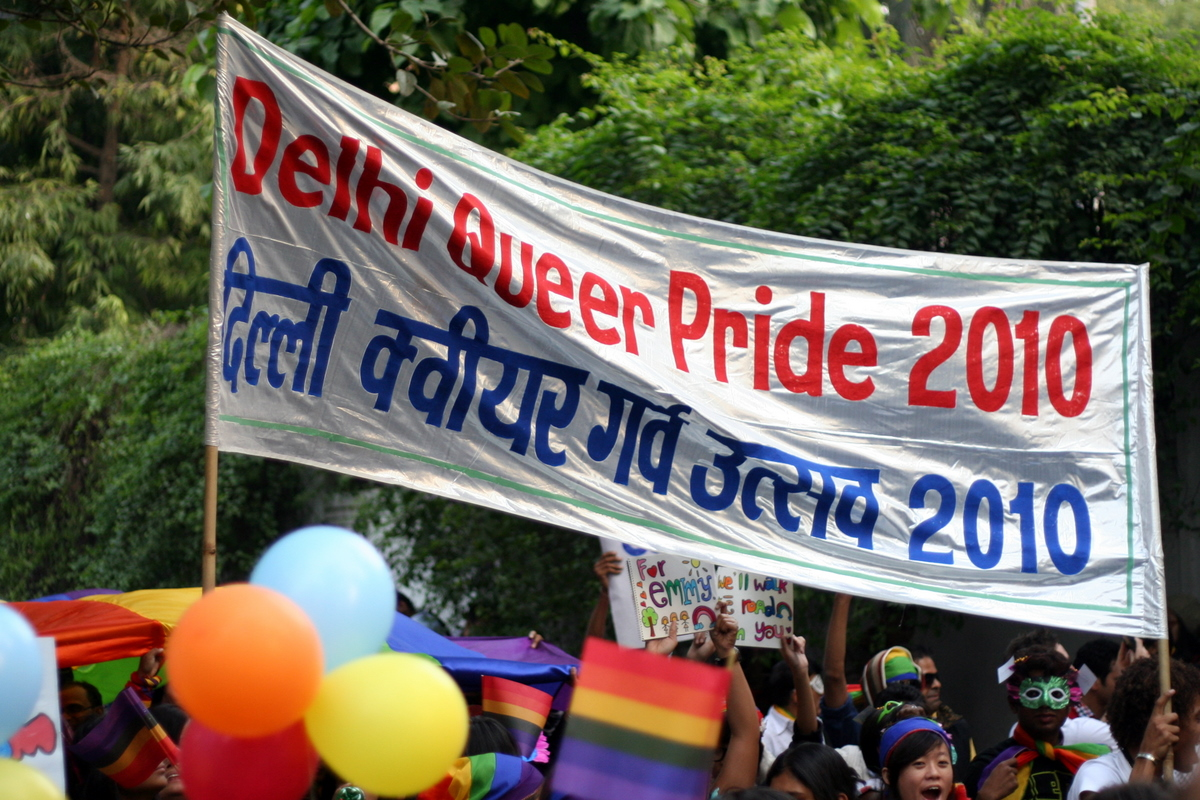
Delhi Queer Pride parade banner

=== 2010 ===
The third Delhi Queer Pride was held on 28 November 2010. More than 3500 people attended, including grandparents and family members of the LGBT community. This pride parade was a celebration on the account of the repealing of section 377 on the 2nd of July 2009, on account of the public interest litigations (PIL) files by Naaz Foundation.

=== 2011 ===
The fourth Delhi Queer Pride was held on 27 November 2011. The march ended in Jantar Mantar with a reading of the "Charter of Demands for LGBT Rights" and a two-minute silence for those who died in the recent Nand Nagri fire tragedy.

=== 2012 ===
The fifth Delhi Queer Pride was held on 25 November 2012, followed by a picnic near India Gate. The theme for this march was Gender Variance and Identity and Expression.

=== 2013 ===
The sixth Delhi Queer Pride was held on 24 November 2013. Around 700 people marched from Barakhamba Road to Jantar Mantar. Many articles were published featuring the organiser, Mohnish Malhotra.

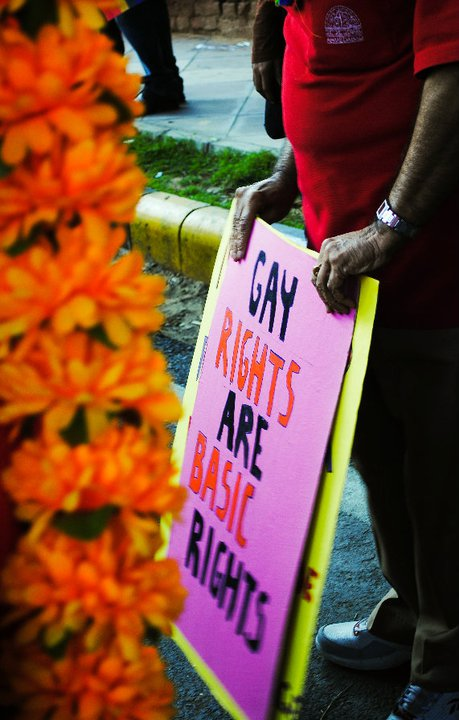
A poster at the 3rd Delhi Queer Pride in 2010

=== 2014 ===
The seventh Delhi Queer Pride, held on 30 November 2014, was the first pride march after the Supreme Court reinstated Section 377 of the Indian Penal code, which criminalises 'unnatural sex'. The community walked to reinforce their identities with this year's theme 'No going back.' Around 700 people danced and walked against Section 377.

=== 2015 ===
The eighth Delhi Queer Pride was held on 29 November and kickstarted from Tolstoy Marg at 2 PM. The march saw hundreds of LGBTQIA+ people and allies walk the two-km stretch from Barakhamba road to Jantar Mantar, ending with a range of performances. The statement this year talked about freedom not just from Section 377, but freedom from all social injustices.

=== 2016 ===
On 27 November 2016, the ninth Delhi queer pride took place on the streets of New Delhi from Barakhamba Road to Tolstoy Marg. This march saw a larger turnout, where about 800-1000 people turned up. Members of the LGBTQIA+ community as well friends and families came with placards, masks and costumes. This year's march demanded freedom and solidarity for Dalits, Muslims, women, disabled people, Kashmiris, people in the North-East, Adivasis, academics, filmmakers, and students.

=== 2017 ===
On 12 November 2017, Delhi hosted its tenth queer pride parade at from Barakhamba Road till Jantar Mantar. Hundreds of people gathered together to support the queer community and demand the repeal of Section 377. The demand was to build a proper system of hate crime legislation which conceptualizes all forms of violence against minorities as a punishable offence. They also demanded to repeal theKarnataka Police Act 36, Hyderabad Eunuch Act and remove the marital exception from the rape laws which should offer redressal to all victims/survivors of sexual assault irrespective of gender.

=== 2018 ===
Delhi Queer Pride 2018 was held on November 25, 2018. The march, like every year, started from Barakhambha Road.

This was the first Pride in Delhi after section 377 was read down by the Supreme Court of India, which decriminalised homosexuality. The energy and the enthusiasm was visible in the turnout, with more than 5,000 people from all walks of life marching.

A group of people danced their way under the nearly 15-metre-long pride rainbow flag, accompanied by dholakwalas. Participants in bright, colourful sarees and feathered head accessories posed with onlookers for selfies and videos, as they marched for more than four hours.

=== 2019 ===
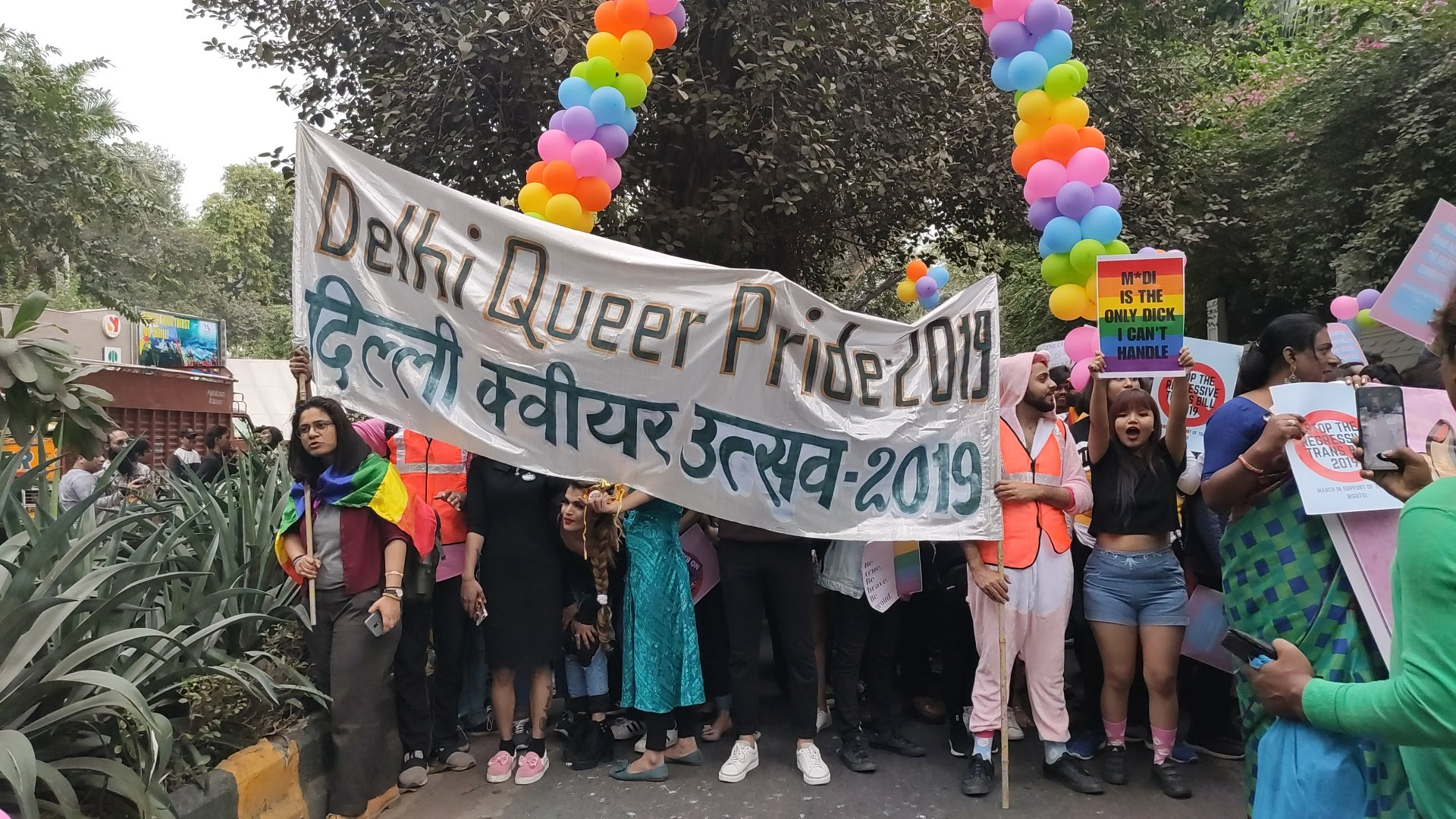
Marchers in Delhi on 24 November 2019

On 24 November 2019, members of the LGBTQ+ community people organised the parade where more than 1000 people joined.

=== 2020-21 ===
Because of COVID-19, the Delhi Queer Pride Parade in 2020 and 2021 was cancelled.

=== 2022-23 ===
Because of elections, and delay in permission, the 13th Delhi Pride was postponed from November, and was held on 9 January 2023.

It was the first offline Delhi Pride Parade after the COVID pandemic. Thousands of people marched from Barakhamba Road Metro Station and assembled near Jantar Mantar.

This pride parade happened during the time when the cases for recognition of same-sex marriages were pending in various regional courts and were collectively transferred to jurisdiction of Supreme Court by itself. Thus this parade emphasised on demands of recognition of same-sex marriages.

The number of people who participated was estimated to be around 12,000, significantly higher than previous years.

=== 2023-2024 ===
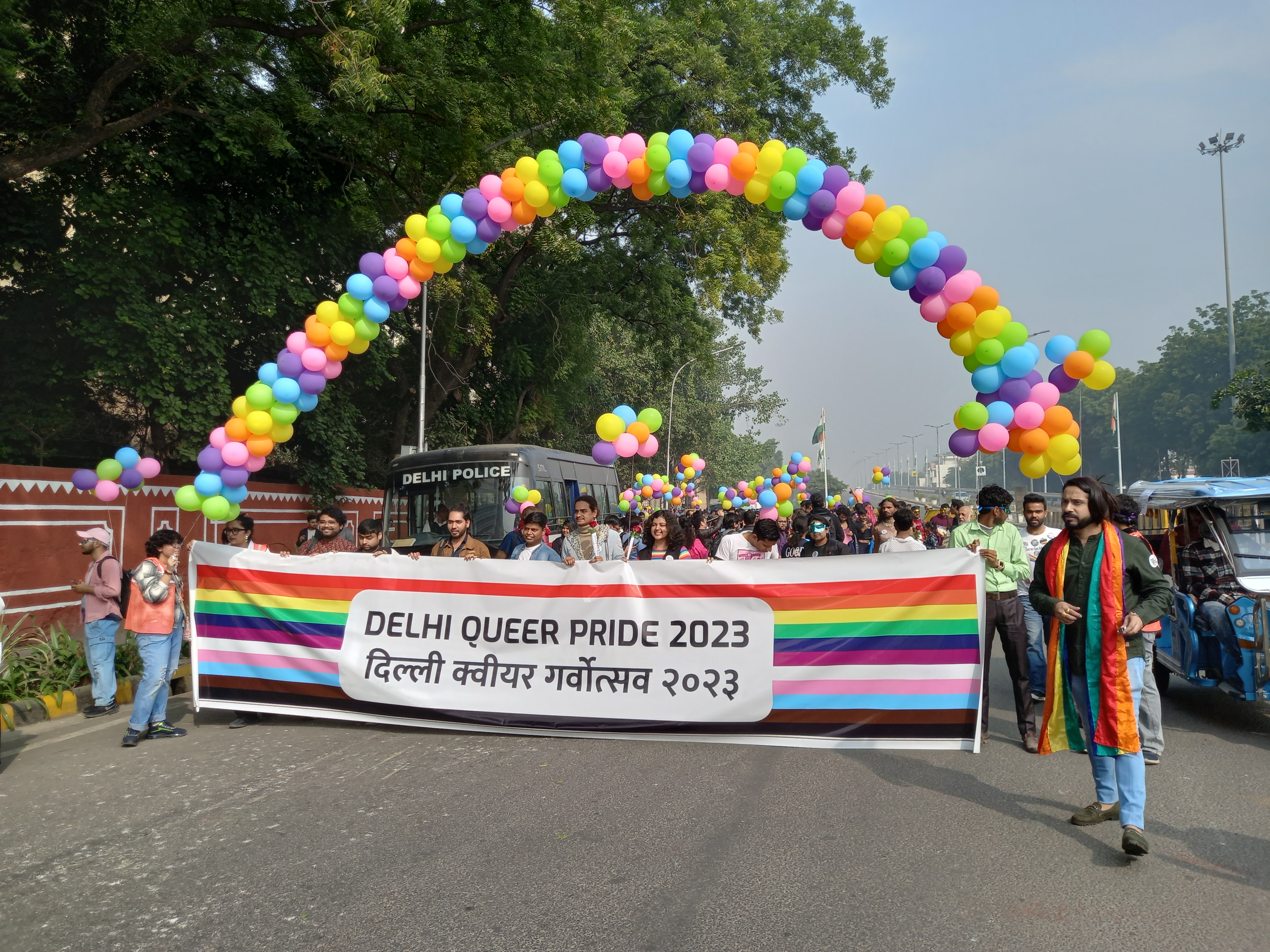
Marchers at the 2023 parade, held on 26 November, 2023

The 2023 parade started from Barakhamba Road and ended at Jantar Mantar. About 15,000 people participated.

A feeling of protest was present, reflecting the community's disappointment at a long-pending decision on same-sex marriage, which was released in the previous year. The march also included protesters speaking out for Palestine and calling for an arms embargo.

=== 2026 ===
On 8 February 2026, the 16th edition of the parade drew nearly a thousand participants.
