= LGBTQ rights in Karnataka =

Overview of LGBTQ rights in the Indian state of Karnataka

- Karnataka
- Legal status: Legal since 2018
- Gender identity: Third gender recognised; allowed to update gender on birth/death certificates per Karnataka HC
- Discrimination protections: Gender identity protected under federal law; Karnataka allows 1 % reservation in public jobs for transgender persons

Family rights
- Recognition of relationships: No recognition of same‑sex relationships
- Restrictions: Defined as opposite‑sex only
- Adoption: No

Lesbian, gay, bisexual, transgender, and queer (LGBTQ) rights in Karnataka are governed by federal Indian law—including Navtej Singh Johar v. Union of India (2018) and the Transgender Persons (Protection of Rights) Act (2019)—augmented by state-level policies and judicial rulings supporting transgender inclusion.

== History ==
Historical evidence from Karnataka reflects a nuanced understanding of gender and sexuality. Temples built by the Hoysalas at Belur, Halebidu, and Somanathapura (12th–13th century) contain sculptures depicting non-normative sexual expressions and fluid depictions of gender roles. These have been interpreted as cultural acknowledgment of diverse sexualities.

The 12th-century Virashaiva movement in Karnataka produced mystic poets like Akkamahadevi, who rejected traditional gender roles and described spiritual union with Lord Shiva in terms that defied binary gender identities. In regional performance traditions like Yakshagana, male artists historically took on female roles in elaborate costume and makeup. Though not necessarily linked to sexuality, these roles challenged normative gender binaries in public rituals. Jaimini Bharata, a 16th-century Kannada literary work written by poet Lakshmisha. It is a retelling of the Mahabharata, focusing on the story of Arjuna's son, Babhruvahana. The text includes episodes and characters that resonate with modern understandings of gender fluidity. One notable character is Shikhandi, who is born as a woman (previously Amba) and later transforms into a man to fulfill a vow of vengeance. Though rooted in mythological tradition, Shikhandi's narrative has been interpreted in contemporary scholarship as reflecting themes of gender transition and non-binary identity.

In the Vijayanagara kingdom, eunuchs were notably present, and the rulers even presented eunuchs as gifts to Islamic courts. It is also noted that in Vijayanagara Kingdom, the entry of man to the chambers of the Queen were prohibited except for the eunuchs.

Under British colonial rule, LGBTQ+ identities were legally and socially repressed. Section 377 of the Indian Penal Code (1861) criminalized homosexual acts as “against the order of nature.” This law was enforced across the Madras Presidency, which included parts of modern Karnataka. The Criminal Tribes Act of 1871 labeled many gender-nonconforming communities such as the Hijra as "criminals by birth", subjecting them to systemic policing and stigma. This was repealed in 1949. The Gulbarga Region of Karnataka was under the former State of Hyderabad, which had the Hyderabad Eunuchs Act targeting transgender people. While this law was later replaced by the Karnataka Police Act of 1963, it still inherited some provisons. This was overturned by the Karnataka Sexual Minorities Forum v. State of Karnataka in 2017, which replaced the term 'eunuch' with 'person'.

== Legal reforms & policy ==
Karnataka introduced a 1% horizontal reservation in public-sector jobs for transgender persons in July 2021, making it the first Indian state to do so. The Karnataka State Transgender Policy (2017) outlined measures on welfare, healthcare, education, housing, and anti-discrimination; however, years later it remains largely unimplemented.

In December 2024, the Karnataka High Court ruled that transgender persons may amend their birth and death certificates to reflect both previous and current gender/name, based on certificates issued under the 2019 Act—even without legislative amendments to the old 1969 law.

In Ms. X vs State of Karnataka (2024), the Karnataka HC made clear that official documents can and must be updated based on certificates issued under Sections 6 and 7 of the 2019 Act, even when the Registration of Births/Deaths Act (1969) does not allow it—reinforcing supremacy of special law. Higher authorities were directed to propose legislative amendments aligning the two laws.

=== Karnataka High Court petition on unequal tax treatment of same-sex partners ===
In October 2025, a same-sex couple, Anurag Kalia and Akhilesh Godi, filed a writ petition before the Karnataka High Court challenging the interpretation of Section 56(2)(x) of the Income Tax Act, 1961. The petition arose after one partner was advised that a valuable heirloom gifted by the other should be declared as taxable "income", since the statutory exemption under the fifth proviso applied only to “spouses” in heterosexual marriages.

The petitioners, represented by Dr. Dhruv Janssen-Sanghavi, contended that such exclusion violated the guarantees of equality before law and non-discrimination under Articles 14 and 15 of the Constitution of India. They sought a declaration that the word “spouse”, as used in the Income Tax Act, be interpreted in a gender-neutral and orientation-neutral manner. Alternatively, it was argued that the same tax benefit to same-sex partners in long-term, stable relationships to fulfil the guarantee of the equal protection of the laws in Article 14 of the Constitution of India.

The Karnataka High Court issued notices to the Union Government and the Income Tax Department to respond to the plea. The matter was listed for further hearing later in the year.

The final hearings of the case commenced on 10 March 2026. It has now been listed for further hearing on 25 March 2026 at 2:30pm before Justice S. Sunil Dutt Yadav.

== Recognition of relationships ==
Karnataka has not recognized same‑sex marriages, civil unions, or partnerships, and existing marriage laws remain heterosexual by default. In June 2023, the Karnataka High Court extended legal protection to a same-sex interfaith couple threatened by their families. While the court did not legally recognize gay marriage or partnerships, it affirmed that the couple deserves police protection and freedom to live together without harassment.

The Halakki Vokkaliga, an indigenous community from the Uttara Kannada district, have upheld a tradition of ceremonial same-sex marriages between women for so long that present-day members no longer recall its origins. One such ceremony, known in Kannada as daḍḍuve maduve, is conducted annually to honour Indra and to pray for rainfall that is neither excessive nor insufficient. The event features a wedding procession and rituals, with both brides dressed in saris, receiving blessings and gifts like in any other wedding. A recent instance of daḍḍuve maduve took place in 2022 at a Hindu temple dedicated to Ganesha, a deity held in special reverence by the Halakki Vokkaliga.

== Transgender Community ==
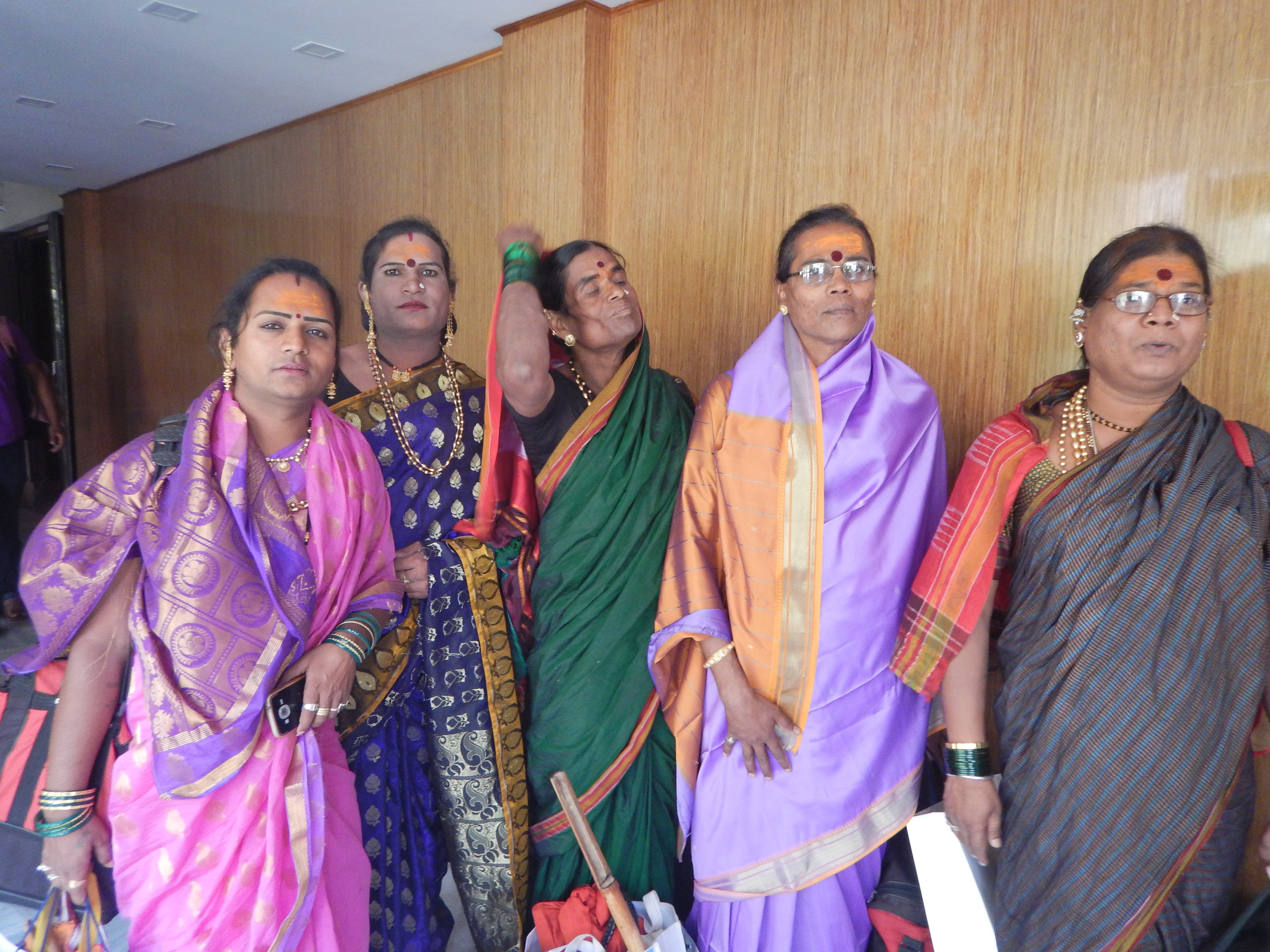
Jogappas at Bangalore

The Jogappas are a community of transgender people in Northern Karnataka. They are also present in parts of neighbouring Andhra Pradesh. They are associated with the goddess Renuka, whose major temple is the Yellamma Temple at Saundatti. Jogappas are male devotees of Renuka in female clothing. They are spiritually wedded to the goddess and lead their life serving the goddess. Transgender men as devotees of Yellamma have also been recorded and are referred to as Yellavva and Yellappa.

The transgender people are called kabjra in Karnataka and the transmale are called Gandabasaka (Gandubasakka) in Karnataka. According to the 2011 census, there are 20,266 transgender people in Karnataka.

== Societal attitudes ==
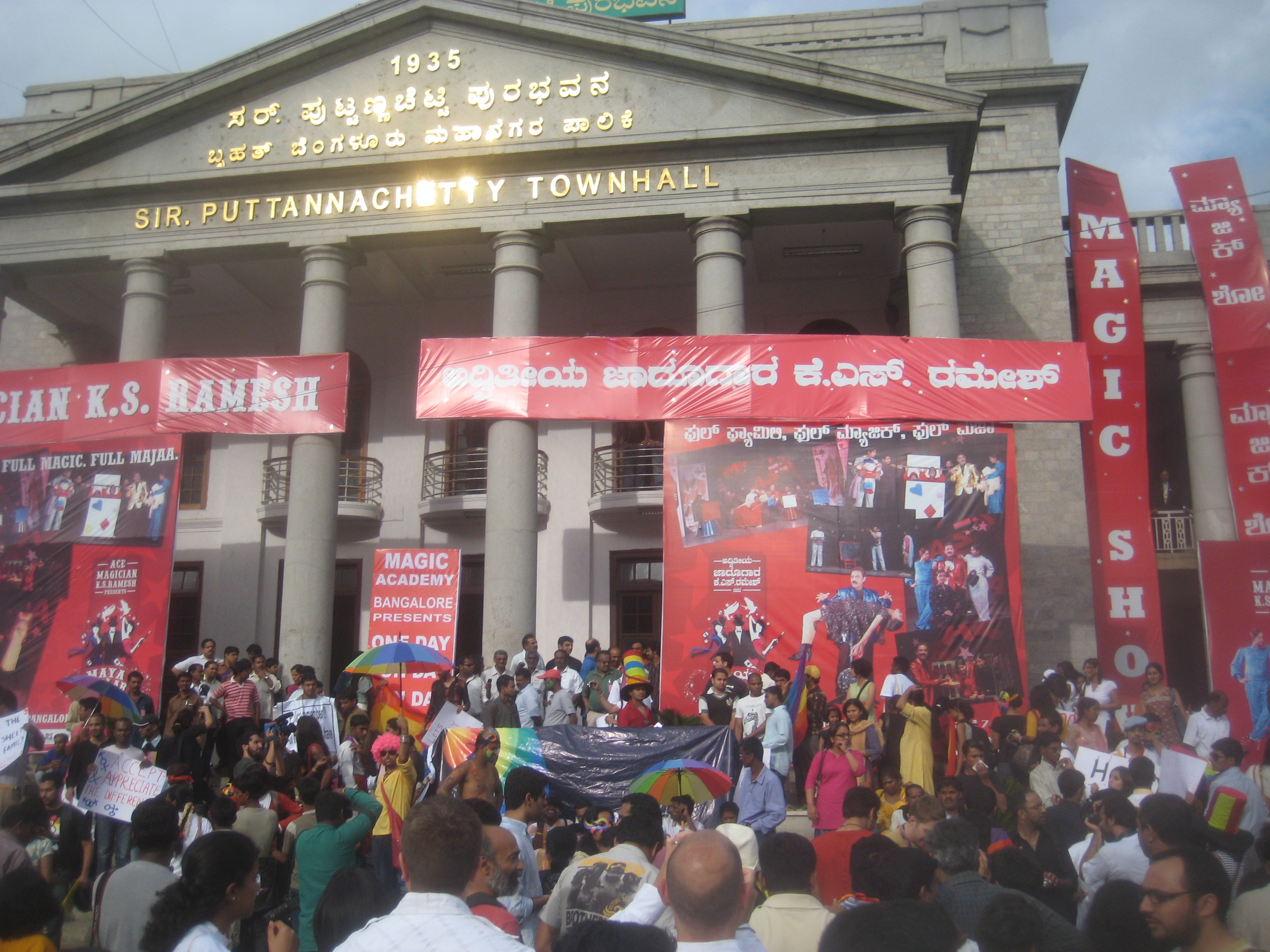
Bengaluru Namma Pride March at Sir Puttannachetty Town Hall

Bengaluru is widely regarded as relatively LGBTQ‑inclusive, hosting annual pride marches since 2008—such as the Namma Pride and Karnataka Queer Habba—and established queer social initiatives like the Bangalore Queer Film Festival and support organizations including Sangama and Good As You.

However, research and community reports indicate that LGBTQ individuals—especially outside of Bengaluru and other urban centers—continue to face social stigma, harassment, mental health challenges, and barriers to accessing welfare and inclusive services.

== Activism and community ==
- Sangama, founded in 1999, has led legal advocacy efforts—including petitions that spurred the 1% job reservation.
- Good As You Bangalore is among Southern India’s earliest community‑based LGBTQ support groups.
- Queer Campus Bangalore is a support group for lgbtq youth in Bangalore in school, colleges and universities.

== See also ==
- LGBT rights in India
- LGBTQ Rights in Kerala
- LGBTQ culture in Bengaluru
