= Recognition of same-sex unions in Karnataka =

Karnataka does not recognise same-sex marriages or civil unions. However, live-in relationships are not unlawful in Karnataka. The Indian Supreme Court has held that adults have a constitutional right to live together without being married, and that police cannot interfere with consenting adults living together. In 2025, a same-sex couple filed a writ petition with the Karnataka High Court, arguing that certain tax provisions resulted in unequal economic treatment for same-sex couples.

== Legal history ==
=== Background ===
Marriage in India is governed under several federal laws. These laws allow for the solemnisation of marriages according to different religions, notably Hinduism, Jainism, Buddhism, Christianity, Islam, Sikhism and Zoroastrianism. Every citizen has the right to choose which law will apply to them based on their community or religion. These laws are the Hindu Marriage Act, 1955, the Indian Christian Marriage Act, 1872, the Muslim Personal Law (Shariat) Application Act, 1937, the Anand Marriage Act, 1909, and the Parsi Marriage and Divorce Act, 1936. The Special Marriage Act, 1954 (SMA; Kannada: ವಿಶೇಷ ವಿವಾಹ ಕಾಯಿದೆ, ೧೯೫೪, Viśēṣa Vivāha Kāyide) (Note: Tulu: ವಿವಾಹ ನಿಯಮ, ೧೯೫೪, Vivāha Niyama) allows civil marriage officers to solemnize and register marriages for all Indian citizens regardless of the religion of either party. Although the vast majority of marriages in India continue to be solemnized and registered under the traditional religious personal laws, the SMA has become popular among interfaith couples, inter-caste couples, and spouses with no religious beliefs. None of these acts explicitly bans same-sex marriage.

On 14 February 2006, the Supreme Court of India ruled in Smt. Seema v. Ashwani Kumar that the states and union territories are obliged to register all marriages performed under the federal laws. The court's ruling was expected to reduce instances of child marriages, bigamy, cases of domestic violence and unlawful abandonment. Subsequently, the Government of Karnataka published the Karnataka Marriage (Registration and Miscellaneous Provisions) Rules, 2006 in the Karnataka Gazette on 18 April 2006. The measure provides for the registration of all marriages performed in Karnataka, and created local registrars that issue marriage licenses to prospective spouses. Registrars may refuse to issue licenses if the parties fail to meet the requirements to marry under the federal marriage laws. The marriage license form requires the names of the "bride" and the "bridegroom". The Karnataka Marriages (Registration and Miscellaneous Provisions) Act, 1976 does not explicitly ban same-sex marriages, and defines marriage simply as including remarriage.

Traditional Kannada marriages (ಮದುವೆ, maduve) are deeply rooted in custom and hold significant cultural importance. They involve elaborate pre-wedding preparations and culminate in key rituals, including the tying of the mangala sutra and the saptapadi. Arranged marriage remains the prevailing norm across India, accounting for the vast majority of unions, and often placing pressure on LGBT individuals to marry partners of the opposite sex. Nevertheless, some same-sex couples have participated in traditional marriage ceremonies, although the marriages lack legal status in Karnataka. Nived Antony Chullickal and Abdul Rahim, originally from Kerala, were married in Bangalore in December 2019. "I really just wanted to get married to my boyfriend and shared pre-wedding photoshoot, firstly, as a message to everyone that it is better to be late than never and second, it is so good to come out and marry your partner. Our wedding was like any other wedding. I also wanted it to be an inspiration for people, so that they too can do the same, and now so many people have called me and I really feel good that I have been an inspiration for all", Chullickal told The News Minute. In 2020, members of the Kodava community called for the "ostracisation" of Dr. Sharath Ponnappa, a Kodava, because he chose to wear traditional Kodava attire, the kupya-chele (Kodava: ಕುಪ್ಯ-ಚೇಲೆ), (Note: The kupya-chele consists of the kupya, a wraparound robe, and the chele, a gold-embroidered silk sash worn around the waist. The kupya-chele is worn by men on ceremonial occasions.) at his marriage to Sundeep Dosanj, a Punjabi American, in the United States on 26 September 2020. K.S. Devaiah, the president of the Kodava Samaja in Madikeri, a community group representing Kodava interests, noted that while there had been several instances of inter-caste marriages, this was the first same-sex marriage in the community. "This wedding, where the couple wore traditional Kodava attire, is an insult to the entire community. Hence, after a meeting the members of the Kodava Samaja, we have recommended ostracisation of Sharath Ponnappa from the community. [...] Gay marriage is one thing and wearing sacred Kodava attire to solemnise a gay marriage is another thing. We are against the latter", said Devaiah. Ponnappa, a California doctor, responded to the controversy, saying, "We knew there would be dissenters, but we have literally been fighting for acceptance since the day we were born, fighting to survive and be treated the same as our peers. However, we proudly choose to live our truth, celebrate our same-sex marriage and encourage the dissenters to open their minds and engage in positive dialogue to understand that all humans are created equally and deserve respect and love."

=== Live-in relationships ===
Recognition of same-sex unions in India

Live-in relationships (Kannada: ಒಟ್ಟಿಗೆ ವಾಸಿಸುವ ಸಂಬಂಧ, oṭṭige vāsisuva sambandha, pronounced [ˈɔʈːɪge ˈʋaːsɪsʊʋa ˈsɐmbɐn̪d̪ʱa], or ಲಿವ್-ಇನ್ ರಿಲೇಶನ್, liv-in rilēśan) are not illegal in Karnataka. The Indian Supreme Court has held that adults have a constitutional right to live together without being married, that police cannot interfere with consenting adults living together, and that live-in relationships are not unlawful. However, live-in relationships do not confer all the legal rights and benefits of marriage. The Karnataka High Court has ruled that the criminal offence of marital cruelty under Section 498A of the Indian Penal Code applies to live-in relationships, and has affirmed in accordance with the Supreme Court's ruling in D. Velusamy v. D. Patchaiammal that women in live-in relationships are protected from domestic violence under the Protection of Women from Domestic Violence Act, 2005. However, these state cases involved heterosexual couples. The Karnataka High Court has never ruled on a case involving same-sex live-in relationships, meaning that same-sex couples remain in a gray area. This signifies that their live-in relationships might not automatically enjoy protections that heterosexual "marriage-like" relationships receive.

In 2025, a same-sex couple, Anurag Kalia and Akhilesh Godi, filed a writ petition with the Karnataka High Court, arguing that certain tax provisions resulted in unequal economic treatment for same-sex couples. Godi had gifted Kalia a gold bracelet he had received from his father as part of the family heirloom. Under the Income Tax Act, if the aggregate value of money or assets received during a year exceeds ₹50,000, the amount is taxed as "income from other sources". Items received from a "relative" are excluded from this provision. However, because their relationship is not legally recognized as a marriage in India, Kalia did not qualify as a "relative". The petition argues that this treatment violates Article 14 and 15 of the Constitution of India, and that the statutory exemption for "relative[s]" should apply equally to same-sex partners. Solicitor General Tushar Mehta filed submissions in court in September 2026, arguing that reading same-sex couples into the Income Tax Act would make a "large number of statutory provisions in other laws unworkable". The High Court heard oral arguments on 9 October.

=== Transgender and intersex issues ===
Like most of South Asia, Karnataka recognizes a traditional third gender community known as hijra (ಹಿಜಡಾ, hijaḍā), historically holding respected community roles, and known for their distinct culture, communities led by gurus, and traditional roles as performers. In Karnataka, the community is also referred to as jōgappa (ಜೋಗಪ್ಪ, pronounced [ˈdʒoːgɐpːa]), though they differ from the hijra culture. They are biologically male, but transition to female roles after being "possessed" by the goddess Yellamma, serving as spiritual priests, healers and performers. The Supreme Court's 2023 ruling in Supriyo v. Union of India held that the Indian Constitution does not require the legalisation of same-sex marriages but affirmed that transgender people may marry opposite-sex partners. Some marriages of transgender people had already taken place prior to Supriyo. In January 2018, transgender activist Akkai Padmashali married her partner in Bangalore. A second marriage took place in the same city in May 2018. The couple, originally from Krishnagiri in Tamil Nadu, said, "We are glad that our marriage was registered and it is a special feeling and will cherish this our entire life." One of the partners added, "My family opposed our union and threatened me with dire consequences. They harassed me mentally and tried to blackmail me emotionally. But we had made up our mind and a few of our friends also supported us. We got married at a temple, but could not register it in Tamil Nadu due to some formalities which could not be fulfilled for various reasons. We took the help of Akkai and got the marriage registered. Without Akkai, we don't know how this could have happened." The marriage could be registered under the Hindu Marriage Act as both partners were of the opposite legal sex.

== Historical and customary recognition ==
The Halakki Vokkaliga, an indigenous tribe living in the Uttara Kannada district, have been celebrating traditional lesbian marriages for "so long that none living in the community now knows when and how it began". One such wedding, known in Kannada as daḍḍuve maduve (ದಡ್ಡುವೆ ಮದುವೆ), is performed every year to honour Indra and pray that "the rain shouldn't be more or less than required". After the procession and rituals, the newly-weds, both of whom are dressed in saris, are blessed and given gifts just as at any other wedding. A recent daḍḍuve maduve in 2022 took place in a Hindu temple honouring Ganesha, who holds importance for the Halakki Vokkaliga.

== See also ==
- LGBTQ rights in Karnataka
- LGBTQ rights in India
- Recognition of same-sex unions in India
- Supriyo v. Union of India
