= CSST =

CSST may refer to:

- Carmelite Sisters of Saint Teresa, founded by Teresa of St. Rose of Lima in 1887
- Colorado Springs School of Technology, a high school in Colorado Springs, Colorado, United States
- Commission de la santé et de la sécurité du travail; see Boulevard du Souvenir overpass collapse
- Corrugated stainless steel tubing
- Xuntian (Chinese Survey Space Telescope), a planned Chinese space telescope

== See also ==
- CST (disambiguation)
- CSTS
