= Soma Sengupta =

Scientist and neuro-oncologist

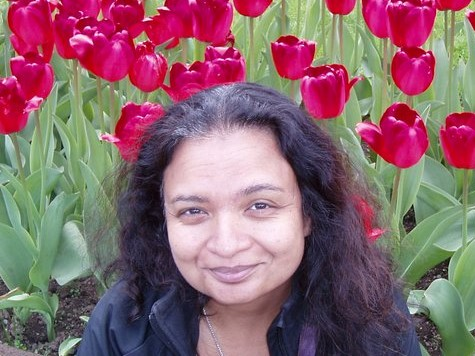
Soma sengupta

Soma Sengupta is a British-American physician-scientist. She is a United Council for Neurologic Subspecialties (USNC) certified neuro-oncologist, Neurologist and fellowship-trained in Integrative Medicine (University of Arizona) and Executive Leadership in Healthcare (Drexel University). Her clinical interests span treatment of brain tumor patients, integrative approaches in neurology and oncology, as well as healthcare policy. She is a Tufts University School of Medicine Clinical Professor in the Departments of Neurology and Neurosurgery as well as Department Chair, Neurology, and Neurologist-in-Chief, Tufts Medical Center. She is also a Bye Fellow at Lucy Cavendish College, University of Cambridge, U.K., and Honorary Fellow in the College of Medicine & Veterinary Medicine, The University of Edinburgh, U.K.

== Research and career ==
Sengupta completed a PhD in Biochemistry (1994) and a MBBChir (2002), both at the University of Cambridge, U.K. She has a long-standing research interest in clinically important membrane transport proteins. After her Ph.D. she worked in Professor Carolyn Slayman's laboratory at Yale University on membrane transport protein biology critical to cardiac function. She was a Visiting Fellow at various institutions (2000-2007), which included immunology research on the TAP transporter at the Cambridge Institute of Medical Research with Wellcome Trust Principal Research Fellow Professor Paul Lehner, fungal membrane transport protein research with Professor Rajini Rao at Johns Hopkins, and pediatric brain tumor research with Professor Scott Pomeroy at Boston Children's Hospital, Boston.

She completed a Neurology Residency at Beth Israel Deaconess Medical Center-Harvard (2011), a Clinical Fellowship in Neuro-Oncology (2013) at Boston Children's Hospital/Dana-Farber Cancer Institute/Mass General, an Integrative Medicine Fellowship (2023) at the Andrew Weil Center for Integrative Medicine, The University of Arizona, and a Executive Leadership in Health Care Fellowship at Drexel University College of Medicine, Philadelphia, PA.

Her first faculty appointment was as an Instructor in the Department of Neurology at Beth Israel Deaconess Medical Center, Boston. She discovered that medulloblastoma tumor cell viability could be impaired by activating cancer intrinsic GABA-A receptors with a new class of benzodiazepine analogs. She then took an appointment in the Department of Neurology at Emory University, where in collaboration with biochemist Daniel Pomeranz Krummel (Tufts Medical Center) and medicinal chemist James Cook (University of Wisconsin-Milwaukee), reported on the control of melanoma tumors in mice using benzodiazepine analogs by both a direct mechanism and by enhancing infiltration of immune cells into the tumor microenvironment.

She continued this line of research as the holder of the Harold C. Schott Endowed Chair of Molecular Therapeutics at the University of Cincinnati College of Medicine.

Currently, a major focus of her lab research explores how activating membrane transport proteins regulate cancer cell bioelectricity and how they can be leveraged to induce apoptosis in disparate cancer cells, including primary and metastatic brain cancers. She co-founded a corporation with Pomeranz Krummel and Cook to advance this strategy. Her clinical research includes employing novel therapeutic apps to remediate neurological deficits in cancer patients caused by treatments. She also is a clinical trialist centered in the neuro-oncology space.

She has authored/greater than 100 publications, a book on brain tumor patients that is aimed for patients and clinical trainees, two volumes of poetry, and two children's books. She has featured on several news articles and TV interviews to discuss her research.

== Awards and honors ==
In 2021 Sengupta became a Fellow of the Royal College of Physicians. She is also a Fellow of the AAN and ANA. She has received many NIH training grants for her research including the R25, K12 and K08 as well as foundational support from the American Cancer Society, B*CURED, and the American Brain Tumor Association. She has also been recognized for her clinical commitments, including receipt of the Leonard Tow Humanism in Medicine Award presented by The Arnold P. Gold Foundation (2023). While training in the UK, she received funding from the Wellcome Trust and Medical Research Council.

== Selected research Articles ==
- Pugh, Trevor J.; Weeraratne, Shyamal Dilhan; Archer, Tenley C.; Pomeranz Krummel, Daniel A.; Auclair, Daniel; Bochicchio, James; Carneiro, Mauricio O.; Carter, Scott L.; Cibulskis, Kristian; Erlich, Rachel L.; Greulich, Heidi (2012-08-02). "Medulloblastoma exome sequencing uncovers subtype-specific somatic mutations". Nature. 488 (7409): 106–110. Bibcode:2012Natur.488..106P. doi:10.1038/nature11329. ISSN 1476-4687. PMC 3413789. PMID 22820256.
- Hewitt, E. W. (2001-02-01). "The human cytomegalovirus gene product US6 inhibits ATP binding by TAP". The EMBO Journal. 20 (3): 387–396. doi:10.1093/emboj/20.3.387. ISSN 1460-2075. PMC 133477. PMID 11157746.
- Weeraratne, Shyamal Dilhan; Amani, Vladimir; Teider, Natalia; Pierre-Francois, Jessica; Winter, Dominic; Kye, Min Jeong; Sengupta, Soma; Archer, Tenley; Remke, Marc; Bai, Alfa H. C.; Warren, Peter (April 2012). "Pleiotropic effects of miR-183~96~182 converge to regulate cell survival, proliferation and migration in medulloblastoma". Acta Neuropathologica. 123 (4): 539–552. doi:10.1007/s00401-012-0969-5. ISSN 1432-0533. PMC 6172007. PMID 22402744.
- Mechanisms and clinical impact of antifungal drug resistance.
