= Shubha Chacko =

Indian feminist and human rights activist

Shubha Chacko (born 26 August 1965) is an Indian feminist and gender-rights activist. She is the founder of Solidarity Foundation, a Bangalore-based not-for-profit organisation. She is also one of the founding board members of Sangama, a gender and sexual minority rights NGO in Bangalore along with Manohar Elavarthi. In April 2025, she relinquished her role as the director and handed over charge to a new director Bhavani. However, she remains on the board of the foundation.

== Early life and education ==
Shubha Chacko has her roots in Kerala but is born and resides in Bangalore. She did her schooling at St. Francis Xavier's Girls High School, Frazer Town, Bangalore. Later, she studied at Mount Carmel College, Bangalore, and did her master's degree in Social Work at Tata Institute of Social Sciences, Mumbai.

== Career ==
Chacko is one of the few feminist activists who is active fighting for the rights of gender and sexual minorities, and sex workers in India. She headed many NGOs, including Sangama, Aneka and Solidarity Foundation and supported in nurturing and developing sexual minority and sex worker community based organisations and collectives for over 25 years. From 2013, she is the executive director of Solidarity Foundation. She is a researcher interested in macro economics, NGO management, social justice issues including gender and sexual minorities and has published articles in peer-reviewed journals. She has been an invited speaker at many international conferences and published many reports. She has been instrumental in bringing jogappas into the mainstream and has supported a musical event with renowned T. M. Krishna. To support LGBTQIA+ community, she came up with the idea of Pride Cafe and Solidarity Foundation partnered with Amadeus and launched the cafe in Bangalore.

=== Honours ===
On 25 April 2024, she was appointed to the board of Global Fund Community Foundation.

== Awards ==
She received the Times Ascent Award as global diversity leader at the World HRD Congress, Mumbai 2017.
