= Rajyotsava Awards (2020) =

Awards given by the government of Karnataka, India

2020 Rajyotsava Awards
- Date: 1 November 2020
- Location: Ravindra Kalakshetra, Bengaluru
- Country: India
- Presented by: Government of Karnataka

The 2020 Rajyotsava Awards ceremony took place at the Ravindra Kalakshetra on 1 November 2020. Awarded annually by the Government of Karnataka, the ceremony saw 65 individuals being awarded for achievements in various fields.

== List of awardees ==
Name of the recipient	District/Location	Field/Category
Prof. C. P. Siddhashrama	Dharwad	Literature
V. Muni Venkatappa	Kolar	Literature
Ramanna Byati	Gadag	Literature
Valerian D'Souza	Dakshina Kannada	Literature
D. N. Akki	Yadgir	Literature
Hambaiah Nuli	Raichur	Music
Ananth Terdal	Belagavi	Music
B. V. Srinivas	Bengaluru City	Music
Girija Narayan	Bengaluru City	Music
K. Lingappa Sherigar	Dakshina Kannada	Music
K. N. Bhat	Bengaluru City	Law and Judiciary
M. L. Vijayakumar	Udupi	Law and Judiciary
C. Maheshwaran	Mysuru	Media
T. Venkatesh	Bengaluru City	Media
Dr. A. S. Chandrashekar	Mysuru	Yoga
M. N. Shadakshari	Chikkamagaluru	Education
Dr. R. Ramakrishna	Chamarajanagar	Education
Dr. M. G. Eshwarappa	Davangere	Education
Dr. Puttasiddaiah	Mysuru	Education
Ashok Shettar	Belagavi	Education
D. S. Dandin	Gadag	Education
Kusumodara Deranna Shetty	Dakshina Kannada	Horanadu Kannadiga
Vidya Simhacharya Mahuli	Mulund, Maharashtra	Horanadu Kannadiga
H. B. Nanjegowda	Tumakuru	Sports
Usha Rani	Bengaluru City	Sports
Dr. Ashok Sonnad	Bagalkot	Medicine
Dr. B. S. Srinath	Shivamogga	Medicine
Dr. A. Nagarathna	Ballari	Medicine
Dr. Venkatappa	Ramanagara	Medicine
N. S. Hegde	Uttara Kannada	Social Service
Prema Kodandarama Shreshti	Chikkamagaluru	Social Service
Manigar Meeran Saheb	Udupi	Social Service
Mohini Siddegowda	Chikkamagaluru	Social Service
Surat Singh Kanur Singh Rajput	Bidar	Agriculture
S. V. Sumangalamma Veerabhadrappa	Chitradurga	Agriculture
Dr. Siddramappa Basavantharao Patil	Kalaburagi	Agriculture
Amar Narayan	Chikkaballapur	Environment
N. D. Patil	Vijayapura	Environment
Prof. Udupi Srinivas	Udupi	Science and Technology
Dr. Chindi Vasudevappa	Shivamogga	Science and Technology
Dr. C. N. Manchegowda	Bengaluru City	Cooperation
Kempavva Harijana	Belagavi	Bayalata
Chennabasappa Bendigeri	Haveri	Bayalata
Bangar Achari	Chamarajanagar	Yakshagana
M. K. Ramesh Acharya	Shivamogga	Yakshagana
Anasuyamma	Hassan	Theatre
H. Shadaksharappa	Davangere	Theatre
Thippeswamy	Chitradurga	Theatre
B. S. Basavaraj	Tumakuru	Cinema
Apadhanda Thimmaiah Raghu	Kodagu	Cinema
M. J. Vached Mutt	Dharwad	Art
Gururaj Hosakote	Bagalkot	Folklore
Dr. Hampanahalli Thimmegowda	Hassan	Folklore
N. S. Janardhana Murthy	Mysuru	Sculpture
Jyothi Pattabhiram	Bengaluru City	Dance
Keshappa Shillekyatara	Koppal	Folklore (Togalu Gombeyata)
Dr. K. V. Raju	Kolar	Miscellaneous
N. Venkobha Rao	Hassan	Miscellaneous
Dr. K. S. Rajanna	Mandya	Miscellaneous
V. Lakshminarayan	Mandya	Miscellaneous
Youth For Seva	Bengaluru City	Organization (Service)
Devadasi Swavalambana Kendra	Ballari	Organization (Social Reform)
Better India	Bengaluru City	Organization (Media/Service)
Yuva Brigade	Bengaluru Rural	Organization (Youth/Service)
Dharmothana Trust	Dakshina Kannada	Organization (Heritage/Conservation)
