= Rajyotsava Awards (2021) =

Awards given by the government of Karnataka, India

2021 Rajyotsava Awards
- Date: 1 November 2021
- Location: Ravindra Kalakshetra, Bengaluru
- Country: India
- Presented by: Government of Karnataka

The 2021 Rajyotsava Awards ceremony took place at the Ravindra Kalakshetra on 1 November 2021. Awarded annually by the Government of Karnataka, the ceremony saw 66 individuals being awarded for achievements in various fields.

== List of awardees ==
Name of the Recipient	District / Location	Category
Mahadeva Shankanapura	Chamarajanagar	Literature
Prof D T Rangaswamy	Chitradurga	Literature
Jayalakshmi Mangalamurthy	Raichur	Literature
Ajjampura Manjunath	Chikkamagaluru	Literature
Krishna Kulkarni	Vijayapura	Literature
Siddappa Bidari	Bagalkot	Literature
Fakirappa Ramappa Kodai	Haveri	Theatre
Prakash Belawadi	Chikkamagaluru	Theatre
Ramesh Gowda Patil	Ballari	Theatre
Malleshaiah N	Ramanagara	Theatre
Savitri Gowdar	Gadag	Theatre
R B Nayak	Vijayapura	Folklore
Gauramma Huchappa Mastar	Shivamogga	Folklore
Durgappa Chennadasara	Ballari	Folklore
Bananje Babu Amin	Udupi	Folklore
Mallikarjuna Rachappa Mudakavi	Bagalkot	Folklore
Venkappa Govindappa Bhajantri	Dharwad	Folklore
Maharudrappa Veerappa Itagi	Haveri	Folklore
Thyagaraju C	Kolar	Music
Harold Cyril D'Souza	Dakshina Kannada	Music
Dr G Jnananda	Chikkaballapur	Sculpture
Venkanna Chitragara	Koppal	Sculpture
Solagatti Yamunavva (Salamantapi)	Bagalkot	Social Service
Madalai Madaiah	Mysuru	Social Service
Muniyappa Domluru	Bengaluru City	Social Service
B L Patil Athani	Belagavi	Social Service
Dr J N Ramakrishnagowda	Mandya	Social Service
Dr Sulthan B Jagalur	Davanagere	Medicine
Dr Vyasa Deshpande	Dharwad	Medicine
Dr A R Pradeep	Bengaluru City	Medicine
Dr Suresh Rao	Dakshina Kannada	Medicine
Dr Shivanagowda Rudragowda Ramanagouder	Dharwad	Medicine
Dr Sudarshan	Bengaluru City	Medicine
Rohan Bopanna	Kodagu	Sports
K Gopinath	Bengaluru City	Sports
Rohith Kumar Kateel	Udupi	Sports
A Nagaraj	Bengaluru City	Sports
Devaraj	Bengaluru City	Cinema
Swami Lingappa	Mysuru	Education
Shridhar Chakravarthi	Dharwad	Education
Prof P V Krishna Bhat	Shivamogga	Education
Dr HS Savitri	Bengaluru City	Science and Technology
J U Kulkarni	Bengaluru City	Science and Technology
Dr C Nagaraj	Bengaluru Rural	Agriculture
Gurulingappa Meldoddi	Bidar	Agriculture
Shankarappa Ammanaghatta	Tumakuru	Agriculture
Mahadeva Velipa	Uttara Kannada	Environment
Bykampady Ramachandra	Dakshina Kannada	Environment
Patnam Anantha Padmanabha	Mysuru	Journalism
U B Rajalakshmi	Udupi	Journalism
Dr Sunitha	Mumbai	Horanadu Kannadiga
Chandrashekar Palthadi	Mumbai	Horanadu Kannadiga
Dr Siddameshwar Kantikar	(Non-Resident)	Horanadu Kannadiga
Praveen Shetty	Dubai	Horanadu Kannadiga
Ba Ma Shrikanta	Shivamogga	Yoga
Dr Raghavendra Shenoy	Bengaluru City	Yoga
Dr B Ambanna	Vijayanagar	Miscellaneous
Captain Rajarao	Ballari	Miscellaneous
Gangavathi Pranesh	Koppal	Miscellaneous
C V Keshava Murthy	Mysuru	Judiciary
H R Kasturi Rangan	Hassan	Administration
Naveen Nagappa	Haveri	Army/Defence
Gopalacharya	Shivamogga	Yakshagana
Ratnamma Shivappa Babalada	Yadagiri	Civic Work (Pourakarmika)
Mahadevalla Kadechooru	Kalaburagi	Hyderabad-Karnataka Unification
Shyamaraju	Bengaluru City	Entrepreneurship
