= Mount Carmel University =

Private university in Bengaluru, India

- Other names: Mount Carmel Deemed University; Mount Carmel Deemed-to-be University; Mount Carmel (Deemed-to-be University);
- Former names: Mount Carmel College (MCC) ; Mount Carmel College, Autonomous
- Motto: Ad Jesum Per Mariam
- Motto in English: To Jesus through Mary
- Type: Private, Deemed University
- Established: 1944 at Trichur, Kerala (82 years ago); 1948 relocated to Bangalore, Karnataka (78 years ago)
- Founders: Carmelite Sisters of Saint Teresa, Ernakulam, Kerala
- Accreditation: NAAC, NIRF, NBA
- Affiliations: UGC
- Religious affiliation: Catholic
- Vice-Chancellor: Dr. George Lekha
- Location: Bangalore, Karnataka, India; 12°59′35.5″N 77°35′17.4″E
- Campus: 58, Palace Road, Bangalore
- Website: mountcarmeluniversity.edu.in

Mount Carmel University (MCU), officially Mount Carmel (Deemed to be University) is a private deemed university in Bengaluru, Karnataka, India. It was established by Carmelite Sisters of Saint Teresa, Kerala to empower women through education and remained a women's college for over 75 years. In 2021, it admitted male students to postgraduate courses, became fully co-educational in 2024, and was granted deemed university status in 2026.

== History ==
The college was founded on 24 April 1887 by Mother Teresa of St Rose of Lima in Ernakulum in Kerala. It is owned and administered by the Carmelite Sisters of Saint Teresa. As a minority institution, it enjoys the rights and privileges guaranteed by the Indian Constitution.

After over seven decades, the college which was only for girls, opened its post graduate courses to boys in 2016 and started enrollment in 2021. The college completed 75 years during the academic year 2022-2023 and following a decision taken at the Bangalore University Academic Council meeting, the college declared on 4 January 2024, that all courses are open for both boys and girls. Dr.Prof. George Lekha is the principal of the college The decision is line with the college's aspirations to achieve a deemed to be university status.

On 19 June 2026, the institution was accorded Deemed-to-be University status by the Ministry of Education under the University Grants Commission (UGC).

The college was affiliated with Bangalore University until 2022, after which it became affiliated with Bengaluru City University. Following its recognition as a deemed-to-be university in 2026, it came under the purview of the University Grants Commission (UGC).

== Academics and accreditation ==
The college offers undergraduate, postgraduate and doctoral programmes in arts, science and commerce. The college is Rollege with Potential for Excellence by UGC, Star College Status by DBT, Scientific and Industrial Research Organization (SIRO) by the Department of Scientific and Industrial Research (DSIR), Government of India. The college has a sister institution Mount Carmel Institute Of Management which offers a post-graduation diploma in Business Management for women. The Centre for Education Growth and Research has declared MCC as the Best Women’s College in Karnataka for its ‘outstanding and exemplary contribution towards education, skill development and research’.

In 2025, it was ranked by India Today as one of the top three colleges in Karnataka in the fields of arts, science and commerce.

The institution has been accredited with 'A+' grade by the NAAC.

University rankings

General – India
- NIRF (Colleges) (2024): 151-200

== Student festivals ==
Cul Ah is the cultural fest of the college that includes events such as dance, drama, music and academically driven contests like quizzes. Cross Currents is a national level Commerce Fest and Carpediem is a national level management fest, along with Manan which is a national level Humanities fest. These are to name a few of the fests hosted by the college.

== Notable alumni ==
- A. J. S. Lakshmi Shree, visual artist
- Anjali Jay, British-Indian actress and classical dancer
- Amulya, actress
- Anu Prabhakar, actress
- Anushka Sharma, actress
- Anushka Shetty, actress
- Aparna Popat, badminton player
- Deepika Padukone, actress
- Disha Annappa Ravi, environmental activist
- Evangeline Anderson Rajkumar, theologian
- Faye D'Souza, journalist
- Joanne Da Cunha, Pond's Femina Goa 2013 / Actress, Model, Singer
- Kiran Mazumdar-Shaw, businesswoman, technocrat, innovator, and the founder of Biocon
- Mamta Mohandas, actress and playback singer
- Margaret Alva, governor of Rajasthan and former governor of Uttarakhand
- MILI (Mili Nair), singer-songwriter, composer, producer
- Monisha Unni, actress
- Nicole Faria, model and Miss Earth 2010
- Nithya Menen, actress
- Nirupama Rao, Indian ambassador to the United States
- Pooja Umashankar, actress
- Priya Pereira, actress
- Radhika Pandit, actress
- Rajini Rao, Indian-American physiologist and professor at Johns Hopkins University School of Medicine, principal investigator of the Rao Lab
- Roshmitha Harimurthy, Miss Diva-Miss Universe India (2016)
- Sharmiela Mandre, actress
- Teresa A Braggs, filmmaker
- Shreya Sharma, analyst
- Vaishali Desai, model and actress, winner of Indian title of Miss International
- Vasundahara Das, singer, actress
- Suparna Rajaram, distinguished Professor of Psychology at Stony Brook University
- Shubha Chako, feminist, gender and sexual minority rights activist and founder of Solidarity Foundation.

== See also ==
- List of institutions of higher education in Bangalore
