= Sukri Bommagowda =

Indian folk singer (1937–2025)

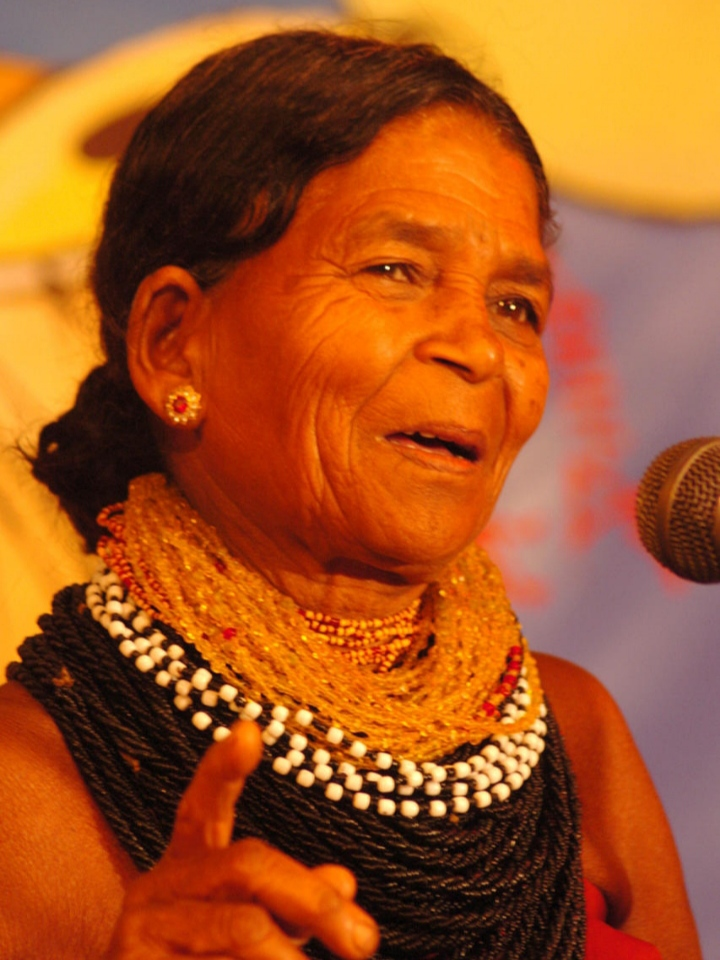
- Born: 1937; Badigeri, Bombay Presidency, British India
- Died: 13 February 2025 (aged 88); Manipal, Karnataka, India
- Occupation: Singer
- Known for: Halakki Vokkaliga
- Children: 3
- Awards: Padma Shri

Sukri Bommagowda (1937 – 13 February 2025) was an Indian folk singer belonging to the Halakki Vokkaliga tribe in Ankola, Karnataka, India. She received several awards, including the Padma Shri, one of India's highest civilian honours, for her contributions to the arts, and her work in preserving traditional tribal music.

== Background ==
Bommagowda was born into the Halakki Vokkaliga tribe, in Badigeri, in Uttara Kannada, and was married at the age of 16. She and her husband had two children, and adopted another child.

Bommagowda died on 13 February 2025 at a hospital in Manipal, Karnataka, where she had been undergoing treatment. She was 88.

== Career ==
Bommagowda was taught to sing as a child by her mother and worked to preserve the traditional music and songs of the Halakki Vokkaliga tribe. Following the death of her husband, she began performing traditional music of the Halakki Vokkaliga tribe in Karnataka. She taught traditional music and songs to members of her tribe. She has been described as the "nightingale of Halakki". Bommagowda was publicly recognised for her work in preserving a large corpus of tribal songs as part of an oral tradition. All India Radio, India's national broadcast radio, and the Karnataka Janapada Academy worked with Bommagowda to record, translate, and preserve these songs.

In 1988 her work was recognised by the Karnataka State government, and she was later the recipient of multiple state awards and honours for her contributions to arts and music, including the Nadoja Award, and the Janapada Shri Award. In 2017, her work gained national recognition when she was awarded the Padma Shri, one of India's highest civilian honours, for her contributions to music.

In addition to her work in music, Bommagowda became a member of the gram panchayat, a local government body, in Badigeri, Karnataka. Although illiterate herself, she campaigned for literacy, especially among girls, and also campaigned for a ban against alcohol in her area, following the death of her adopted son from alcohol poisoning.

== Awards ==
Year	Award	Reference
1988	Award from the Karnataka government (for "preserving the culture of indigenous tribes")	
1999	Janapada Shri Award (for contributions to the field of arts, granted by the Karnataka Government)	
2006	Nadoja Award (granted by the Kannada University)	
2009	Sandesha Arts Award, The Alva Nudisiri Award	
2017	Padma Shri Award	

== In popular culture ==
Bommagowda is featured in a Karnataka middle school textbook, in relation to her contributions to music.
