= A. J. S. Lakshmi Shree =

Bangalore-based Indian visual artist

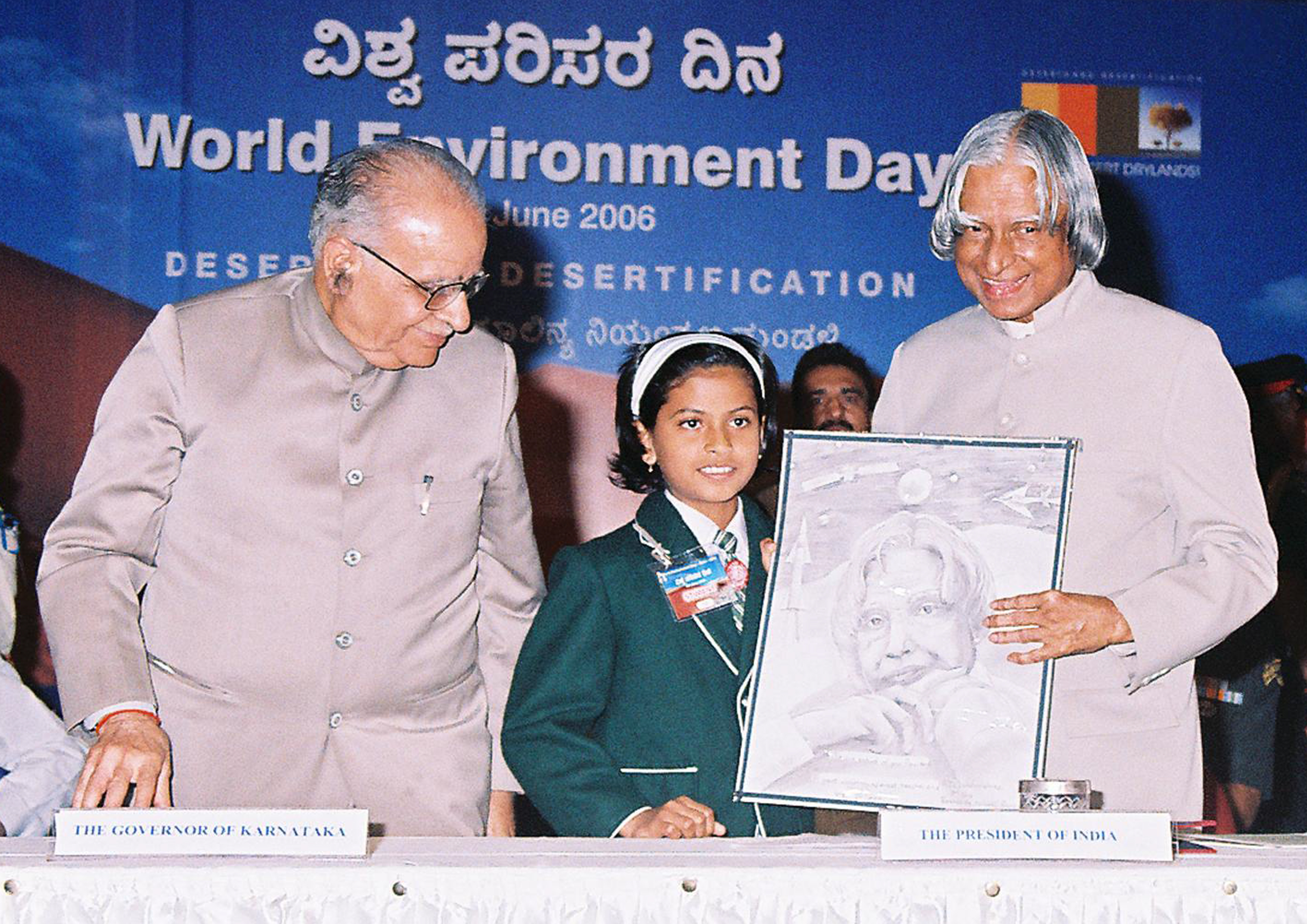
- Shree in 2006 (center)
- Born: 19 August 1996 (age 30)
- Education: Bethesda School, Mount Carmel College, Bangalore, University Visvesvaraya College of Engineering
- Awards: National Bal Shree Award

A. J. S. Lakshmi Shree is a Bangalore-based Indian visual artist. A child prodigy, Lakshmi started painting at the age of two. At age five, approximately 100 of her paintings were displayed at 2001 Bangalore Festival of Art. Lakshmi was congratulated by then Prime Minister of India Dr Manmohan Singh in 2007.

== Early life ==
Lakshmi, born to Mr Jayaprakash A.G.K and Mrs A. Suma Prakash, received early recognition. With support from her parents, she exhibited her work at the Kannada Bhavan, the Venkatappa Art Gallery, Ravindra Kalakshetra and the Gandhi Bhavan at a very early age. She has received over 340 medals, trophies and citations at local, regional, national and international level.

== Awards and recognition ==
- National level “ Balashree" award by National Bal Bhavan, Delhi 2012, Vigyan Bhavan, New Delhi. 29 January 2015. Given by HRD Minister Smt.Smriti Zubin Irani
- Winner for Paint For the Planet Competition at age of 12. Her painting was exhibited at an exhibition at UN Headquarters
- ART Center for Children and young people, HYVINKAA, FINLAND – selected for international art exhibition, Diploma award – 2014
- Third prize in an international children's painting competition supported by the UNEP at age of 8
- Regional Winner at Be The Inspiration Painting Contest
- Young Achievers Award by Infosys in Arts
- Third prize at DH PV Painting Contest
- FAI Switzerland young artist winner in 2005
- Winner at Dino Art Contest by Sam Noble Oklahoma Museum of Natural History
- First Runner up at Westminster's International Design Challenge 2015–2016 for 'A collective challenge to transform 100 public spaces'
- Director of Goleniow Culture House prize at international painting competition organised by UNESCO and Goleniowski Dom Kultury, Poland
