= JC Road =

Street in Bangalore, India

Jayachamarajendra Road, or simply J.C. Road, is a street in the heart of Bangalore, the state capital of Karnataka, India, named after Maharaja Jayachamaraja Wadiyar. It is located in Kalasipalya and connects with Kasturba Road to the north. The road houses many important landmarks of the city such as the BBMP Head Office, Bangalore Town Hall, and Ravindra Kalakshetra; and is near the Lal Bagh Botanical Gardens. Sri Bhagawan Mahaveer Jain College lies along the road.

== Features ==
| Point | Coordinates (links to map & photo sources) |
|---|---|
| Bangalore Town Hall (north end of J C Road) | 12.963721°N 77.585288°E |
| Ravindra Kalakshetra | 12.962372°N 77.584637°E |
| midpoint of J C Road | 12.959454°N 77.583029°E |
| BBMP Head Office | 12.956846°N 77.581480°E |
| south end of J C Road | 12.955215°N 77.580073°E |
