= LGBTQ culture in Bengaluru =

Bangalore is a multicultural city and has experienced a dramatic social and cultural change with the advent of the liberalization and expansion of the information technology and business process outsourcing industries in India. With much expatriate population in the city, Bangalore is slightly more relaxed.

In June 2011, human-resources representatives from 11 multinational companies met at IBM's Bengaluru campus to share practices for LGBT inclusion in their organisations. Forbes India described the collaboration as a first-of-its-kind effort in India's corporate sector.

== Organizations ==
Several organizations voice the concerns of LGBTIQ community and provide forum to openly share topics of interest.

=== GoodAsYou ===
GoodasYou is a social, intellectual and cultural group that promotes equality, acceptance and self-confidence among LGBT individuals of Bangalore. Many activities of this informal support group are described in the following sections.

==== Weekly meetings ====
These meetings serve many LGBTIQ individuals to discuss emotional, social, health and other issues concerning the queer people of Bangalore/India. Many individual have come to terms with their sexuality and/or Gender Identity by participating at these meetings.

=== Swabhava ===
Swabhava is an NGO working for LGBT rights and providing counseling support to queer individuals.

=== Jeeva ===
Jeeva in an NGO setup by Umesh, an LGBTQ rights activist in Bangalore. Jeeva (which means life in Kannada), registered on 5 November 2012 works for sexual minorities with special focus on working class sexual minorities. Their activities and work are in many areas ranging from issues of mental health, livelihood, community media through Kannada magazine called Ananya and radio program called Jeeva dairy on radio-active community radio, co-organizing Bangalore's LGBT pride called Namma Pride/Queer Habba, organizing on-the-road-protests and fighting for legal rights in courts on behalf of many underprivileged trans and other queer members of community.

=== Amour Queer Dating ===
Amour, a platform for LGBTQ people to find long term companions all over India, launched in Bengaluru in June 2016.

=== WHAQ! ===
WHAQ! (We're Here and Queer!) is a support space for women loving women (les/bi/trans/queer/questioning) to voice concerns, ideas, and issues together.

=== Maya for Women ===
Maya for Women is a feminist collective trust dedicated to building community through supporting the empowerment, interests, visibility, and choices of women living in the Global South. They provide support, counseling and assistance to all women in Bangalore, regardless of their sexuality. WHaQ! is one of 4 support spaces for LBT women that is run through Maya for Women.

=== Sangama and Samara ===
Sangama (an NGO) and Samara (CBO) works for marginalized sections of LGBT population of Bangalore and other towns of Karnataka.

=== Queer Campus Bangalore ===
Queer Campus Bangalore is a support group and safe space for youth of non-conforming sexual orientations and gender identities in Bangalore. It caters to the school, college, and university going crowd of the city.

== Activities ==
=== GRAB (Gay Runners and Breakfast) ===
Many Queer individuals jog and run every weekend at the local park. Following the early morning run, they gather for breakfast at a nearby restaurant, chit-chat, socialize and discuss.

=== WHAQ weekly meetings ===
WHaQ (We are Here and Queer) holds support group meetings for queer women every other Sunday in addition to weekly social meetings on Wednesdays.

=== Women's outdoor activities ===
Maya Outdoor group has Queer women interested in fitness meet every Sunday and participate in a large variety of team sports, such as cricket and football. There are also women who run or walk together, or practice yoga.

=== outandabout ===
India's first queer inclusive travel community based out of Bangalore.

== Events ==
=== Bangalore Queer Film Festival ===
Bangalore Queer Film Festival happens every year in February. It is a three-day fest, where in a variety of LGBT themed movies from across the world and across many languages in India, would be played. A close to 1000 people are typically expected there.

=== Pink Divas ===
Pink Divas is a dance group that does the closing day dance performance every year at Bangalore Queer Film Fest.

=== Bengaluru Namma Pride March ===
Bengaluru Namma Pride March, the queer pride march of Bengaluru, happens every winter along with Delhi and other pride marches of India. Close to 1000 people, both LGBT members and supporters walk with colorful banners in the Bangalore streets, ending with a meeting and celebration, typically at city town hall.

== Bangalore's LGBT history ==
- 1994: GoodasYou support group started.
- 1999: Sangama NGO for sexual minorities established.
- 2008: [Feb] First Queer Film Festival held
- 2008: [Jun] First Queer Pride March held
- 2009: WHaQ! (We're Here and Queer) was founded.
- 2011: Queer Campus Bangalore was started in October.
- 2013: The first lesbian Dykes on Bikes procession takes place as a part of Bangalore Pride 2013, and is believed to be the first in India as well.
- 2014: Maya for Women was established.
- 2016: Amour (Queer Dating), a platform for Queer people to find long term companions, launched.

== See also ==
- LGBTQ rights in Karnataka
