= Kasturba Road =

Street in Bangalore, Karnataka, India

Coordinates: 12.971907°N 77.593679°E

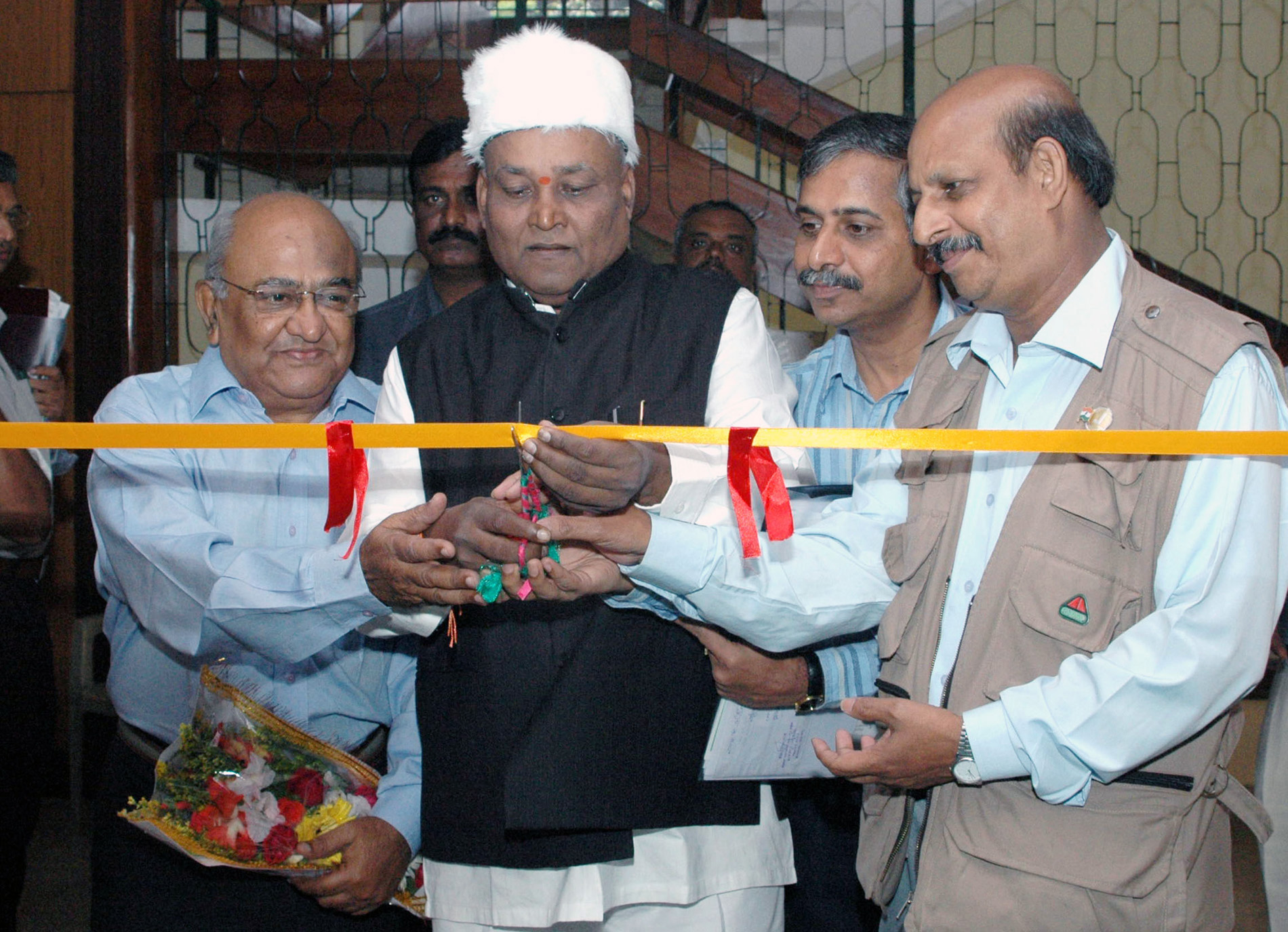
The Minister for Excise, BWSSB and Information, Govt. of Karnataka, Shri Katta Subramanya Naidu inaugurating the Photo exhibition of the award-winning and selected photographs of 'Spirit of Independent India' from 20th National Photo Contest, at Venkatappa Art Gallery, Kasturba Road, Bangalore on 7 August 2008. The Noted Photographer from Karnataka, Shri T.S Nagarajan and the Director, Photo Division, Shri Debatosh Sengupta are also seen.

Kasturba Road, formerly Sidney Road is a street in Bangalore, the capital of Karnataka, India, which is connected to M G Road to the north and J C Road to the south. Some important landmarks situated along Kasturba Road are Sree Kanteerava Stadium, Kanteerava Indoor Stadium, Cubbon Park, Government Museum, Venkatappa Art Gallery, Visvesvaraya Industrial and Technological Museum and UB City. A 600-year-old Ganesha temple is also situated on Kasturba Road.

It was earlier known as Sydney Road.

Other important landmarks close to the road are Karnataka High Court, Vidhana Soudha and Chinnaswamy Stadium.
