= Manohar Elavarthi =

Indian human rights activist

Manohar Elavarthi (born 4 September 1971) is a human rights activist who has been working for LGBTQ+ rights for over two decades. He is the founder of Sangama, a sexual minorities and sex workers' rights organisation. He also founded or headed rights-based NGOs like Aneka, Suraksha, Solidarity Foundation and Sanchaya Nele.

== Early life ==
Manohar was born in Chittoor, Andhra Pradesh. He attended school in Gyarampalle, Chittoor District, Andhra Pradesh.

== Advocacy ==
He supported the formation of independent advocacy-focused community organisations like the Karnataka Sexual Minorities Forum, the Karnataka Sex Workers Union and Karnataka Vikalachethanara Sanghatane, an organisation of persons with disabilities in Chikkaballapura District. Along with Shubha Chacko, he nurtured and built Sangama, Aneka and Solidarity Foundation.

He is involved in advocacy for the health rights of marginalised communities and mentored networks and platforms like South Asia Human Rights Association, Coalition for Sexual Minorities and Sexworkers Rights (based in Bangalore), National Network of Sex Workers, Bangalore Citizens Initiative for Peace, Narmada Solidarity Forum, and popularised the Freedom Miles concept for Gender Justice and North-East Solidarity. In response to the 2012 Delhi gang rape and murder, he organised a series of Freedom Miles or public walks for women's safety in Bangalore. He was instrumental in Sangama taking up HIV prevention work.

He was a member of the CCM-Global Fund (India Country Coordination Mechanism for The Global Fund to Fight AIDS, Tuberculosis and Malaria) and served as its vice-chair for a term of two years.
