= Bengaluru Namma Pride March =

Annual queer pride march in Karnataka, India

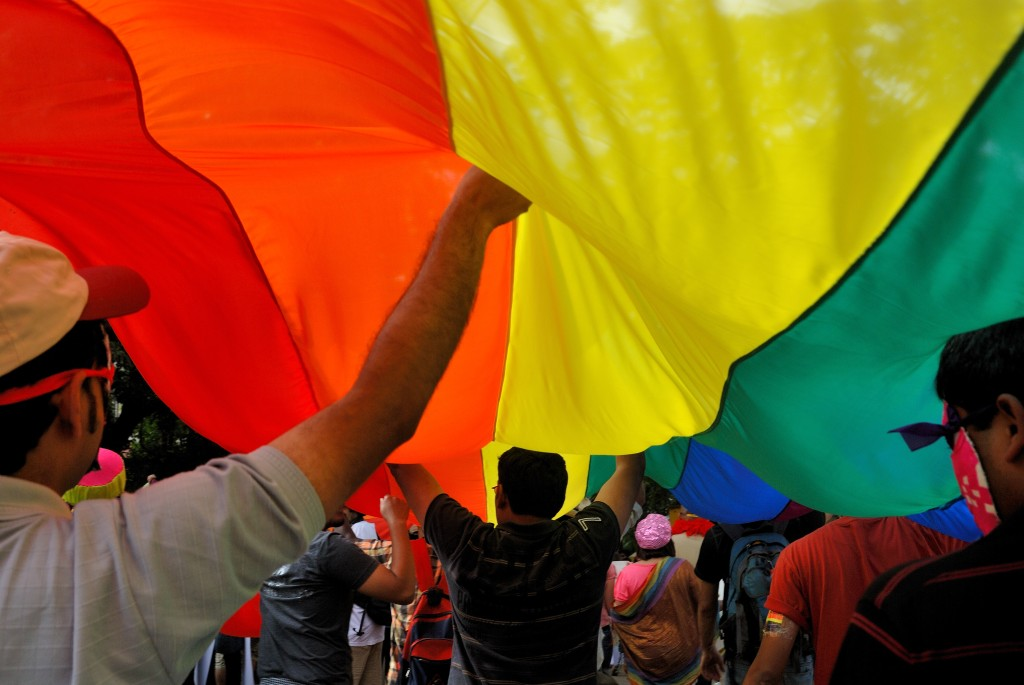
Bengaluru Pride Parade 2009

Bengaluru Namma Pride March (previously called the Bengaluru Pride and Karnataka Queer Habba) is a queer pride march that is held annually in the city of Bengaluru in Karnataka, India, since 2008. The march is organised by a coalition called Coalition for Sex Workers and Sexuality Minority Rights (CSMR). The pride march is preceded by a month of queer related events and activities.

== History ==
=== 2008 ===
The first pride march in Bengaluru was held on 29 June 2008. Two other cities in India – Delhi and Kolkata – held simultaneous pride marches on the same day. Around 700 people walked the march from the National College, Basavanagudi to Town Hall and demanded the removal of Section 377 of the Indian Penal Code.

=== 2009 ===
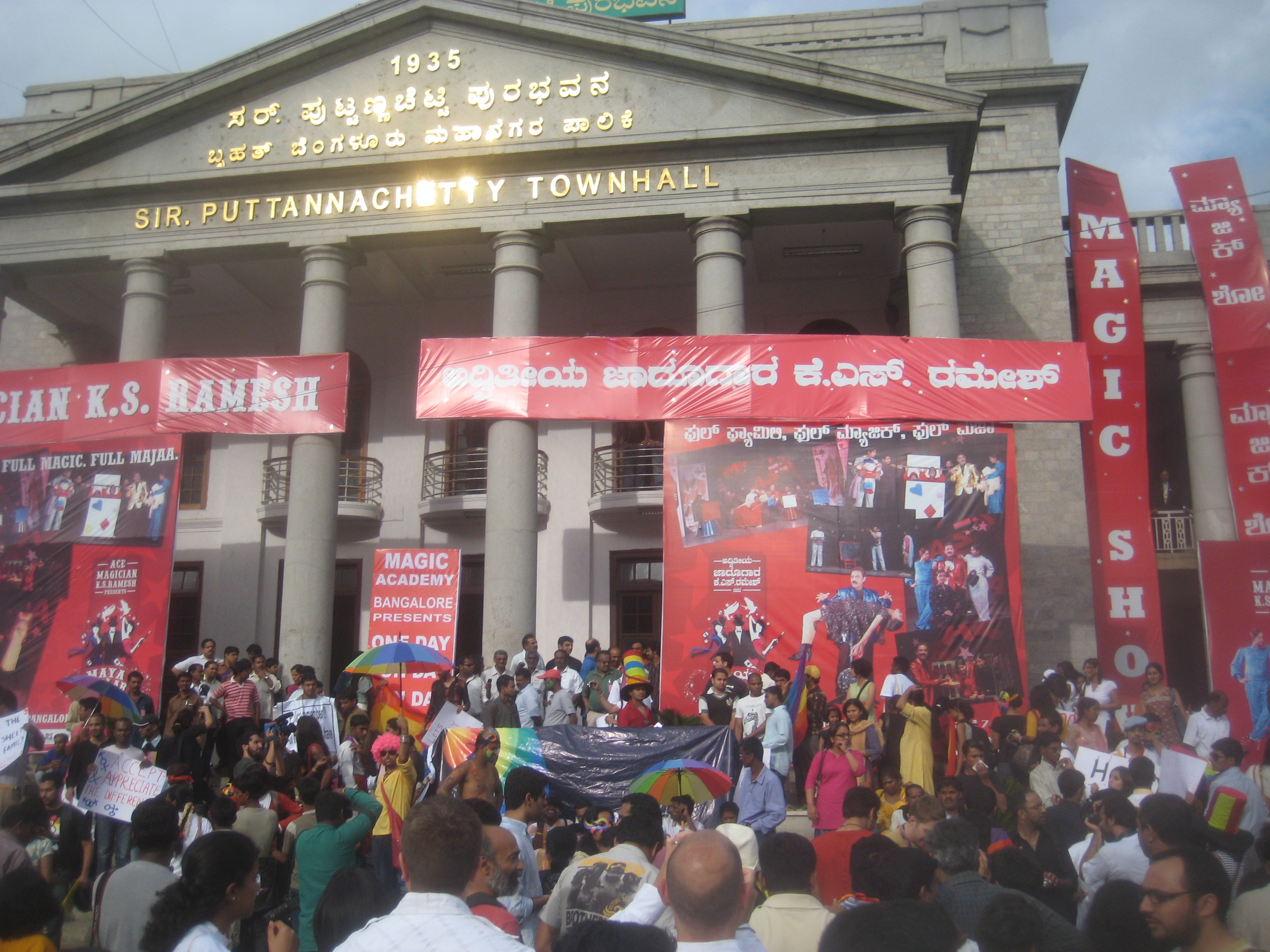
Bangalore Gay Pride Parade (2009) at Sir Puttannachetty Town Hall

The second Bengaluru Pride was held on 28 June and was preceded by a week long Karnataka Queer Habba '09. The Karnataka Queer Habba '09 had events like talks, seminars, film shows etc. Over 600 people walked the march from National College, Basavanagudi to Puttanachetty Town Hall. The focus of the march was colonial era law Section 377 that criminalised sex against the order of nature. Posters like "377 GO!" and "No Law for Love" were carried at the march.

=== 2010 ===
From 2010, pride march in Bengaluru is held in November. In 2010, it was held on 28 November. The Karnataka Queer Habba 2010 was held from 18 November to 28 November. Events organised during the Karnataka Queer Habba included a panel discussion titled "Love Across Boundaries", an art exhibit, a queer mela, and poetry reading. The march started from Tulasi Park, near the Majestic Bus Stand, and ended at the Town Hall.

=== 2011 ===
Bengaluru Pride March 2011 was held on 27 November. Around 1000 people took part in the pride march and walked from Tulasi Park to the Town Hall. The march had participation from companies like Google, IBM, and Goldman Sachs.

=== 2012 ===
The Bengaluru Pride March in 2012 was held on 2 December. The march was preceded by two weeks of events and festivities that began on 22 November. Like previous years, the march started from Tulasi Park and ended at Town Hall. Over 1000 people took part in the march and wore colourful attires and danced to dhol beats. The demands kept forward included repeal of the Karnataka Police Act 36 (A), free Sex Reassignment Surgery (SRS) by the government for transgender community, review of laws on marriage, inheritance and adoption.

=== 2013 ===
Bengaluru Pride March was held on 24 November in 2013 The marchers demanded the release of 14 sexual minority people arrested by police in the town of Hassan in Karnataka. There was a three week long Karnataka Queer Habba with events like plays, poster making, plays, panel discussion, queer marathon starting from 6 November and aimed at promoting intersectionality.

=== 2014 ===
In 2014, Bengaluru Pride March was held on 23 November and started from the City Railway Station and ended at the Malleswaram Grounds. Seven different events were held before the pride march. These included the launch of a quarterly Kannada language LGBT Magazine titled Ananya, a free HIV testing drive and a meet of People Living with HIV (PLHIV). Just a day after the pride march was held in 2014, Bengaluru police arrested 167 transgender people and moved them to Beggars Colony.

=== 2015 ===
The 8th edition of the Bengaluru Pride March was held on 22 November. Like the past years, Karnataka Queer Habba was held before the pride march, starting from 19 October with a Queer Quiz, a parents and families meet, a garage sale, poetry reading titled Writer's Corner: A Queer Poetry, a diversity fair etc. The pride march had over 2000 participants and followed the route of Tulasi Park to Town Hall.

=== 2016 ===
In 2016, pride march in Bengaluru was held on 20 November. This was also India's first disability-friendly pride march, and organisers had tied up with KickStart cabs and had a sign interpreter as well. The pride celebrations began from 1 October and involved various events like art festival, love stories, rainbow run, potluck, photo exhibitions, diversity fair, drag performances etc. Over 3000 participants took part in the pride march and walked from K.G. Road to Town Hall.

=== 2017 ===
The 2017 Bengaluru Pride March was held on 26 November, covering a distance of 4.5 km. It was the 10th anniversary for the Namma Pride. The March witnessed a gathering of 7,000 people, which is the largest turnout yet for the city's pride marches. Continuing the demands of repealing Section 377 of the Indian Penal Code, the protestors rallied for the right to self-identification, compulsory sexual identity education, creation of State Transgender Welfare Commission, repealing of Section 36A of the Karnataka Police Act and provision of shelters for transgender people. Many protestors criticized the Centre's Rights of Transgender Bill, stating that it criminalizes trans people instead of protecting their rights. The State Government's recent transgender policy received positive response from the participants.

=== 2018 ===
Bengaluru celebrated its 11th Namma Pride March under the banner of Coalition for Sex workers, Sexual & Sexuality Minorities' Rights (CSMR), Bengaluru. Around 3000 participants came forward to show their support to the LGBTQ+ community by marching from Lokmanya Tulsi Park to Town Hall in Bengaluru on 9 December.

The 2018 pride march was historic as it was the first march since the Supreme Court decriminalised homosexuality [Section 377] in September 2018. Hundreds of people participate every year to extend their solidarity to the LGBTQ+ community but after the momentous verdict against the archaic law, this pride march meant accepting and expressing oneself and being proud of one's identity. There are other demands of the community that are yet to be met by the Government of India. Some of their demands are the implementation of the Karnataka State Transgender Policy 2017. The LGBTQ+ community also demands implementation of sensitization programs in colleges, hospitals, and workplaces, granting unequivocal rights to civil union or marriage, surrogacy, adoption, inheritance, IVF etc.

The Pride March ended with a cultural performance, Hammeye Sanje, at the Samsa Bayalu Ranga Mandira near Townhall where members of the community sang and danced to the beat of the dhol.

=== 2019 ===
This year's Namma Pride focused on rejection of transgender bill that is to be presented in front of parliament sooner. Around 5000 people walked it with vibrant attires and those objecting the transgender bill dressed in black. Marchers danced to drum beats and raised slogans against the transgender bill. The demand if inclusion of LGBT+ community was also an objective of the pride march. The march started from Tulasi park and ended at Puttanna Chetty town hall with vibrant colours and joys which was a protest. The march concluded with cultural performances at Samsa Bhavan, and a post pride party was held at LaLit.

== See also ==
- Homosexuality in India
- LGBT culture in Bangalore
- LGBT culture in India
- LGBTQ rights in Karnataka
