= Queer Campus Bangalore =

Support group and safe space for queer youth in Bangalore, India

- Founded: 22 October 2011
- Type: Self-funded support group
- Purpose: Safe space for non-conforming sexual orientations and gender identities in Bangalore
- Location: Bangalore, Karnataka, India
- Region served: Bangalore India
- Method: Using support groups, discussions, etc
- Revenue: Self funded
- Website: http://www.queercampusbangalore.wordpress.com

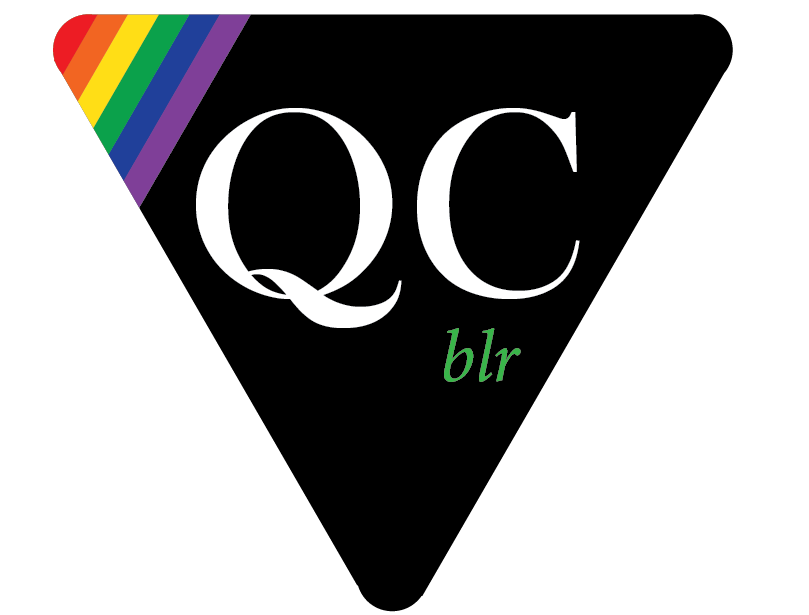
Queer Campus Logo designed by Dipanshu Shrivastav in 2014

Queer Campus Bangalore is a support group and safe space for queer youth in Bangalore, India. It is open to school, college, and university going youth in the city.

== History ==
In October 2011, a couple of college going residents of the city came together to form a support group for queer youth. This Bangalore chapter of Queer Campus was started as part of a network of student queer groups across the country, the first of which was started in Delhi in June 2010. Other chapters of Queer Campus were started in Pune and Hyderabad.

== Activities ==
1. QCB meets on Saturday afternoons at the Swabhava Trust office in Sampangi Ramnagar, in central Bangalore.
2. Quicknics - Some afternoons (mostly in the spring) are spent at Cubbon Park where members are welcome to bring in snacks and games.
3. Screenings - Queer related movies, TV shows, and documentaries are often screened.
4. Carnivals - Melas were organised in 2012 and 2013 which provided a platform for art, crafts, and performances.
5. Diversity Fair - QCB helped organise the mela or diversity fair, the penultimate event of the Bengaluru Namma Pride March from 2012 - 2014, and 2017.

== See also ==
- LGBT culture in Bangalore
