= Tulsi Gowda =

Indian environmentalist (1937 or 1938 – 2024)

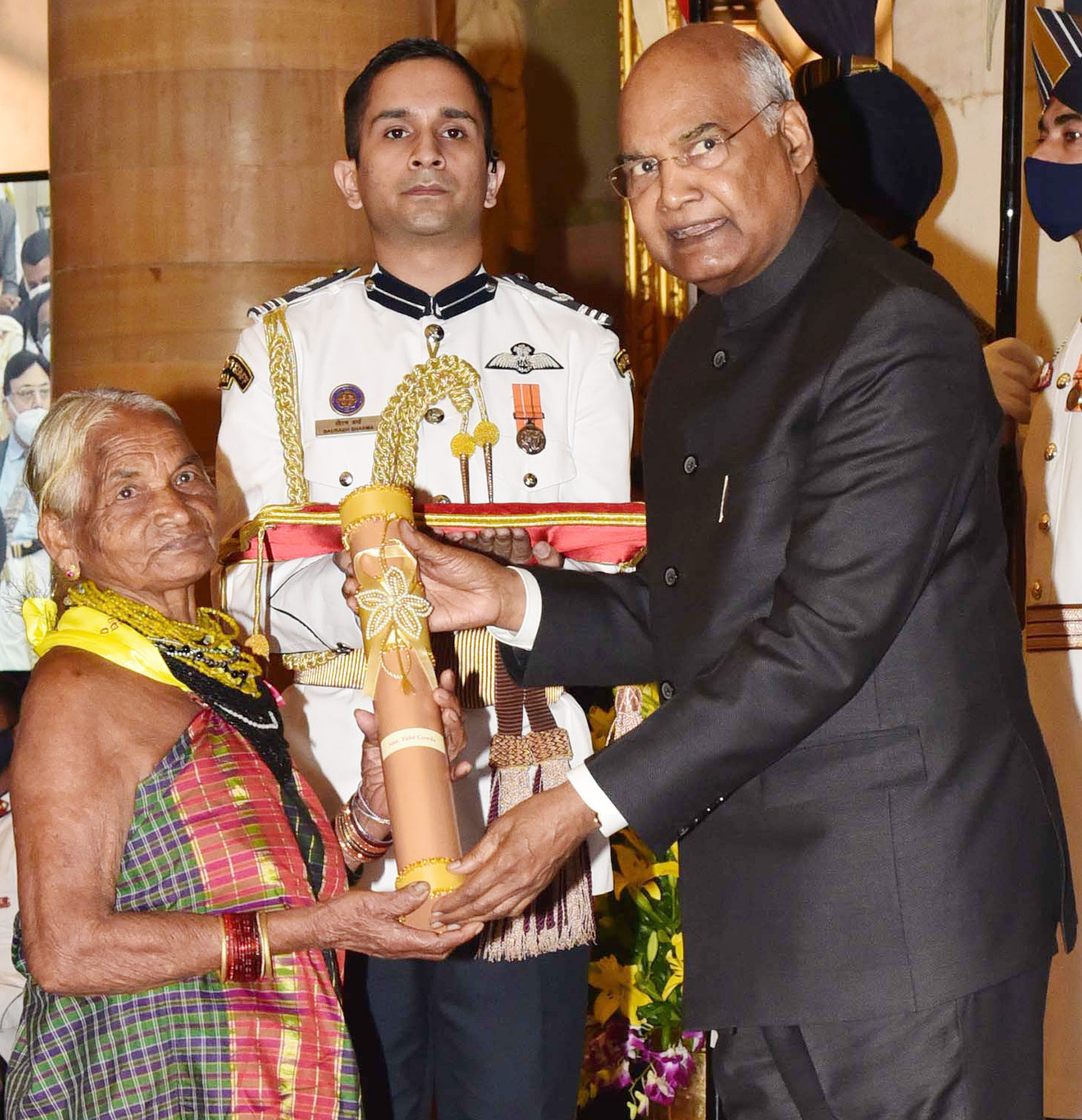
- Gowda receiving the Padma Shri award from President ram Nath Kovind
- Born: 1937 or 1938; Honnali, Mysore State, India
- Died: 16 December 2024 (aged 86); Honnali, Uttara Kannada district, Karnataka, India
- Other name: Encyclopedia of the forest
- Occupation: Environmentalist
- Honours: Padma Shri (2020); Indira Priyadarshini Vrikshamitra Awards (1986); Rajyotsava Award (1999)

Tulsi Gowda (1937 or 1938 – 16 December 2024) was an Indian environmentalist from Honnali village. She planted more than 30,000 saplings and looked after the nurseries of the Forest Department. Her work has been honoured by the Government of India and other organisations. In 2021, the Government of India awarded her the Padma Shri, the country's fourth highest civilian award. She is known as the "Encyclopedia of the Forest" for her ability to recognise the mother tree of any species of tree.

== Early life and career ==
Tulsi Gowda was born into the Halakki tribal family within the Honnalli village, a settlement transitioning between rural and urban within the Uttara Kannada district in the Indian state of Karnataka. Karnataka is a state in South India known for its eco-tourism, with over twenty-five wildlife sanctuaries and five national parks.

Tulsi Gowda was born into an impoverished family, and her father died when she was 2 years old, so she had to work alongside her mother as a day labourer at a local nursery once she was old enough. She did not receive a formal education or learn to read.

At the nursery, Gowda was responsible for taking care of the seeds that were to be grown and harvested at the Karnataka Forestry Department, specifically for seeds intended as a part of the Agasur seedbed. Gowda continued working at the nursery alongside her mother as a daily wage worker for 35 years until she was offered a permanent position in recognition of her work towards conservation, and her knowledge of botany. She worked at the nursery in this permanent position for 15 years before retiring at the age of seventy. During her time at the nursery, she contributed and worked directly on the afforestation efforts of the forest department by using traditional knowledge of the land. As well as planting saplings, she worked to prevent poachers and forest fires from destroying the wildlife.

Gowda spent over sixty years working at the Karnataka Forest Department. This comprises one community reserve, five tiger reserves, fifteen conservation reserves and thirty wildlife sanctuaries. It describes its aim as reconnecting communities and villages with nature, working towards a future where one-third of the area of the state has forest or tree cover.

== Knowledge ==
Gowda was known by environmentalists as the "Encyclopedia of the Forest" and by her tribe as the "tree goddess" because of her knowledge of the forest and its plants. She is known for her ability to identify the mother tree of every species of tree in the forest no matter where it is. Mother trees are significant because of their age and size, which make them the most connected nodes in the forest. These underground nodes are used to connect mother trees with saplings and seedlings as the mother tree exchanges nitrogen and nutrients. Gowda was also an expert in seed collecting, the extraction of seeds from mother trees in order to regenerate and regrow entire plant species. It is a difficult process as the seeds must be collected at the peak of germination from the mother tree in order to ensure the survival of the seedlings and Gowda was able to work out this exact time.

Gowda could not explain how she gathered her knowledge of the forest, but said it is as if she can "speak the language of the forest." In the traditions of her tribe, the Halakki Vokkaliga, the matriarchy is connected to nature and cares for the land.

== Legacy ==
Gowda is estimated to have planted in the range of one lakh (100,000) trees in Karnataka on her own. These contributions have made a lasting impact on the members of her community as well. Nagaraja Gowda of Uttara Kannada District, who works for the welfare of the Halakki tribe, says Gowda is the pride of their community: "she has invaluable knowledge of the forest and medicinal plants. Nobody has documented it and she is not a good communicator, so it is difficult to understand her contribution unless you've seen her work."

Yellappa Reddy, a retired officer, also commends Gowda's lasting commitment to her community, citing the fact that Gowda has planted and identified over 300 medicinal plants that have since been used to treat ailments within their village.

Although Gowda had retired from the Karnataka Forestry Department, she continued to teach the children of her village about the importance of the forest as well as how to find and care for seeds.

Gowda also championed women's rights within her village. When another Halakki woman was threatened with a gun after an altercation, Gowda came to her aid stating that she will "protest fiercely if the perpetrator of the crime isn't punished."

== Death ==
Gowda died on 16 December 2024, at the age of 86.

== Awards and recognition ==
In 1986, Gowda received the Indira Priyadarshini Vrikshamitra Award, also known as the IPVM award. The IPVM award recognizes pioneering contributions made by individuals or institutions to afforestation and wasteland development.

In 1999, Gowda received the Karnataka Rajyotsava Award, sometimes known as the Kannada Rajyotsava Award, the "second highest civilian honour of the Karnataka state of India". It is given yearly to distinguished citizens of Karnataka State aged over sixty.

On 8 November 2020, the Government of India awarded Gowda the Padma Shri award, the fourth highest award given to citizens of India. The Padma Shri, also commonly spelled as Padma Shree, is an award given every year on India's Republic Day by the Government of India. Gowda said that, while she is glad to have received the Padma Shri, she "values the forests and trees more".

== See also ==
- Halakki Vokkaliga
- Karnataka
- Botany
- Environmental protection
