= Bangalore Queer Film Festival =

LGBTQ film festival in India

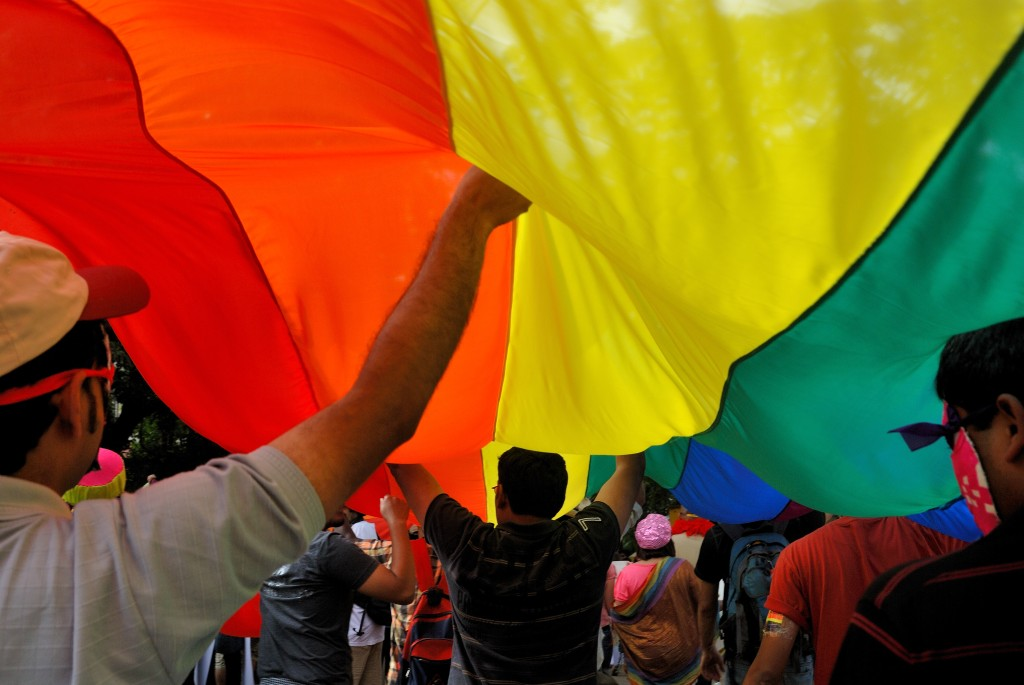
- Location: Bangalore, India
- Founded: 2008
- Language: International
- Website: Bangalore Queer Film Festival

The Bangalore Queer Film Festival is an annual LGBT event that has been held in Bangalore, India since the year 2008. The event carefully selects queer films from all over the world and brings them to an ever-growing Bangalore audience.

== Background ==
BQFF came into existence in the year 2008 and the very first one was hosted by Pedestrian Pictures, Swabhava, Sangama (human rights group) and Good As You.

Since its inception, it has become an entrenched part of the cultural landscape of Bangalore. The festival serves as a space for LGBT (Lesbian, Gay, Bisexual, Transgender) concerns to be voiced through the medium of moving image. BQFF focuses on both straightforward LGBT films and wildly queer and radical films.

== BQFF 2014 ==
The BQFF is a go-to festival for South India’s cinema lovers and has seen thousands of viewers during past screenings. It also hosts filmmakers and producers from around the world and provides opportunities for new collaborations in cinema. The Bangalore Queer Film Festival (BQFF) held its 6th edition in February 2014. It celebrated cinema on lesbian, gay, bisexual, transgender, hijra, intersex (LGBT) and other sexual and gender minorities in India. As one of the more popular queer film festivals in India, BQFF showcased over 50 international films, a photo exhibition, panel discussions on important issues and cultural performances. The festival was held over 3 days at the Alliance Française de Bangalore, Vasanthnagar. The festival in 2014 was spread over three days, and was the biggest ever with 91 films from 24 countries that were screened. There was music, dance and poetry recitation in the evening, drawing not only for members of the LGBT community but also their allies in the IT city.

=== BQFF 2014 Film Screenings ===
The Film screenings happened across three days during 28 February and 1–2 March 2014. Below is a list of the films that were screened.

28 February 2014
Day1.

Film title	Country	Timing
Margaritas	Serbia	09:30 am
Telling Tales	South Africa	09:46 am
Breaking out of the Box	South Africa	
Damned If You Don't	US	
Chaleur Humaine (Human Warmth)	Belgium	
Beyond Binary	India	
Partir (Leaving)	Portugal	
Blush	France	
Muro (Wall)	Spain	
You are my Brother	India	
Rue Curiol (Curiol Street)	France	
Angel	France/Eucador	
Aan Poovu (Male Flower)	India	
Bioscope	India	
Waiting in wilderness	India	
Milk & Vodka	Australia	
La Santa(The Blessed)	Chile	
Knighthood	Taiwan	
The Kiss	Poland	
Mia	Argentina	
Joaquin La Habana: Living between worlds	Germany	
The Brave Unseen	South Africa	
Somagwaza	South Africa	
Acceptance	India	
Rotula (Label)	Brazil	
Rainbow Popcorn	Taiwan	
One Zero One: The Story of Cybersissy and Babyjane	Germany	
Edie & Thea: A Very Long Engagement	US	
Kuch Palon Mein(In some moments)	India	
Irene	Brazil	
Aquaporko!	Australia	
Her name is Sowmya	India	

1 March 2014
Day2

Film title	Country	Timing
Camp Beaverton: Meet the Beavers	US	09:30 am
The Beginning	Russia	10:30 am
Feel Lost	Spain	
Morning	France	
Kuch Palon Mein(In some moments)	India	
Boy	Denmark	
Transgressions	India	
Accsex	India	
Mumbai Police	India	
Nubes Flotantes(Wandering Clouds)	USA/Mexico	
Brother and Sister	US	
Pas	US	
Frangipani	Sri Lanka	
In Berlin we die alone	Germany/Romania	
Still Black: A portrait of black Transmen	US	
The Invisible Men	Israel/The Netherlands	
Paper Flowers	India	
EDSAXXX	Philippines	
Chuppan Chupai (Hide and Seek)	Denmark/Pakistan	
Audre Lorde: The Berlin Years(1984-1992)	Germany	
Damned If You Don't	US	
Joie!	Canada	
And You Thought You Knew Me	India	
Disrupted	Spain	
Rotulo(Label)	Brazil	
Acceptance	India	
Aquaporko!	Australia	
Rainbows Are Real	India	
Bruno & Earlene Go to Vegas	US	
... Ebang Bewarish ("... and the unclaimed")	India	
Just Two Steps Away	India	
The Falceto Jazz Club	Australia	
PR - Public Relations	India	
Scaffolding	Spain	
Irene	Brazil	
The Egg	Australia	
Cannibales(Cannibals)	Spain	
I've Only Just Begun	Finland	
The Language Of Love	Australia	
Mecs Meufs (Guys Girls)	France	
Ink Deep	France	
Out In East Berlin	Germany	
Miniatures	Spain	
Angel	France/Ecuador	
Kusum	India	
Meghadhanushya: The Colour Of Life	India	
Rules Of The Road	US	
Verona	Brazil	
The Invisible Men	Israel/The Netherlands	
Partil(Leaving)	Portugal	
Change Over Time	US	
Chaleur Humaine (Human Warmth)	Belgium	
Mondo Sopra La Testa (The World Above Head)	Italy	
Knightwood	Taiwan	
The Kiss	Poland	
XXY	Argentina	
Grace	Israel	
Still Black: A portrait of Black Transmen	US	

== BQFF 2016 ==
The 2016 edition of the Bengaluru Queer Film Festival was organised from 26 to 28 February. Over the course of these three days, films included:

Film title	Country
In Black and White	Canada
Ten Cents a Dance: Parallax	Canada
Kipling Meets the Cowboys	Canada

== See also ==
- List of LGBT film festivals

== External Links on Past Events ==
- 2013 Deccan Herald News
- 2012 BQFF News
- 2010 Tehelka Article
- WHaQ Blog
