= Teresa of St. Rose of Lima =

Indian Servant of God

Servant Of God Teresa of St. Rose of Lima CSST
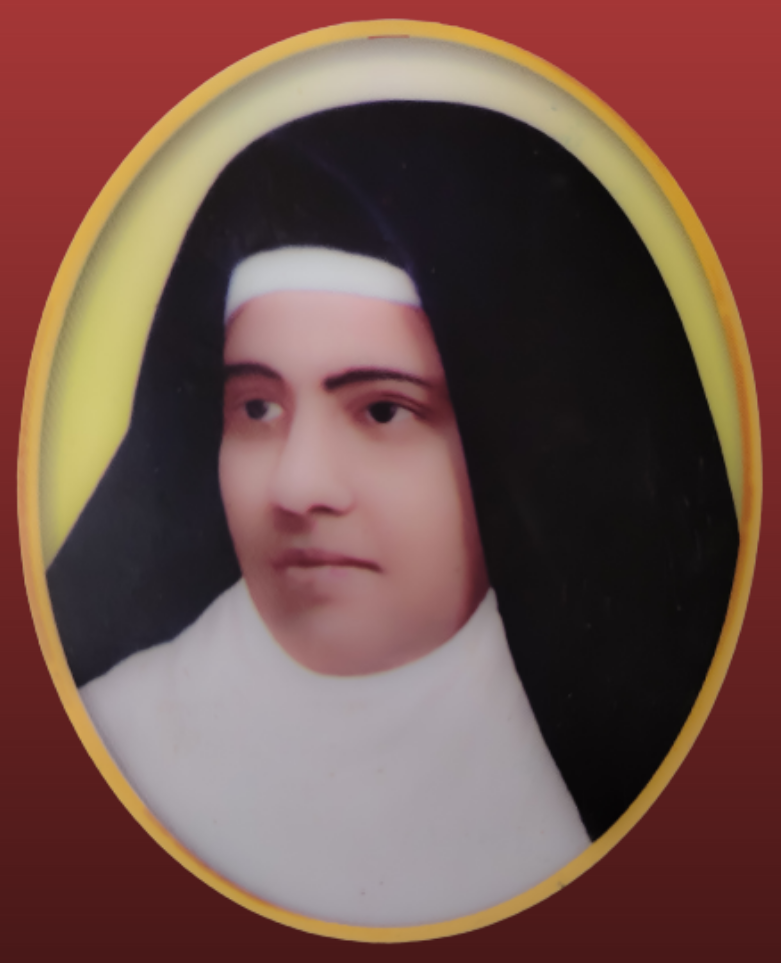
- Mother Teresa of St. Rose of Lima
- Born: 29 January 1858; George Town, Madras, India
- Died: 12 September 1902 (aged 44); Mangapatnam, Cuddapah, India

Teresa of St. Rose of Lima, CSST was an Indian Catholic religious sister and the founder of the Institute of the Carmelite Sisters of Saint Teresa in Kerala, India.

== Life ==
Teresa of St. Rose of Lima was born on 29 January 1858 in George Town, Madras, India, to Peter D'Lima and Mary D'Lima. She received the name Mary Grace on baptism. She studied with the Presentation Sisters at George Town, Madras. After completing the schoolmistresses test, she joined the staff of St. Xavier's Free School, George Town, Madras in 1875. She took charge of St Joseph's School, Alleppey, Kerala, as the headmistress in 1879.

In May 1882 she was received as a postulant by the priest Candidus. She received formation directly from the Carmelite fathers. On 29 April 1883, she was vested and given the name Teresa of St. Rose of Lima. She made her religious profession as a Carmelite Tertiary at St. Joseph's Convent, Alleppey on 25 May 1885. She founded the Third Order of Our Lady of Mount Carmel known today as the Institute of the Carmelite Sisters of Saint Teresa (CSST) on 24 April 1887 in Ernakulam, Kerala, India, and also founded St. Teresa's English Medium School for Girls on 9 May 1887.

She died in a train accident on 12 September 1902 at Mangapatnam, Cuddapah, Andhra Pradesh, India.

== Beatification process ==
The Archbishop of Bengaluru diocese Bernard Moras initiated the diocesan inquiry of cause of beatification and canonization of Teresa on 22 August 2015 and she was declared a Servant of God.

== In popular culture ==
Teresa had a dream, an Indian English-language biographical film directed by Raju Abraham was released in 2020. Produced by the Carmelite Sisters of St. Teresa, it focuses on her missionary work in India.
