= Kothnur =

Kothnur Kothnuru Ramanagara
- city
- Nickname: Kothanur street
- Location in Karnataka, India
- Coordinates: 12.868°N 77.583°E
- India: India
- State: Karnataka
- District: Bangalore

Population (2001)
  - Total: 20,835

Languages
  - Official: Kannada
- Time zone: UTC+5:30 (IST)
- ISO 3166 code: IN-KA
- Vehicle registration: KA
- Website: karnataka.gov.in

Kothnur is a census town in Bangalore district in the Indian state of Karnataka.

== Demographics ==
As of 2001 India census, Kothnur had a population of 20,835. Males constitute 53% of the population and females 47%. Koththanur has an average literacy rate of 67%, higher than the national average of 59.5%: male literacy is 73%, and female literacy is 61%. In Kothnur, 13% of the population is under 6 years of age.

== Schools & Colleges ==
- Kristu Jayanti University
