= Rajini Rao =

American physiologist

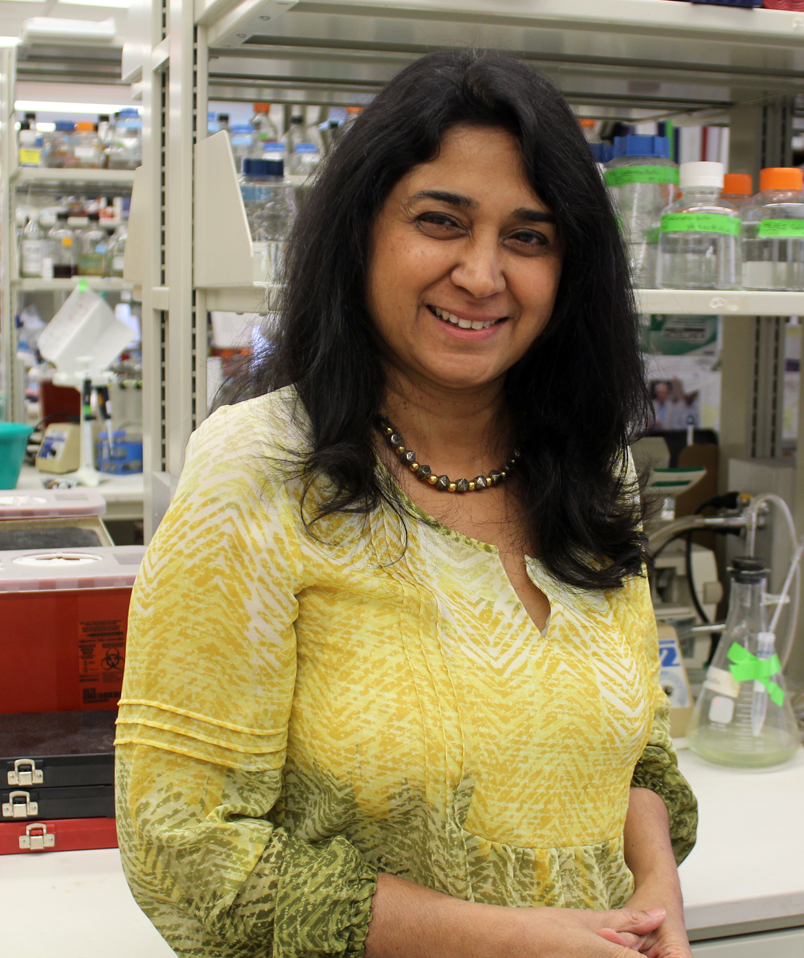
- Born: India
- Education: Mount Carmel College; University of Rochester
- Known for: Physiology of cation transport in health and disease
- Awards: 2009 Hans Prochaska Memorial Lecturer, 2009 Johns Hopkins Professors Award for Excellence in Teaching in Preclinical Sciences
- Scientific career
- Fields: Physiology, cation transport
- Workplaces: Johns Hopkins School of Medicine

Rajini Rao is an American physiologist who is a professor at Johns Hopkins University School of Medicine. Rao is also the director of the Graduate Program in Cellular and Molecular Medicine and is the principal investigator of the Rao Lab. She is an elected fellow of the American Association for the Advancement of Science, Rao discovers novel ion channels and explores their roles in human health and disease. The Rao Lab identified the oncogenic role of SPCA2 in breast cancer through an aberrant method of signalling to calcium channels.

== Early life and education ==
Rao was born in India. She pursued her undergraduate degree in chemistry and biology in 1980 at Mount Carmel College in Bangalore. Rao graduated with a Bachelor of Science in 1983. Rao then moved to the United States to conduct her graduate studies at the University of Rochester in Rochester, New York. Under the mentorship of Alan E. Senior, Rao explored the biochemistry of the alpha subunit of Escherichia coli F1-ATPase enzyme. In her graduate work, Rao discovered that three catalytic sites in the ATPase enzyme needed to interact to achieve maximal enzymatic rate and that this occurs in a cyclical mechanism. She later found that the binding of ATP to the alpha subunit of the F1-ATPase and the associated conformational changes are abolished when the Lysine-175 residue is mutated. Her work suggests a critical role for this specific residue on the nucleotide binding of ATP to the ATPase enzyme.

Following the completion of her PhD in 1988, Rao pursued postdoctoral work at Yale University in New Haven, Connecticut. Rao worked under the mentorship of Carolyn Slayman to gain experience in the field of genetics. Rao was funded by an American Heart Association Postdoctoral Fellowship from 1990 to 1991. Rao's work explored the functions of the H+-ATPase in yeast. She used site directed mutagenesis to probe the role of specific amino acid residues in the function of the enzyme. Rao also developed a novel system with which to probe the function and structure of the H+ATPase. Since ATPases are essential for the survival of a cell, mutating them will lead to cell death and render the preparation difficult to study. In order to maintain wildtype expression of ATPases while studying the effects of certain mutations on ATPase function, Rao created a way to rapidly express the mutant ATPase in a secretory vesicle pool such that these vesicles could be isolated to study the catalytics of the enzyme. Following her postdoctoral work, Rao worked for one year as an Associate Research Scientist in the Department of Genetics at Yale University.

== Career and research ==
In 1993, Rao was recruited to Johns Hopkins School of Medicine where she became an assistant professor in the Department of Physiology. In 1998, Rao was promoted to associate professor and then in 2004, she became the first female full professor in the Department of Physiology. In 2008, Rao was promoted to director of the Graduate Training Program in Cellular and Molecular Medicine. Rao also acts as a faculty mentor within several other departments at Johns Hopkins and teaches several classes on Pathways and Regulation, the Human Body, and Molecules and Cells. Rao is a member of the American Association of Science the Federation of American Society of Experimental Biology.

As the principal investigator of the Rao Lab, Rao leads a research program focused on exploring the role of intracellular cation transport in health and disease. The lab uses yeast as a model organism with which to study the biology of cation transport channels. The specific transporters they focus on are H+-ATPases, Ca2+-ATPases, and Na+/H+ exchangers. The Rao Lab defined the secretory pathway Ca2+, Mn2+-ATPases (SPCA) and later discovered their roles in breast cancer development. A specific isoform of SPCA that is upregulated in breast cancer cells seemed to mediate aberrant calcium signalling, leading to increased calcium influx and promote tumorigenesis.

=== Cation transporters in neurological disease ===
After becoming the first to clone the endosomal Na+(K+)/H+ exchanger (eNHE) and recognize it as a separate exchanger from the plasma membrane NHE, the Rao Lab has begun to explore this exchanger in the context of neurological diseases including autism. Alzheimer's disease, and glioblastoma. Since rare mutations in the NHE gene had been associated with autism, Rao probed the function of autism-associated variants of this transporter. Normally, the transporter mediates increased uptake of glutamate and stabilizes expression of the transferrin receptor and the GLAST transporter. However, the variants of the NHE in autism led to loss of function in the glial cells called astrocytes. Their finding highlighted the possibility of autism-associated mutations exerting their effects through loss of astrocyte function in the brain. The Rao Lab then discovered that NHE9 expression in glioblastoma is associated with poor clinical prognosis. NHE9 is an exchanger of Na+ and H+, and when blocked in glioblastoma it attenuates tumor growth and improves the efficacy of typical glioblastoma treatment, EGFR inhibitors. Cation channels have also been associated with the pathogenesis of Alzheimer's disease. The Rao Lab found in 2018 that defects in the NHE6 exchanger of Na+ and H+ led to defective clearance of amyloid beta by astrocytes. Through epigenetic modulation, they were able to restore the ability of NHE6 to maintain alkalinity in the endosome and this improved amyloid beta clearance by astrocytes. In 2020, the Rao group published a review on the role of tumor acidification and cancer metastasis.

== Awards and honors ==
- 2009: Hans Prochaska Memorial Lecturer at Johns Hopkins
- 2009: Teacher of the Year Award, The Johns Hopkins University School of Medicine
- 2009: Johns Hopkins Professors Award for Excellence in Teaching in Preclinical Sciences
- 2006: Keynote speaker for Pan American Plant Membrane Biology Workshop
- 2001–2003: Nico Van Uden Keynote Speaker for SMYTE conferences at Crete and Bonn
- 1994–1997: American Cancer Society Junior Faculty Award

== Selected publications ==
- Kondapalli, KC, Llongueras, JP, Capilla-Gonzalez, V, Hack, A, Smith, C, Guerrero-Cazares, H, Quinones-Hinojosa, A, and Rao, R. (2015) A leak pathway for luminal protons in endosomes drives oncogenic signaling in glioblastoma. Nature Communications 6 Article number: 6289 doi:10.1038/ncomms7289
- Hack A, Schushan M, Landau M, Ben-Tal N, Rao R. "Functional evaluation of autism-associated mutations in NHE9." Nat Commun. 2013;4:2510. doi: 10.1038/ncomms3510.
- Patenaude C, Zhang Y, Cormack B, Köhler J, Rao R. "Essential role for vacuolar acidification in Candida albicans virulence." J Biol Chem. 2013 Sep 6;288(36):26256-64. doi: 10.1074/jbc.M113.494815. Epub 2013 Jul 24.
- Cross BM, Hack A, Reinhardt TA, Rao R. "SPCA2 regulates Orai1 trafficking and store independent Ca2+ entry in a model of lactation." PLoS One. 2013 Jun 28;8(6):e67348. doi: 10.1371/journal.pone.0067348. Print 2013.
- Shim JS, Rao R, Beebe K, Neckers L, Han I, Nahta R, Liu JO. "Selective inhibition of HER2-positive breast cancer cells by the HIV protease inhibitor nelfinavir." J Natl Cancer Inst. 2012 Oct 17;104(20):1576-90. doi: 10.1093/jnci/djs396. Epub 2012 Oct 5.
- Kondapalli KC, Kallay LM, Muszelik M, Rao R. "Unconventional chemiosmotic coupling of NHA2, a mammalian Na+/H+ antiporter, to a plasma membrane H+ gradient." J Biol Chem. 2012 Oct 19;287(43):36239-50. doi: 10.1074/jbc.M112.403550. Epub 2012 Sep 4.
- Feng, M., Grice, D., Faddy, H.M., Ngyuen, N., Leitch, S., Wang, Y., Muend, S., Kenny, P.A., Sukumar, S., Roberts-Thomson, S., Monteith, G., and Rao, R. (2010) Store-independent activation of Orai1 by SPCA2 in mammary tumors. Cell 143, 84–98.
