= Carmelite Sisters of Saint Teresa =

Roman Catholic religious order

- Sororum Carmelitarum Sanctae Teresiae
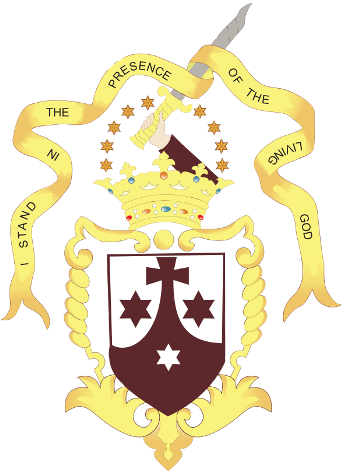
- Abbreviation: C.S.S.T.
- Formation: April 24, 1887; 139 years ago
- Founder: Sister Teresa of St. Rose of Lima
- Type: Centralized Religious Institute of Consecrated Life of Pontifical Right (for Women)
- Headquarters: Hiremath Layout, Kothanur, Bengaluru, Karnataka, India
- Superior general: Sr. Chris
- Website: carmelitesistersofstteresa.org

The Carmelite Sisters of Saint Teresa (CSST) is a religious institute of the Catholic Church for women. The institute was founded in 1887 in Ernakulam, Kerala, India. The order was founded by Sister Teresa of St. Rose of Lima. The order is a branch of the Tertiary Carmelite Congregation known as the Third order of Our Lady of Mt. Carmel and St. Teresa.

== History ==
The Carmelite Sisters of Saint Teresa have their roots in the Third Order of Our Lady of Mount Carmel and St. Teresa, a tertiary congregation established in Kerala in the 19th century. The congregation was founded in 1887 by Sister Teresa of St. Rose of Lima, a Carmelite Tertiary who was sent to Ernakulam by Archbishop Leonard Mellano of Verapoly. Sister Teresa was tasked with starting a religious community of sisters and founding an English medium school for girls in the town.

Sister Teresa, along with a few other sisters, started the St. Teresa's Convent in Ernakulam, which would become the cradle of the CSST Institute. The congregation was initially diocesan, and its history is closely intertwined with the history of the church in Kerala and the erection of the Archdiocese of Verapoly.

Over the years, the Carmelite Sisters of Saint Teresa have expanded their presence in India and have established various educational institutions across the country. Today, the congregation has more than 1,500 sisters and operates over 250 schools and other educational institutions in different parts of India.
