= Ravindra Kalakshetra =

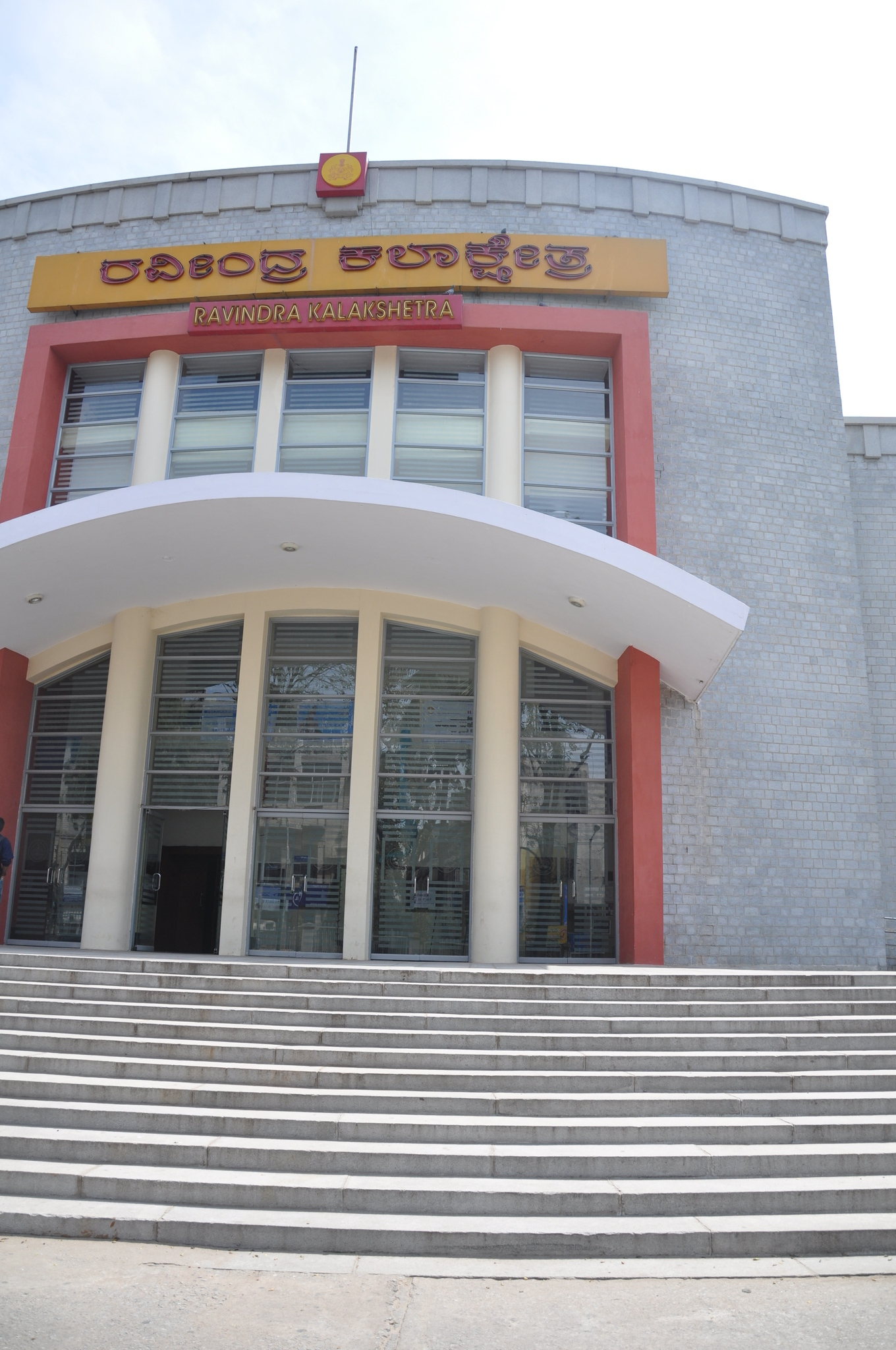
- Address: J C Road, Near Puttanna Chetty Town Hall; Bangalore; India
- Capacity: 900

Construction
- Opened: 9 March 1963
- Years active: 1963 onwards
- Architect: Charles Wilson

Website
- http://rangamandira.karnataka.gov.in/

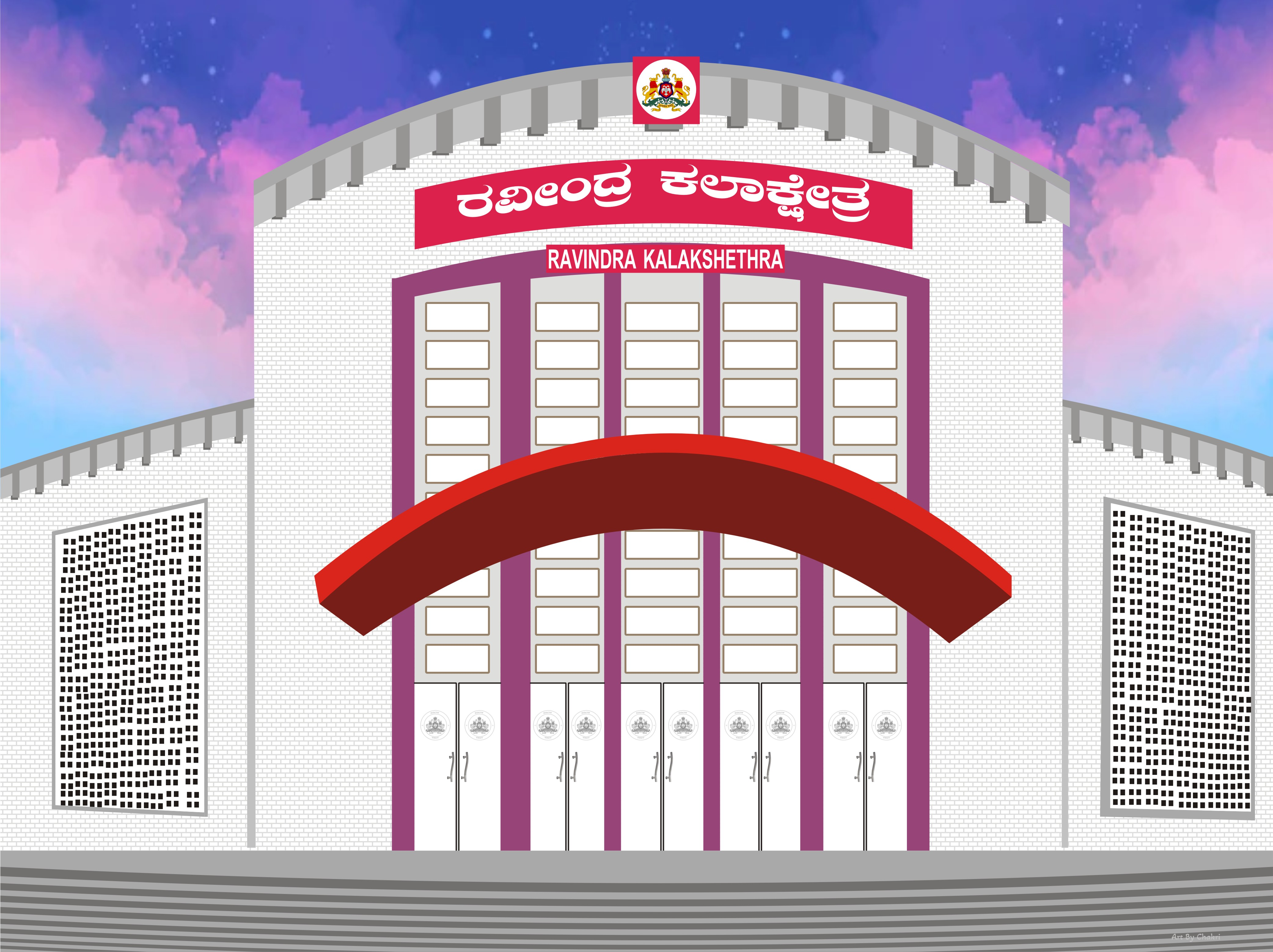

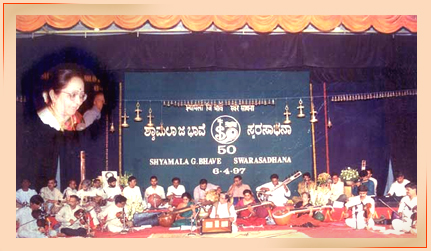
Performance at Ravindra Kalashektra

Ravindra Kalakshetra is a cultural centre in Bangalore which provides a home for musical and theatrical performances. Located in heart of Bangalore city, it was built to commemorate the birth centenary of Nobel laureate Rabindranath Tagore. Many well known theatre and film personalities like Umashree, Mukhyamantri Chandru, T. S. Nagabharana, Master Hirannaiah, C. R. Simha, T. N. Seetharam, and Prakash Rai among others have performed at Kalashektra.

== History ==
In 1959, a high-level committee was formed to build the Kalakshetra under the chairmanship of then chief minister B. D. Jatti, with cultural stalwarts like Shivaram Karanth, Mallikarjuna Mansur, Gorur Ramaswamy Iyengar, T. Chowdaiah and Vimala Rangachar as members. The auditorium was to commemorate the birth centenary of the great poet and Nobel laureate Rabindranath Tagore. They began to collect funds towards the purpose. Famous personalities like Sivaji Ganesan, a popular Tamil cine actor and others came forward to contribute for the construction of the Kalakshetra. The foundation stone for the Kalakshetra was laid on 16 September 1960. It was designed by architect Charles Wilson and chief engineer BR Manikyam. The Kalakshetra was eventually inaugurated on 9 March 1963 by Dr Humayun Kabir, the then Union Minister for Education of Karnataka.

== Facilities ==
The Kalakshetra has a modern and technically developed auditorium with 900-seat capacity, including 400 in balcony, lighting systems, an acoustics and many other facilities. In the entrance stands a statue of the poet in a glass showcase that greets the audience visiting the kalakshetra. Audio system, imported from France, includes special front speakers for VIP members in the front row and monitor speakers for the performers on the stage. The entire theatre is equipped with computerized lighting system, with around 120 lights. It also has proper communication system between backstage and control system using Production Intercom Communication System. It also has an open air theatre called ‛Samsa Bayalu Rangamandira’, named after famous Kannada playwright Samsa.
