= Good As You =

Indian LGBTQ support and social group

- Founded: 1994
- Founder: LGBTQ rights activists from Bangalore
- Type: Self-funded support group
- Purpose: Equal rights for sexual and gender minorities in India
- Location: Bangalore, India
- Origins: Bangalore, India
- Region served: India
- Method: Using support groups, discussions, etc
- Revenue: Self funded
- Website: http://www.oocities.org/goodasyoubangalore

Good As You is a support and social group for LGBTQ people and others questioning their gender and sexuality in Bangalore. It started in 1994 and is one of the longest surviving groups that advocates equal rights for homosexuals and other gender and sexual minorities in Bangalore.

== History ==
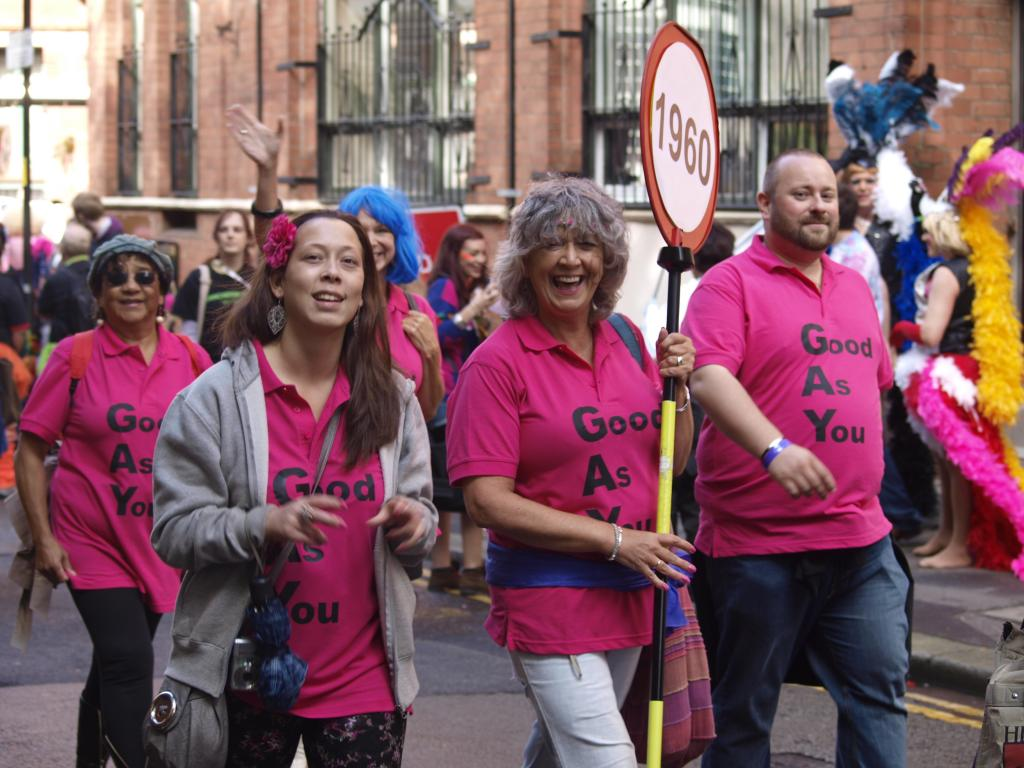
Marchers representing Good As You at Manchester Pride 2010

In 1994, a few LGBT rights activists gathered at a local restaurant and decided to have a discussion forum for the sexual minorities at Bangalore. Within a week, it was decided that the group name would be Good As You, and meetings started taking place weekly. Samraksha, an AIDS counselling center, provided their office space for the meetups.

Currently the weekly meetups happen at Swabhava office. Since Covid-19 Pandemic, the meetings happen both online and offline.

== Activities ==
1. Good As You is patron to an LGBT newsletter called Sangha Mitra (now Sangamithra, ಸಂಗಮಿತ್ರ) which is published from Bangalore. 9 issues have been printed so far since 1998. A new edition marking the 30th Anniversary of the Group is in the offing with the theme 'An Ode to the Past, a Nod to the Future!' 'ನೆನ್ನೆಯ ನೆನೆಯುತ್ತ ನಾಳಿನತ್ತ ನಡಿಗೆ’.
2. Good As You helped students of National Law School of India, University to organise the country's first Gay Rights Seminar in 1997.
3. Good As You also co-sponsored "Emerging Gay Spaces in Bangalore" (a bi-lingual public lecture in English and Kannada, co-sponsored with Sabrang) in 1998.
4. Various picnics and social meetings have been organised by members of Good As You on different occasions bringing the community closer together.
5. 30 November 2000. Presentation by Dr. Shekhar Seshadri on child abuse.
6. 17 December 2000. Manish leads the first bakery workshop.
7. 1 July 2001, Good As You members took part in the public meeting 'Breaking the Silence: Sexuality Minorities Speak Out', organised by the Coalition for Sexuality Minority Rights.
8. Bangalore Queer Film Festival : The annual queer film festival in Bangalore that happens in Feb every year was initially organized by Vinay Chandran with Good As You along with other collectives in the city.
9. Good As You meetings: Thursdays 7pm-9pm at Swabhava. They discuss various topics that effect Queer people in India, from Sec.377 to cultural prejudice against unmarried people.
10. "Married & Queer" sub-group of Goodasyou has queer people entangled in heterosexual marriages.
11. Film screenings at Swabhava every Saturday 6PM onwards.
12. Gay Runners & Brunch: Sundays Cubbon Park 9:30; Airlines 10:30 - 12:30
13. In June/July 2015, Members of Goodasyou organized free hugs and missed call campaigns

== Support ==
Good As You provides mental health, legal and moral support. The space has also ground for creations of many other groups including Queer Campus and Queer Reads Bangalore.

Counselling is provided for LGBT people and other sexual minorities as well as HIV infected people.

== See also ==
- LGBT culture in Bangalore
