= Sangama (human rights group) =

LGBT rights group in India

Sangama is a LGBTQ rights group based in Bungaluru, India. When it began in 1999, Sangama acted as a documentation center but it has since grown to become an LGBTQ rights and HIV prevention NGO that mobilizes against sexual harassment and discrimination and conducts HIV prevention seminars and programmes. The organization works with non-English speaking, working class sex workers and LGBT people and people living with HIV (PLHIV) in Karnataka and Kerala.

== History ==
Sangama was founded in 1999 by Manohar Elavarthi as a center that provided counseling services to sexual minorities and research materials to scholars of LGBT issues in the Bangalore region. Other members in the first board included Arunesh Maiyer, Shubha Chacko and Arvind Narrain. Maiyer is the current president of the board from 2016. The organization hosted discussions that attracted social activists and English speaking LGBT individuals. Over the years, the organization expanded its scope from providing counseling services, to providing HIV/AIDS information, supporting the rights of transgender people through rallies and mobilization and acting as safe drop-in for LGBT individuals in Karnataka. The organization's human rights focus has encouraged its attention to focus on non-English speaking Kothis and Hijra's from underprivileged communities in India who are at risk of HIV and abuse.

== Activities ==
=== Liaison with community groups ===
Sangama works with a few organizations in an HIV prevention project called Lasyakairali Pehchan. The project provides support to community based organizations on strategies to prevent HIV/AIDS in their respective LGBT communities. Samara a community based organization that implements HIV/AIDS prevention programs in the Bangalore Urban District is an outgrowth of Sangama.

=== Outreach ===
Sangama established two outreach projects, one to reach gay individuals and the other to reach out to transgender people. Fieldworkers go to cruising joints to listen to problems faced by individuals and sex workers on the streets of Bangalore. The outreach programs helped Sangama gain more members for its drop-in sessions.

In conjunction with the Karnataka Sex Workers Union and Pedestrian Films, Sangama released a feature-length movie, Let the butterflies fly, in 2012. The movie was rejected at the Bangalore Film Festival but won an award at the Kashish Mumbai Festival.

=== Legal services ===
Sangama provides legal aid to sexual minorities who are abused and harassed by the police or charged with crimes due to their sexual orientation. Apart from legal services, the group also tracks police harassment and detention of LGBT individuals in Karnataka. In 2008, while going to a police station to support 5 hijras who were arrested, Sangama representatives were sent to another station where they were beaten. The organization continues to speak out about sexual discrimination and rights for transgender people in India.

=== Corona relief ===
With a donation of Rs.1.5 lakh from Arundhati Roy, Sangama collected about Rs.10 lakh to provide relief of Rs.2000 each to sex workers and trans persons in the districts of Bangalore Rural, Hasan, Bidar, Yadgir, Ramanagara, Haveri, Gadag, Raichur, Koppala, Kolar, Chikmagalur and Uttar Kannada. Two sex worker collectives Karnataka Sex Workers Union (KSWU) and Uttar Karnataka Mahila Ookutta (UKMO) helped with the distribution.

=== Reservation for Transgender in Karnataka ===
Following the advocacy efforts of Sangama, the Karnataka government amended recruitment rules in May 2021 to grant one per cent reservation to transgender persons in merit category, scheduled caste, scheduled tribe and backward classes categories. Sangama and its programme officer Nisha Gulur approached High Court and the government revealed 13 May 2021 notification to the court.
