= Halakki Vokkaliga =

Indigenous tribe of Karnataka, India

The Halakki-Vokkalu (Kannada: ಹಾಲಕ್ಕಿ ಸಮುದಾಯ, also transliterated as Halwakki-Wakkal and Halakki-Vokkaliga) are an indigenous tribe of Karnataka, India. They are found predominantly in Uttara Kannada district and are distinct from Vokkaligas.

Halakki Vokkaligas living in the foot of Western Ghats are known as the "Aboriginals of Uttara Kannada". Their way of living is still ancient. The women adorn themselves with beads and necklaces, heavy nose rings and distinctive attire. Halakki speak a specific dialect of Kannada called Achchagannada.

== Reservation ==
The Halakkis are currently classified as Other Backward Class (OBC). Taking Halakkis cognisance of the tribe’s demands to be recognised as a Scheduled Tribe, a study was commissioned by the social welfare department and a report was submitted.

== Notable Halakkis ==
- Sukri Bommagowda was a notable Halakki Vokkaliga that won the Padma Shri for folk singing, she is fondly known as "Nightingale of Halakis".
- Vaidya Hanumanath Bommu Gouda is also a notable Halakki Vokkaliga and he holds many respected posts such as member of the Department of Folk Science in Hampi Kannada University, member of Western Ghats Forest Products, member of the J.C. club and a few others. Observing his humble service in the medical field and social service he was honoured with fellowship in New-Delhi in 2005, Vaidya Ratna award in 2005, Karnataka's most respected award Kannada Rajyostava Award in 2014.
- Tulsi Gowda is an environmentalist from Ankola taluk who was honoured with the Padma Shri award in 2020.
