= Bengaluru Town Hall =

Bangalore Town Hall
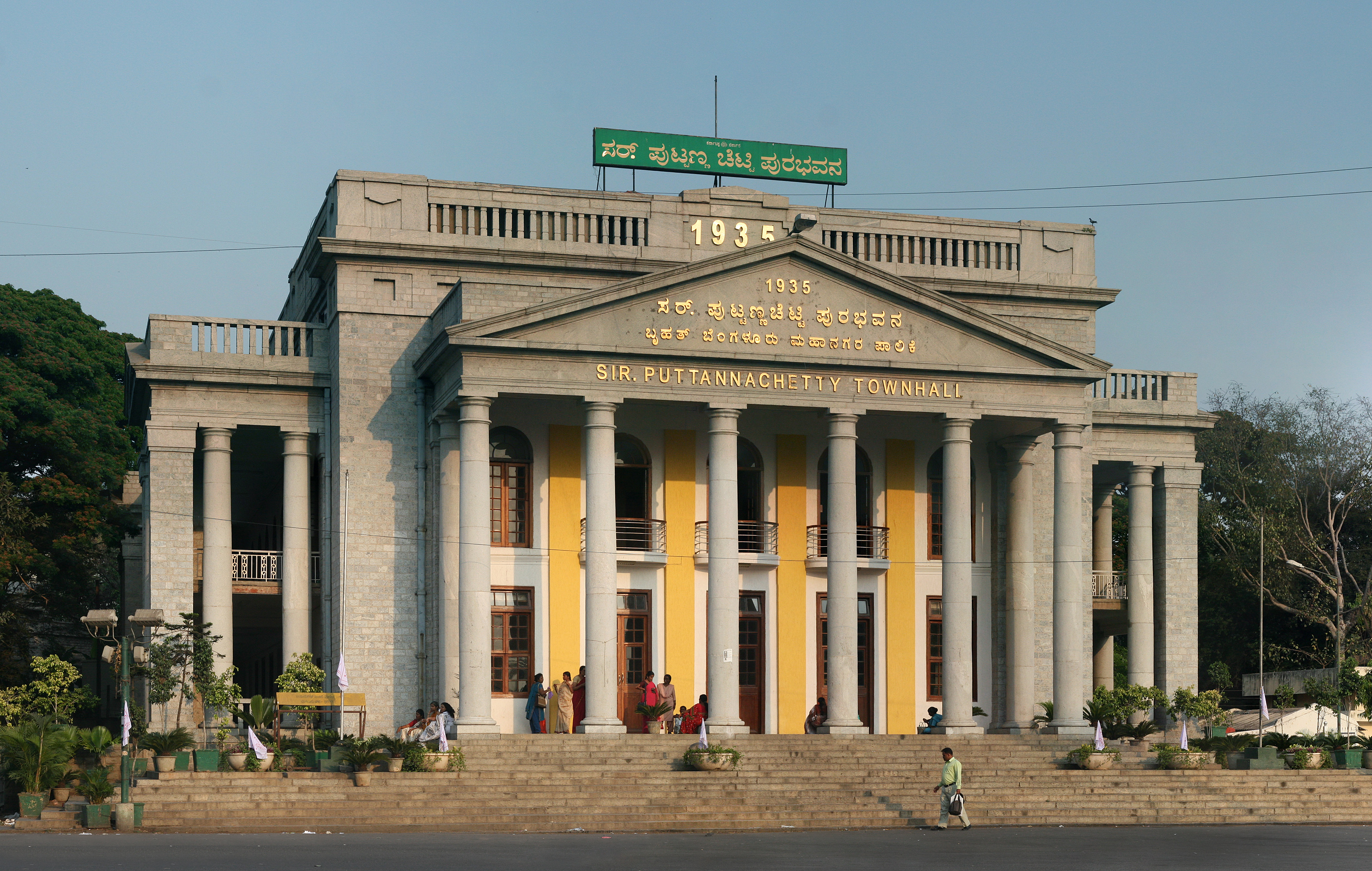
- The Town Hall, in 2010
- Interactive map of the Bangalore Town Hall area
- Alternative names: Sir Puttanna Chetty Town Hall

General information
- Type: Town hall
- Architectural style: Neoclassical architecture
- Location: Bangalore Urban; Karnataka; India, 112 J C Road, Bangalore; Karnataka
- Coordinates: 12.9581°N 77.5833°E
- Construction started: 6 March 1933
- Completed: 11 September 1935
- Renovated: March 1990
- Cost: Rs 175,000 (Unadjusted for inflation)
- Owner: Bruhat Bengaluru Mahanagara Palike

Technical details
- Floor count: 2

Design and construction
- Architect: Sri S. Lakshminarasappa
- Civil engineer: Sir Mirza Ismail
- Main contractor: Sri Chikkananjundappa

Sir K. P. Puttanna Chetty Town Hall, locally commonly referred to as Bangalore Town Hall, is a neoclassical municipal building in Bangalore, India, named after the philanthropist and former president of Bangalore City Municipality, Sir K.P Puttanna Chetty.

== History ==
The building was commissioned and inaugurated by Yuvaraja Kanteerava Narasimharaja Wadiyar and designed by Sir Mirza Ismail. Foundation stone for the building was laid by Maharaja Krishnaraja Wadiyar IV on 6 March 1933. The building was completed on 11 September 1935.

The structure features a flight of steps leading to the entrance porch resting on Tuscan columns with identical columns extending on either sides.

Due to improper acoustics, a renovation was proposed estimated at Rs 1,000,000 in 1976. Postponements delayed renovations till March 1990, when the building was finally closed for renovation. The cost then was Rs 6.5 million (approximately US$371,400).

The auditorium has two floors with a previous total capacity of 1,038 seats. The seating capacity has been reduced to 810 following the renovations.
